= Centre Island =

Centre Island or Center Island may refer to:

== Antarctica ==
- Centre Island (Antarctica)

== Asia ==
- Centre Island, Hong Kong

== North America ==
- Centre Island, Toronto, Canada
  - Centre Island Docks
- Centre Island (Nunavut), Canada
- Centre Island, New York, a village in Nassau County, New York, U.S.
- Center Island (New York), an island in Green Island village, Albany County, New York, U.S.
- Center Island (Washington), U.S.
  - Center Island Airport

== Oceania ==
- Centre Island (Australia), Sir Edward Pellew Group of Islands, Australia
- Centre Island, New Zealand
- Centre Island (Te Anau), New Zealand

== South America ==
- Centre Island, Falkland Islands

== See also ==
- Central Island, Kenya
