= List of airports in Washington =

Washington, a state in the Pacific Northwest region of the United States, has 132 public use airports that are used for general aviation, commercial flights, and other purposes. The state also has several military airports and private airfields. Public airports owned by municipal corporations, including public port districts, were authorized by the Washington State Legislature in 1941.

This list contains all public-use and military airports in the state, grouped by type and sorted by location. Some private-use and former airports may be included where notable, such as airports that were previously public-use, those with commercial enplanements recorded by the FAA or airports assigned an IATA airport code.

== Airports ==
This list contains the following information:

- **City served** – The city generally associated with the airport, as per the airport's master record with the Federal Aviation Administration. This is not always the actual location since some airports are located in smaller towns outside of the city they serve. It is not meant to be a complete list of cities served, which can be found in or added to each airport's Wikipedia article.
- **FAA** – The location identifier assigned by the Federal Aviation Administration (FAA). These are linked to each airport's page at the Washington State Department of Transportation.
- **IATA** – The airport code assigned by the International Air Transport Association (IATA). Those that do not match the FAA code are shown in bold.
- **ICAO** – The location indicator assigned by the International Civil Aviation Organization (ICAO).
- **Airport name** – The official airport name. Those shown in **bold** indicate the airport has scheduled passenger service on commercial airlines.
- **Role** – One of four FAA airport categories, as per the 2017–2021 National Plan of Integrated Airport Systems (NPIAS) report released September 2016:
  - P-s: Commercial service – primary are publicly owned airports that receive scheduled passenger service and have more than 10,000 passenger boardings (enplanements) each year. Each primary airport is sub-classified by the FAA as one of the following four "hub" types (s):
    - L: Large hub that accounts for at least 1% of total U.S. passenger enplanements.
    - M: Medium hub that accounts for between 0.25% and 1% of total U.S. passenger enplanements.
    - S: Small hub that accounts for between 0.05% and 0.25% of total U.S. passenger enplanements.
    - N: Nonhub that accounts for less than 0.05% of total U.S. passenger enplanements, but more than 10,000 annual enplanements.
  - CS: Commercial service – nonprimary are publicly owned airports that receive scheduled passenger service and have at least 2,500 passenger boardings each year.
  - R: Reliever airports are designated by the FAA to relieve congestion at a large commercial service airport and to provide more general aviation access to the overall community.
  - GA: General aviation airports are the largest single group of airports in the U.S. airport system. They are public-use airports that do not have scheduled service or have scheduled service with less than 2,500 passenger boardings each year.
- **Enplanements** – The number of enplanements (commercial passenger boardings) that occurred at the airport in calendar year 2023, as per FAA records released November 2021.

City served	FAA	IATA	ICAO	Airport name	Role	Enplanements (2024)
				**Commercial service – primary airports**		
Bellingham	BLI	BLI	KBLI	**Bellingham International Airport**	P-N	266,703
Eastsound	ORS	**ESD**	KORS	**Orcas Island Airport**	P-N	9,512
Everett	PAE	PAE	KPAE	**Paine Field** (Snohomish County Airport)	P-N	275,996
Friday Harbor	FHR	**FRD**	KFHR	**Friday Harbor Airport**	P-N	12,898
Pasco	PSC	PSC	KPSC	**Tri-Cities Airport**	P-S	476,639
Pullman / Moscow, Idaho	PUW	PUW	KPUW	**Pullman–Moscow Regional Airport**	P-N	64,580
Seattle	BFI	BFI	KBFI	**King County International Airport** (Boeing Field)	P-N	28,769
Seattle / Tacoma (SeaTac)	SEA	SEA	KSEA	**Seattle–Tacoma International Airport**	P-L	25,414,592
Spokane	GEG	GEG	KGEG	**Spokane International Airport** (Geiger Field)	P-S	2,064,412
Walla Walla	ALW	ALW	KALW	**Walla Walla Regional Airport**	P-N	36,873
Wenatchee	EAT	EAT	KEAT	**Pangborn Memorial Airport**	P-N	44,459
Yakima	YKM	YKM	KYKM	**Yakima Air Terminal** (McAllister Field)	P-N	41,471
				**Commercial service – nonprimary airports**		
Friday Harbor	W33			**Friday Harbor Seaplane Base**	CS	6,167
				**Reliever airports**		
Auburn	S50			Auburn Municipal Airport	R	0
Renton	RNT	RNT	KRNT	Renton Municipal Airport	R	1,968
Snohomish	S43			Harvey Airfield (Harvey Field)	R	4
Spokane	SFF	SFF	KSFF	Felts Field	R	39
				**General aviation airports**		
Anacortes	74S	OTS		**Anacortes Airport**	GA	58
Arlington	AWO		KAWO	Arlington Municipal Airport	GA	9
Bremerton	PWT	PWT	KPWT	Bremerton National Airport	GA	10
Brewster	S97			Anderson Field	GA	2
Burlington / Mount Vernon	BVS	MVW	KBVS	Skagit Regional Airport	GA	28
Camas / Washougal	1W1			Grove Field	GA	0
Cashmere	8S2			Cashmere–Dryden Airport	GA	0
Chehalis	CLS	CLS	KCLS	Chehalis–Centralia Airport	GA	0
Chelan	S10			Lake Chelan Airport (was Chelan Municipal Airport)	GA	1
Cle Elum	S93			Cle Elum Municipal Airport	GA	0
Colfax	S94			Port of Whitman Business Air Center (was Whitman Co. Memorial)	GA	0
Colville	63S			Colville Municipal Airport	GA	0
Dallesport	DLS	DLS	KDLS	Columbia Gorge Regional Airport	GA	0
Davenport	68S			Davenport Airport (Davenport Municipal Airport)	GA	0
Deer Park	DEW		KDEW	Deer Park Airport (was Deer Park Municipal Airport)	GA	5
Electric City	3W7			Grand Coulee Dam Airport	GA	0
Ellensburg	ELN	ELN	KELN	Bowers Field	GA	0
Ephrata	EPH	EPH	KEPH	Ephrata Municipal Airport	GA	0
Hoquiam	HQM	HQM	KHQM	Bowerman Airport (was Bowerman Field)	GA	0
Ione	S23			Ione Municipal Airport	GA	0
Kelso	KLS	KLS	KKLS	Southwest Washington Regional Airport (was Kelso–Longview)	GA	0
Kenmore (Lake Washington)	S60	KEH		**Kenmore Air Harbor** (Lake Washington)	GA	8,200
Langley	W10			Whidbey Air Park (Whidbey Airpark)	GA	0
Lopez Island	S31			**Lopez Island Airport**	GA	1,966
Moses Lake	MWH	MWH	KMWH	Grant County International Airport	GA	334
Ocean Shores	W04			Ocean Shores Municipal Airport	GA	0
Odessa	43D			Odessa Municipal Airport	GA	0
Olympia / Tumwater	OLM	OLM	KOLM	Olympia Regional Airport (was Olympia Airport)	GA	9
Omak	OMK	OMK	KOMK	Omak Airport (was Omak Municipal Airport)	GA	0
Oroville	0S7			Dorothy Scott Airport	GA	0
Othello	S70			Othello Municipal Airport	GA	0
Packwood	55S			Packwood Airport	GA	0
Port Angeles	CLM	CLM	KCLM	William R. Fairchild International Airport	GA	408
Port Townsend	0S9	TWD		Jefferson County International Airport	GA	22
Prosser	S40			Prosser Airport	GA	0
Puyallup	PLU		KPLU	Pierce County Airport (Thun Field)	GA	0
Quillayute / Forks	UIL	UIL	KUIL	Quillayute Airport (was Quillayute State Airport)	GA	4
Richland	RLD	RLD	KRLD	Richland Airport	GA	0
Ritzville	33S			Pru Field	GA	0
Rosalia	72S			Rosalia Municipal Airport	GA	0
Shelton	SHN	SHN	KSHN	Sanderson Field	GA	0
Sunnyside	1S5			Sunnyside Municipal Airport	GA	0
Tacoma	TIW	TIW	KTIW	Tacoma Narrows Airport	GA	71
Toledo / Winlock	TDO	TDO	KTDO	South Lewis County Airport (Ed Carlson Memorial Field)	GA	0
Vancouver	VUO		KVUO	Pearson Field	GA	19
Vashon	2S1			Vashon Municipal Airport	GA	0
Wilbur	2S8			Wilbur Airport (Wilbur Municipal Airport)	GA	0
Winthrop	S52			Methow Valley State Airport	GA	6
				**Other public-use airports** (not listed in NPIAS)		
Anacortes	21H			Skyline Seaplane Base		
Anatone	D69			Rogersburg Airport (was Rogersburg State Airport)		
Bandera / North Bend	4W0			Bandera State Airport		
Battle Ground	W52			Goheen Airport (was Goheen Field)		
Battle Ground	W58			Cedars North Airpark		
Bellingham	0W7			Floathaven Seaplane Base		
Chewelah	1S9			Sand Canyon Airport		
Clayton	C72			Cross Winds Airport		
Cle Elum	2W1			De Vere Field		
Colfax	00W			Lower Granite State Airport		
College Place	S95			Martin Field		
Camano Island / Stanwood	13W			Camano Island Airfield		
Concrete	3W5			Mears Field (was Concrete Municipal Airport)		
Copalis Beach	S16			Copalis State Airport (was Copalis Beach State Airport)		
Darrington	1S2			Darrington Municipal Airport		
Easton	ESW	ESW	KESW	Easton State Airport		
Eatonville	2W3			Swanson Airport (was Swanson Field)		
Elma	4W8			Elma Municipal Airport		
Forks	S18			Forks Airport (was Forks Municipal Airport)		6
Goldendale	S20			Goldendale Airport (was Goldendale Municipal Airport)		
Greenwater	21W			Ranger Creek Airport (was Ranger Creek State Airport)		
Ilwaco	7W1			Port of Ilwaco Airport (was Ilwaco Airport)		
Kahlotus	W09			Lower Monumental State Airport		
Kennewick	S98			Vista Field		
Kent	S36			Crest Airpark		
Laurier	69S			Avey Field State Airport (Avey Field)		
Leavenworth	27W			Lake Wenatchee State Airport		
Lester	15S			Lester State Ultralight Flightpark		
Lind	0S0			Lind Airport (was Lind Municipal Airport)		
Lynden	38W			Lynden Airport (was Lynden Municipal Airport)		
Mansfield	8W3			Mansfield Airport		
Mattawa	M94			Desert Aire Airport		
Mazama	W12			Lost River Resort Airport		
Mead	70S			Mead Flying Service Airport		
Metaline Falls	09S			Sullivan Lake State Airport		
Monroe	W16			Firstair Field		
Morton	39P			Strom Field		
Moses Lake	W20			Moses Lake Municipal Airport		
Oak Harbor	OKH	ODW	KOKH	A.J. Eisenberg Airport (was Wes Lupien Airport)		1
Okanogan	S35			Okanogan Legion Airport		
Olympia	44T			Hoskins Field		
Point Roberts	1RL			**Point Roberts Airpark**		
Poulsbo	83Q	PUL	KPUL	Port of Poulsbo Marina Moorage Seaplane Base		3
Quincy	80T			Quincy Municipal Airport		
Renton	W36			Will Rogers Wiley Post Seaplane Base		
Republic	R49			Ferry County Airport		
Rimrock	4S6			Tieton State Airport		
Roche Harbor	W39			**Roche Harbor Seaplane Base**		4,699
Rochester	8W9			R & K Skyranch Airport		
Rosario / Eastsound	W49	RSJ		**Rosario Seaplane Base**		1,419
Seattle (Lake Union)	W55	LKE		**Kenmore Air Harbor Seaplane Base** (Lake Union)		
Seattle	0W0			Seattle Seaplanes Seaplane Base		
Sekiu	11S			Sekiu Airport		25
Sequim	W28	SQV		Sequim Valley Airport		34
Silverdale	8W5			Apex Airpark		
Skykomish	S88			Skykomish State Airport		
South Bend / Raymond	2S9			Willapa Harbor Airport		
Spanaway	3B8			Shady Acres Airport		
Spanaway	S44			Spanaway Airport (Spanaway Airpark)		
Starbuck	16W			Little Goose Lock and Dam Airport (was Little Goose State Airport)		
Stehekin	6S9			Stehekin State Airport		0
Sultan	S86			Sky Harbor Airport		
Tacoma	W37			American Lake Seaplane Base		
Tekoa	73S			Willard Field		
Tonasket	W01			Tonasket Municipal Airport		
Twisp	2S0			Twisp Municipal Airport		1
Vancouver	W56			Fly For Fun Airport		
Walla Walla	9W2			Page Airport		
Warden	2S4			Warden Airport (New Warden Airport)		
Waterville	2S5			Waterville Airport		
Westport	14S			Westport Airport		0
Wilson Creek	5W1			Wilson Creek Airport		
Woodland	W27			Woodland State Airport		
				**Other military airports**		
Coupeville	NRA		KNRA	NOLF Coupeville		
Oak Harbor	NUW	NUW	KNUW	NAS Whidbey Island (Ault Field)		700
Port Angeles	NOW		KNOW	Coast Guard Air Station Port Angeles		
Spokane	SKA	SKA	KSKA	Fairchild Air Force Base		405
Tacoma	TCM	TCM	KTCM	McChord Field (Joint Base Lewis–McChord) (was McChord Air Force Base)		10,301
Tacoma	GRF	GRF	KGRF	Gray Army Airfield (Fort Lewis)		238
Yakima	FCT	FCT	KFCT	Vagabond Army Airfield (Yakima Training Center)		
Yakima				Selah Airstrip (Yakima Training Center)		
				**Notable private-use airports**		
Blakely Island	38WA	BYW		Blakely Island Airport		6
Center Island	78WA	CWS		Center Island Airport		1
Chelan	WA13			Seaplane Landing Area		
Decatur Island	WN07			Decatur Shores Airport		
Decatur Island	WA18			Decatur (Jones) Airport		0
Lopez Island	S31	LPS		**Fishermans Bay/LPS Seaplane Base**		
Marysville	WN53			Frontier Airpark		
Omak	0WN9			Wings for Christ Airport		
Port Orchard	4WA9			Port Orchard Airport		
Roche Harbor	WA09	RCE		**Roche Harbor Airport** (formerly public-use, FAA: 9S1)		8
Seattle	WN22			Lake Union Heliport		27,333
Sequim	2WA1			Diamond Point Airstrip		1
Stuart Island	7WA5	SSW		Stuart Island Airpark		
Trout Lake	66WA			Trout Lake Airport		
Westsound	WA83	WSX		**Westsound/WSX Seaplane Base**		1,014
Yelm	06WN			Western Airpark (formerly public-use, FAA: 92W)		
				**Notable former airports**		
Almira	~~1W0~~			J-Z Airport (closed 2008?)		
Bellevue	~~BVU~~			Bellevue Airfield (closed 1983)		
Blaine	~~4W6~~	~~BWS~~		Blaine Municipal Airport (closed 2008)		
Martha Lake	~~S13~~			Martha Lake Airport (closed 2000)		
Vancouver	~~59S~~			Evergreen Field (closed 2006)		

== See also ==
- Essential Air Service
- Washington World War II Army Airfields
