= Quincy Airport =

Quincy Airport may refer to:

- Quincy Regional Airport in Quincy, Illinois, United States (FAA: UIN)
- Quincy Municipal Airport (Florida) in Quincy, Florida, United States (FAA: 2J9)
- Quincy Municipal Airport (Washington) in Quincy, Washington, United States (FAA: 80T)
- Gansner Field in Quincy, California, United States (FAA: 2O1)

== See also ==
- Quincy Municipal Airport (disambiguation)
