= Lynk =

Lynk or LYNK may refer to:

- Lynk (band), an Australian pop rock band
- Lynk Air, an American airline
- Lynk & Co, an automotive brand owned by China-based Zhejiang Geely Holding Group
- Lynk Cup, an annual Jamaican football competition
- Lynk Global, a US company developing a global satellite mobile phone service
- Kapino Polje Airport (ICAO: LYNK), a sport airport located near Nikšić, Montenegro

== Surname ==
- Beebe Steven Lynk (1872–1948), American chemist
- Beth Lynk, Assistant Secretary of Housing and Urban Development
- Michael Lynk (born 1952), Canadian legal academic
- Miles Vandahurst Lynk (1871–1956), American physician and author
- Roy Lynk (born 1932), British trade union president
