= Lynk Air =

American airline

IATA	ICAO	Call sign
none	none	LYNK AIR
- Founded: 2018
- Focus cities: Oak Harbor (KOKH), Seattle (KSEA)
- Frequent-flyer program: Lynk Air Members
- Fleet size: 1
- Destinations: 19
- Headquarters: Oak Harbor, Washington, United States
- Key people: Chris Taylor
- Website: https://www.lynkair.com/

Lynk Air is an American airline that operates scheduled and charter passenger flights in Washington and Oregon. Based in Oak Harbor, Washington, it offers various commuter flights between Seattle–Tacoma International Airport and surrounding regional airports.

== History ==
Lynk Air was founded in 2018 in Oak Harbor by retired United States Navy pilot Chris Taylor and his wife, Helen, with the goal of shortening the three hour driving commute from Whidbey Island to Seattle to a short 20-minute flight. They also offer charter services to various destinations in Washington and Oregon, including for weddings and wine tours.

== Destinations ==
Lynk Air currently operates scheduled and charter to the following 19 destinations

- Oak Harbor, Washington (A.J. Eisenberg Airport)
- Everett, Washington (Paine Field)
- Seattle (Boeing Field)
- Brewster, Washington (Anderson Field (Washington))
- Chelan, Washington (Lake Chelan Airport)
- Prosser, Washington (Prosser Airport)
- Pullman, Washington (Pullman–Moscow Regional Airport)
- Quincy, Washington (Quincy Municipal Airport (Washington))
- Royal City, Washington (Stillwater Creek Airport)
- Walla Walla, Washington (Walla Walla Regional Airport)
- Yakima, Washington (Yakima Air Terminal)
- Bandon, Oregon (Bandon State Airport)
- Pendleton, Oregon (Eastern Oregon Regional Airport)
- Boise, Washington (Caldwell Industrial Airport)
- Richland, Washington (Richland Airport (Washington))
- Hillsboro, Oregon (Hillsboro Airport)
- Portland, Oregon (Portland International Airport)
- Roseburg, Oregon (Roseburg Regional Airport)
- Spokane, Washington (Spokane International Airport)

== Fleet ==
As of November 25, 2021, Lynk Air operates two aircraft, with plans to expand the fleet.

Lynk Air
Aircraft	Count	Variants	Notes
Piaggio P.180 Avanti	2	P.180 Avanti	7 Passengers
Embraer Phenom 100	1	E50P	5 Passengers
Daher Kodiak 100	1	100	9 Passengers

== Livery ==
Lynk Air's livery consists of a red stripe along the tail which extends onto the fuselage, with the Lynk Air logo in white printed across the tail (containing just the word "Lynk"), and a larger logo printed on the fuselage in black. The bottom of the aircraft's wings is red, with the white arc featured in the Lynk Air logo stretch the length of both wings. It was designed by graphic designer Kaden Chang of Vancouver, Canada.
