= Waterville =

Waterville may refer to:

== Places ==
=== Canada ===
- Waterville, Quebec
- Waterville, Nova Scotia
- Waterville, Carleton County, New Brunswick, a rural community
- Waterville, Sunbury County, New Brunswick, a rural community
- Waterville, Newfoundland and Labrador

=== Ireland ===
- Waterville, County Kerry, a seaside village
- Waterville, Dublin, a housing development near Dublin city

=== United States ===
- Waterville (Waterbury), a neighborhood of Waterbury, Connecticut
- Waterville, Iowa
- Waterville, Kansas
- Waterville, Maine
- Waterville, Minnesota
- Waterville, New York
- Waterville, Ohio
- Waterville, Pennsylvania
- Waterville, Tennessee
- Waterville, Texas
- Waterville, Vermont
- Waterville, Washington
- Waterville, Wisconsin
- Waterville, Waukesha County, Wisconsin, in the village of Summit
- Waterville Valley, New Hampshire
- Waterville USA, a water and amusement park in Alabama

== Sports ==
- Waterville (baseball), a minor league baseball team based in Waterville, Maine
- Waterville GAA, a Gaelic football club based in Waterville, County Kerry, Ireland

== See also ==
- Waterville Airport (disambiguation)
- Waterville Township (disambiguation)
