= José Antonio Price =

Afro-Panamanian physician and politician

José Antonio Price (1890–1951) was a prominent Afro-Panamanian physician and Liberal politician who graduated from University of West Tennessee College of Medicine and Surgery in 1913. Price is regarded as the first black Panamanian to hold a medical degree in republican Panama.

== Early life ==
José Antonio Price was born in Santa Ana, Panama City, then part of the Republic of Colombia in 1890 and was the only son of Hilda Price, an immigrant from British Honduras. He moved very early on in his life to the western part of the Isthmus, to the Caribbean location of Bocas del Toro where he spent the majority of his life and career. At the beginning of the 20th century, Bocas del Toro was a prominent international port, home to the first international headquarters of the United Fruit Company.

== Education ==
Price attended high school in Kingston, Jamaica before traveling to the southern United States, where he became an alumnus of two Historically black colleges and universities, Shaw University at Raleigh, North Carolina where he attended special courses from 1907 to 1909 and University of West Tennessee College of Medicine and Surgery in Memphis, where he obtained his medical degree in 1913 under the guidance of professor Miles Vandahurst Lynk.

Price spoke Spanish, English and French fluently.

== Professional career ==
Price became a pioneer of private medicine in the Republic of Panama. Upon his return to Bocas del Toro in 1913, he started a private practice in his own medical facility called ´Hospital Santa Fe´, located at Four Street and Central Avenue. He also established a drugstore “Farmacia Central” which was the largest in town. These health facilities were instrumental in coping with the large demand of medical services as the population approached 23,000.

In the early nineteen twenties president Belisario Porras started a nationalization campaign of Panama's public health which had largely been in the hands of the Americans since 1904. During this period Price served as Official Doctor of the indigenous region of Chiriquí Occidente and Official Doctor of the province of Darien. Price also held multiple government appointments in Bocas del Toro such as Sanitary Doctor and Forensic Doctor. There is evidence that Price also provided free medical services to the poor over a career that spanned for almost forty years.

== Political career ==
Price was a Liberal radical and a close political ally to Carlos Antonio Mendoza, Belisario Porras, Francisco Arias Paredes and Ernesto de la Guardia. He served as an elected member of the Municipal Council of Bocas del Toro, representing different factions of the Liberal party such as Partido Liberal, Partido Liberal Renovador and Partido Liberal Unido.

== Personal life ==
Price married Liliane Maud Georget Smith, who was of French descent, in 1915. She was a daughter of Louis Victor Georget, former Superintendent of the United Fruit Co., who died in 1908. He remarried in 1941 to Maria America Vernaza Boyes, a Granddaughter of General Heliodoro Vernaza. Together they had three children Juan Antonio, Jose Antonio and Desiree Antonia. Price died of cancer on Colón Island, Bocas del Toro in 1951.
