= Glacial erratic boulders of Snohomish County, Washington =

Glacial erratic boulders of Snohomish County are large glacial erratic boulders of rock which were moved to Snohomish County, Washington by glacial action during previous ice ages.

== List of boulders ==
Airport Boulder, at Martha Lake Airport Park in Martha Lake, said to be "one of the largest glacial erratic boulders in urban King, Snohomish, and Pierce counties", is approximately 20 feet (6.1 m) long on its longest axis and about twice a man's height. The erratic is composed of greenstone, and has long been used for bouldering (rock climbing), with at least four ascent routes. 47°51′53.7″N 122°14′10.7″W
Edmonds Way erratic Fraser Valley breccia, 10 by 15 feet (3.0 m × 4.6 m) and 12 feet (3.7 m) high. 47.7892°N 122.3548°W
Everett Boulder, erratic found 30 feet (9.1 m) underground at downtown construction site, Colby Avenue and Wall Street. 18 feet (5.5 m) long, and 10 feet (3.0 m) high, weighs approximately 300,000 pounds (140,000 kg). The erratic briefly had over one hundred Twitter followers and was eventually reburied. 47.9779°N 122.2086°W
"Granite" is a 6-by-7-by-4.5-foot (1.8 m × 2.1 m × 1.4 m), 30,000-pound (14,000 kg) granite boulder discovered "under a bunch of sticker bushes" during an October, 2015 construction project in Edmonds. After attempts to destroy the boulder resulted in destruction of the power equipment used, the city offered it for free to a city resident who would accept it on their property. 47.7995°N 122.3412°W
Lake Stevens Monster near Lake Stevens. 34 by 78 feet (10 m × 24 m) and 210 feet (64 m) in circumference. Largest known erratic in Washington State as of 2011, and may be largest in the United States (but not North America; see the Alberta Big Rock). 47°59.816′N 122°6.954′W
2 U.S. Route 2 Boulders in Gold Bar, Washington. Visible from U.S. Route 2, there are 2 large glacial erratic boulders in the Big Bend clear cut on the west side of the road, which is east of the Heidelberg Materials facility. One boulder is adjacent to the road and is approximately 30-40 feet tall, and one is further southwest from the road up the embankment. 47°50′1.66″N 121°37′5.83″W
Longview Boulder found in a Gold Bar gravel mine; five times the height of a man. Blasted and removed. 47°50′N 121°38′W
Unnamed erratics near Market Place road in Lake Stevens. Largest is unusual pink granite, approximately 12 by 20 feet (3.7 m × 6.1 m) in size, and 10 feet (3.0 m) tall. 47°59′50.5″N 122°05′55.52″W

== See also ==
- List of individual rocks
