= Easton Airport (disambiguation) =

Easton Airport may refer to:

- Easton Airport (Maryland), or Newnam Field, in Easton, Maryland, United States (FAA: ESN)
- Easton State Airport in Easton, Washington, United States (FAA: ESW)
- Easton/Valley View Airport in Greeley, Colorado, United States (FAA: 11V)

Other airports serving places named Easton

- Braden Airpark in Easton, Pennsylvania, United States (FAA: N43)
- Lehigh Valley International Airport serving Allentown, Bethlehem and Easton, in Pennsylvania, United States (FAA: ABE)
