= SZW (disambiguation) =

SZW is the Ministry of Social Affairs and Employment (Dutch: Ministerie van Sociale Zaken en Werkgelegenheid) in the Netherlands.

SZW or szw may also refer to:

- Parchim International Airport, Germany, IATA code SZW
- Quincy Municipal Airport (Florida), United States, FAA location identifier SZW
- Sawai language, spoken in Indonesia, ISO 639-3 language code: szw
- Zweibrücken Hauptbahnhof, railway station in Zweibrücken, Germany, station code SZW
