= KRLD =

KRLD may refer to:

- KRLD (AM), a radio station (1080 AM) licensed to Dallas, Texas, United States
- KRLD-FM, a radio station (105.3 FM) licensed to Dallas, Texas, United States
- KZPS, a radio station (92.5 FM) licensed to Dallas, Texas, United States; formerly KRLD-FM from 1948 to 1972
- KRLD-TV, the former call sign of KDFW from 1949 to 1970
- KRLD-TV, the former call sign of KDAF from 1984 to 1986
- Richland Airport (Washington) (ICAO code KRLD)
