= Martha Lake Airport Park =

Park in Washington, United States

- Location within Washington (state)
- Type: County park
- Location: Martha Lake, Washington
- Coordinates: 47°51′47.06″N 122°14′16.48″W
- Area: 28.76 acres (11.64 ha)
- Created: 2010
- Operator: Snohomish County Parks and Recreation
- Status: Open all year

Martha Lake Airport Park is a county park located in Martha Lake, Snohomish County, Washington. It was originally a private-use airport known as the Martha Lake Airport that was closed in the late 1990s and sold to the county in 2000. The 28.76-acre (11.64 ha) park was opened in 2010 and features athletic fields for soccer and softball and a skate park. A large glacial erratic on the property, one of several in the county, is used for bouldering (rock climbing).

== History ==
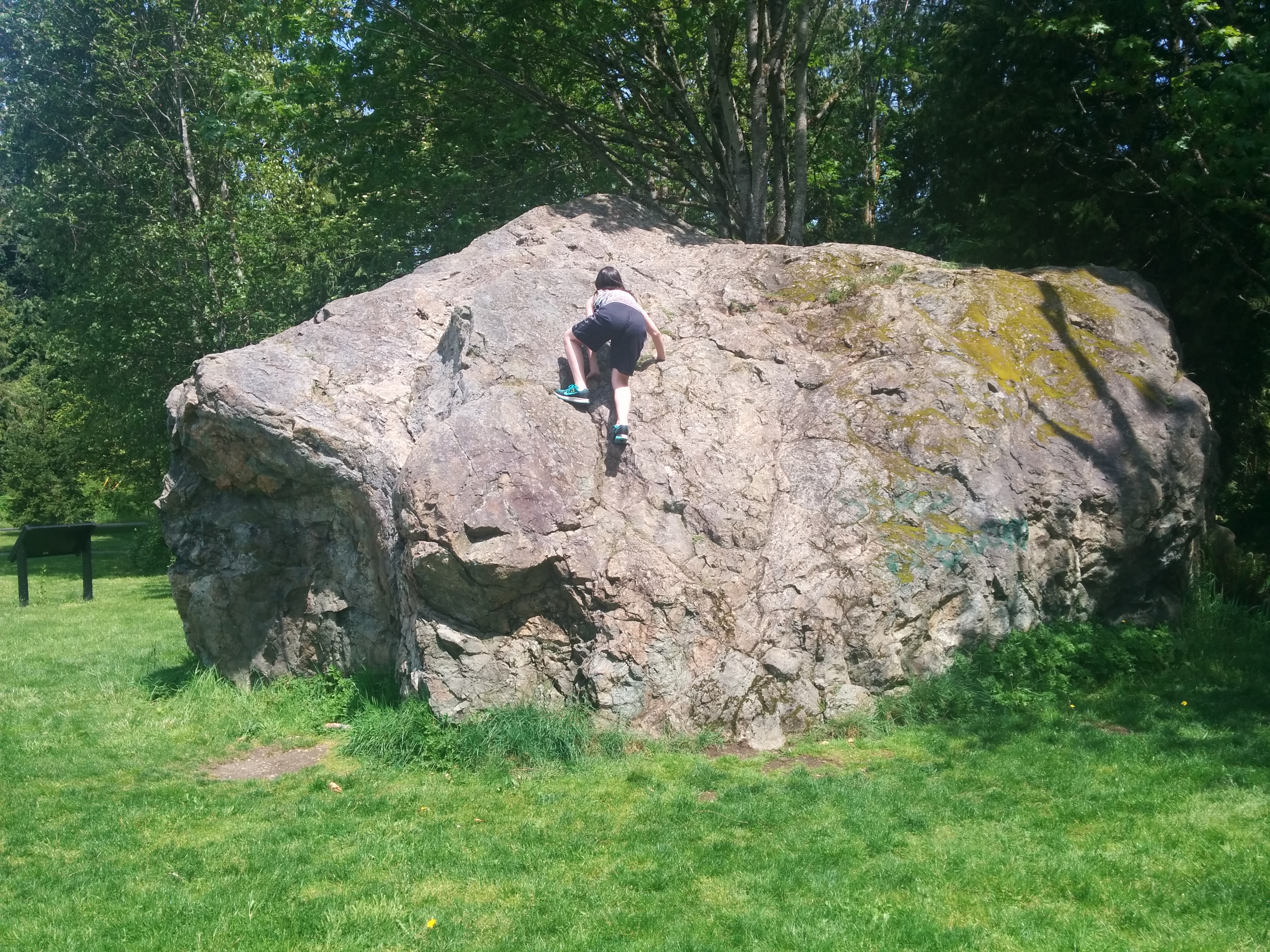
A glacial erratic at Martha Lake Airport Park, used for bouldering

=== Use as private airport ===
The Martha Lake Airport was a private airport operated by Ed Hauter, Sr. and his family on their farm that they purchased in 1955. The airport, which had been encroached by suburban development from the 1960s onwards, was closed in 1998 after the death of Dorothy Hauter.

=== Conversion into park ===
Snohomish County purchased the property from the Hauter family for $3.6 million in 2000, who had declined offers from real estate developers. Plans for the park were drawn up in 2004 and approved by the county in June 2008, allowing for construction to begin in February 2009. The park was dedicated and opened on October 9, 2010 by county officials.

== See also ==
- List of airports in Washington (state)
- Glacial erratic boulders in Snohomish County, Washington
