= Shady Acres Airport =

Public-use airpark in Spanaway, Washington

Coordinates: 47°04′13″N 122°22′15″W

Shady Acres Airport (FAA LID: 3B8) is a privately owned, public-use airport located 3 miles southeast of Spanaway, Washington. The airport is an airpark, and it features homes with aircraft hangars parked at the airport.

The airport is located hear the Seattle Class B airspace as well as the Class D airspace for Joint Base Lewis McChord as well as Fort Lewis Army Base.

== History ==
The idea for the community was launched in the late 1950s by a group who met at the Pierce County Airport (Thun Field). The airport was officially established in 1962 as one of the first airpark communities in Washington State. The airport originally sat on 40 acre parcels divided into 2.5 acre parcels for pilots to build homes and hangars.

The airport has been controversial for advocating for the closure of Meyers Road, south of the airport. Airport owners have argued that, in order to extend the runway, it's easier to close the road than to tunnel the road underneath a longer runway.

== Facilities and aircraft ==
The airport has one runway designated as 16/34. It measures 1800 x 20 ft (549 x 6 m) and is paved with asphalt.

For the 12-month period ending December 31, 2019, the airport had 42 aircraft operations per week, or 504 per year. It was entirely general aviation. For the same time period, there are 21 aircraft based on the field, all single-engine airplanes.

There was a fire at the airport in September 2022 that damaged 2 hangars. At least one aircraft was in the hangars at the time of the fire, and the hangar was a complete loss.

== Accidents and incidents ==
- On February 18, 1996, a Piper PA-23 Apache sustained substantial damage during a runway overrun at Shady Acres. The pilot reported the aircraft failed to slow down after application of wheel brakes, so the pilot left the pavement onto grass in the hopes the added drag would help the plane stop. After the pilot departed the pavement, the aircraft went over an embankment after slowing to approximately 10 MPH and collided with trees. The probable cause of the accident was found to be the failure of the pilot to use all available runway, including the overrun area, to stop the airplane. Factors relating to the accident were the wet runway, and the pilot's inability to see the overrun from the runway due to the sloping terrain.
- On October 23, 2019, a Vans RV 6 was substantially damaged during a forced landing following a loss of engine power after takeoff from Shady Acres Airport. The pilot reported that the initial taxi and run-up were normal. However, halfway throughout the initial take-off roll, the engine sputtered and the pilot aborted the takeoff. Subsequent run-up and take-off were normal. As the airplane ascended through 260 ft above ground level, the engine began to sputter and, shortly after, the engine lost all power. The pilot initiated a forced landing to an open field near the airport.
- On October 17, 2020, an aircraft on a training flight landed in a parking lot due to an engine failure immediately after takeoff from Shady Acres.

== See also ==
- List of airports in Washington
