= W58 (disambiguation) =

The W58 was an American thermonuclear warhead.

W58 may also refer to:

- Cedars North Airpark, in Clark County, Washington, United States
- Toyoshimizu Station, in Hokkaido, Japan
- W58, a Toyota W transmission
