= S88 =

S88 may refer to:

- BenQ-Siemens S88, a BenQ Mobile phone
- Daihatsu Hijet (S88), a kei truck and microvan
- HMS Tireless (S88), a submarine of the Royal Navy
- ISA-88, a standard addressing batch process control
- Märklin s88, a model railway control system
- S88 Zhengzhou–Xixia Expressway, China
- Skykomish State Airport, in Washington, United States
