= KPLU =

KPLU may refer to:

- KNKX (previously KPLU-FM), a public radio station licensed to Tacoma, Washington
- Pierce County Airport (ICAO code: KPLU), a county-owned public-use airport five nautical miles from Puyallup, Washington
