= W52 =

W52 may refer to:

- W52 (nuclear warhead)
- Chihoku Station, in Hokkaido, Japan
- Goheen Airport, in Clark County, Washington, United States
- W52–FC Porto, a road bicycle racing team
- W52, a Toyota W transmission
