= Quincy Municipal Airport =

Quincy Municipal Airport may refer to:

- Quincy Municipal Airport (Florida) in Quincy, Florida, United States
- Quincy Municipal Airport (Washington) in Quincy, Washington, United States
