= W56 (disambiguation) =

The W56 was an American thermonuclear warhead.

W56 may also refer to:

- Fly for Fun Airport, serving Vancouver, Washington
- Momponai Station, in Hokkaido, Japan
- W56, a Toyota W transmission
