= Goheen =

Goheen is a surname. Notable people with the surname include:

- Barry Goheen, American collegiate basketball player and attorney
- Charles A. Goheen (1843-1899), American Union soldier
- Earl Goheen (1895–1985), American football, basketball and baseball coach
- Gordon Goheen, owner of Goheen Airport
- John Lawrence Goheen (1883–1948), American missionary, educator and administrator
- Moose Goheen (1894–1979), American ice hockey player
- Robert F. Goheen (1919–2008), American academic administrator and diplomat
