= Anderson Airport =

Anderson Airport may refer to:

- Anderson Regional Airport in Anderson, South Carolina, US (FAA/IATA: AND)
- Anderson Municipal Airport in Anderson, Indiana, US (FAA/IATA: AID)
- Sigurd Anderson Airport in Webster, South Dakota, US (FAA: 1D7)

== See also ==
- Anderson Field (disambiguation)
