= 16S =

16S or 16s may refer to:

- Ribosomal RNAs, in biology:
  - prokaryotic 16S ribosomal RNA
  - mitochondrial 16S ribosomal RNA
- Myrtle Creek Municipal Airport's FAA identifier
- Fujitsu Micro 16s, a 1983 Business personal computer
- Sulfur (_{16}S), a chemical element

== See also ==
- S16 (disambiguation)
