= Moses Lake Airport =

Moses Lake Airport may refer to either of two general aviation airports serving Moses Lake, Washington:

- Moses Lake Municipal Airport
- Grant County International Airport
