= Willapa Harbor Airport =

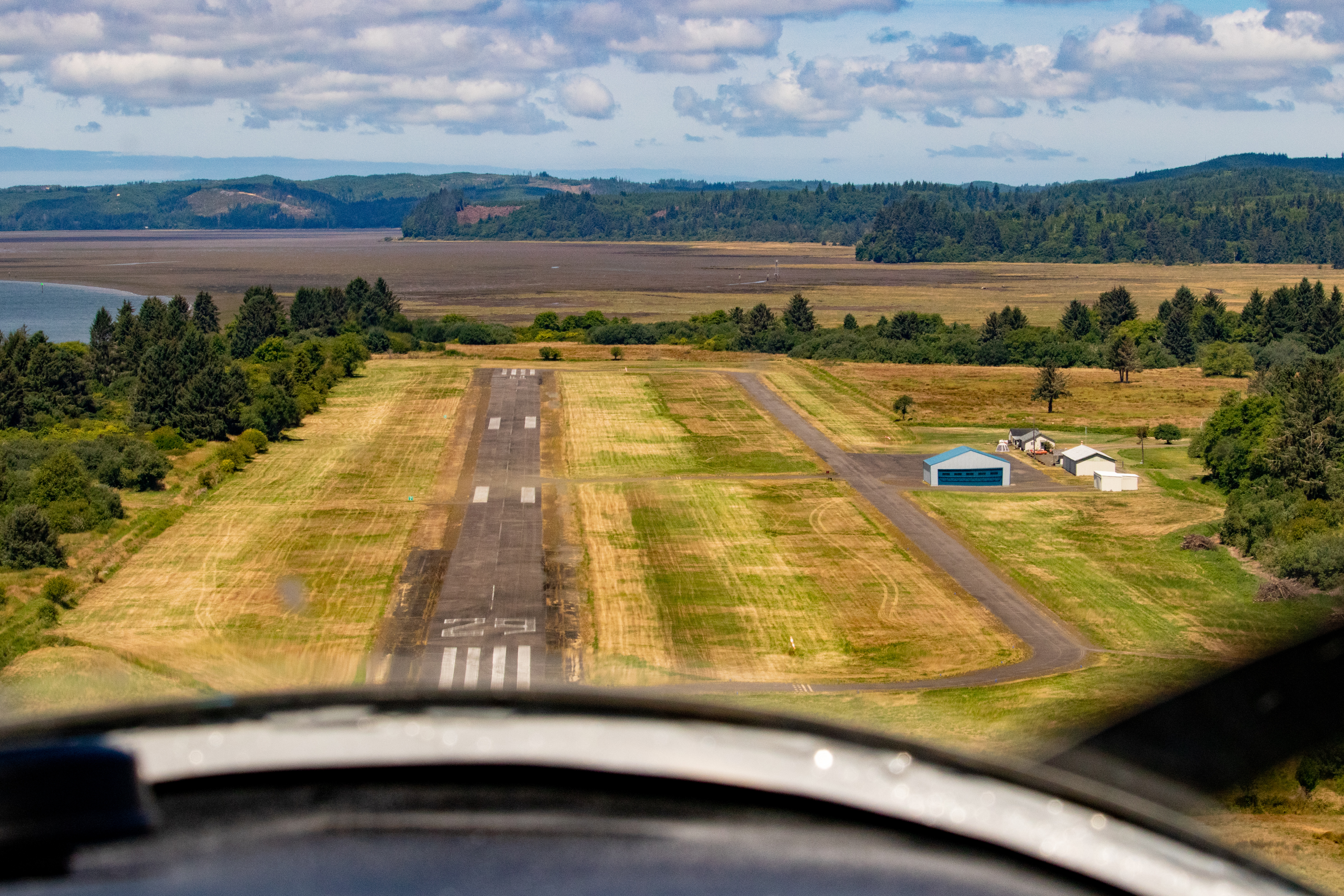
- landing at Willapa Harbor Airport
- IATA: none; ICAO: none; FAA LID: 2S9

Summary
- Airport type: Public/civil
- Location: Raymond, Washington
- Opened: 1946; 80 years ago
- Elevation AMSL: 13 ft / 4 m
- Coordinates: 46.6976°N 123.8234°W

Map

Runways
| Direction | Length | | Surface |
| Direction | ft | m | Surface |
|---|---|---|---|
| 11/29 | 3,005 | 916 | Asphalt |
- Source: Federal Aviation Administration

Willapa Harbor Airport (FAA LID: 2S9) is a public/civil-use airport located 2 mi (3.2 km) northwest of Raymond, Washington, United States.

Although most U.S. airports use the same three-letter location identifier for the FAA, ICAO and IATA, Willapa Harbor Airport is assigned 2S9 by the FAA but has no designation from the ICAO nor the IATA.

== Facilities ==
Willapa Harbor Airport covers an area of 147 acres (59 ha) which contains one asphalt paved runway (11/29) measuring 3,005 ft × 52 ft (916 m × 16 m). It was built in 1946 by the Coast Guard.

Approximately 4 aircraft are based at the airport with 850 operations per year in 2022.

== See also ==
- List of airports in Washington
