= Twisp Municipal Airport =

- IATA: none; ICAO: none; FAA LID: 2S0

Summary
- Airport type: Public
- Owner: Town of Twisp
- Serves: Twisp, Washington
- Elevation AMSL: 1,602 ft / 488 m
- Coordinates: 48°21′02″N 120°05′38″W
- Interactive map of Twisp Municipal Airport

Runways
| Direction | Length | | Surface |
| Direction | ft | m | Surface |
|---|---|---|---|
| 10/28 | 2,701 | 823 | Asphalt |

Statistics (2020)
- Aircraft operations: 7,700
- Based aircraft: 31
- Source: Federal Aviation Administration

Twisp Municipal Airport (FAA LID: 2S0) is a municipal-owned public-use airport located one nautical mile (1.85 km) southeast of the central business district of Twisp, a town in Okanogan County, Washington, United States.

== Facilities and aircraft ==
Twisp Municipal Airport covers an area of 40 acres (16 ha) at an elevation of 1,602 feet (488 m) above mean sea level. It has one runway designated 10/28 with an asphalt surface measuring 2,701 by 60 feet (823 x 18 m).

For the 12-month period ending December 31, 2020, the airport had 7,700 aircraft operations, an average of 21 per day: 97% general aviation, 1% air taxi, and 1% military. At that time there were 31 aircraft based at this airport: 30 single-engine, and 1 multi-engine.

== See also ==
- List of airports in Washington
