= Anderson Field =

Anderson Field may refer to:

- Anderson Field (Minnesota), a private airport in Kennedy, Minnesota, US (FAA: 52MN)
- Anderson Field (Nevada), the first airport in Las Vegas, Nevada, US (closed 1929)
- Anderson Field (Washington), a public airport in Brewster, Washington, US (FAA: S97)
