= Apex Airport =

- IATA: none; ICAO: none; FAA LID: 8W5

Summary
- Airport type: Private
- Owner/Operator: Apex Property Owners Improvement Association
- Location: Kitsap County, Washington, near Silverdale
- Built: 1946
- Time zone: Pacific (UTC-8)
  - Summer (DST): PDT (UTC-7)
- Elevation AMSL: 525 ft / 160 m
- Coordinates: 47°39′24″N 122°44′00″W
- Interactive map of Apex Airport

Apex Airport (or Airpark) is a private airstrip almost exactly two miles due west of Kitsap Mall in Silverdale, Washington, at elevation 525 feet (160 m). The runway, originally a bulldozed gravel strip, was built in 1946.

== See also ==
- List of airports in Washington
