= Lester State Ultralight Flightpark =

- IATA: none; ICAO: none; FAA LID: 15S

Summary
- Airport type: Public
- Owner: WSDOT Aviation Division
- Serves: Lester, Washington
- Opened: 1948
- Elevation AMSL: 1,693 ft / 516 m
- Coordinates: 47°12′54″N 121°27′44″W
- Interactive map of Lester State Ultralight Flightpark

Runways
| Direction | Length | | Surface |
| Direction | ft | m | Surface |
|---|---|---|---|
| 5/23 | 400 | 122 | Turf |

Helipads
| Number | Length | | Surface |
| Number | ft | m | Surface |
|---|---|---|---|
| H1 | 100 | 30 | Turf |
- Source: Federal Aviation Administration

Lester State Ultralight Flightpark (FAA LID: 15S) was a state-owned, public-use ultralight airport located two nautical miles (3.7 km) east of the central business district of Lester, a town in King County, Washington, United States. It is owned by the WSDOT Aviation Division and opened in 1948.

== Facilities ==
Lester State Ultralight Flightpark covered an area of 56 acres (23 ha) at an elevation of 1,693 feet (516 m) above mean sea level. It has one runway designated 5/23 with a turf surface measuring 400 by 100 feet (122 x 30 m). It also has one helipad designated H1 with a turf surface measuring 100 by 100 feet (30 x 30 m).

In 1989, the Green River washed away the runway, but it remained listed; the 2016 Airport/Facility Directory noted the runway was "closed indefinitely due to severe erosion from the river", and the grass helipad was available for emergency use.

== See also ==
- List of airports in Washington
