= Quillayute Airport =

Coordinates: 47°56′12″N 124°33′45″W

- IATA: UIL; ICAO: KUIL; FAA LID: UIL

Summary
- Airport type: Public
- Owner: City of Forks
- Serves: Forks, Washington
- Location: Quillayute, Washington
- Elevation AMSL: 194 ft / 59 m
- Interactive map of Quillayute Airport

Runways
Direction	Length		Surface
Direction	ft	m	Surface
4/22	4,211	1,284	Concrete

Statistics (2022)
- Aircraft operations: 6,700
- Source: Federal Aviation Administration

Quillayute Airport (IATA: UIL, ICAO: KUIL, FAA LID: UIL), formerly known as Quillayute State Airport, is a public airport located approximately 10 miles (16 km) west of the city of Forks, in Clallam County, Washington, United States. It is owned by the City of Forks. This former Naval Auxiliary Air Station was deeded to the City of Forks by the Washington State Department of Transportation in 1999.

== Facilities and aircraft ==
Quillayute Airport covers an area of 739 acres (299 ha). For the 12-month period ending December 31, 2022, the airport had 6,700 aircraft operations: 97% general aviation and 3% military.

The airport has two concrete runways, each one close to 5,000 feet (1,500 m) long. Runway 12/30 is closed (the north–south runway). Runway 4/22 is open with a displaced threshold of 1,089 feet (332 m). In the Master Planning effort currently underway, it is the intent, in the long-term plan, to remove the displacement on runway 4/22 in the future, and reopen runway 12/30 at a shortened length.

== Climate ==
Quillayute has a maritime west coast climate. The warmest month is August and the coldest month is December.

Climate data for Quillayute Airport, Washington (1991–2020 normals, (Note: Mean monthly maxima and minima (i.e. the highest and lowest temperature readings during an entire month or year) calculated based on data at said location from 1991 to 2020.) extremes 1966–present)
Month	Jan	Feb	Mar	Apr	May	Jun	Jul	Aug	Sep	Oct	Nov	Dec	Year
Record high °F (°C)	69 (21)	73 (23)	80 (27)	84 (29)	92 (33)	110 (43)	97 (36)	99 (37)	97 (36)	84 (29)	69 (21)	64 (18)	110 (43)
Mean maximum °F (°C)	57.5 (14.2)	60.1 (15.6)	64.3 (17.9)	70.7 (21.5)	77.7 (25.4)	80.7 (27.1)	84.5 (29.2)	86.7 (30.4)	81.9 (27.7)	72.2 (22.3)	59.8 (15.4)	55.4 (13.0)	90.6 (32.6)
Mean daily maximum °F (°C)	47.5 (8.6)	49.1 (9.5)	51.2 (10.7)	54.8 (12.7)	60.0 (15.6)	63.3 (17.4)	67.6 (19.8)	68.9 (20.5)	66.7 (19.3)	58.7 (14.8)	51.2 (10.7)	46.7 (8.2)	57.1 (14.0)
Daily mean °F (°C)	41.7 (5.4)	42.1 (5.6)	43.9 (6.6)	46.9 (8.3)	51.7 (10.9)	55.5 (13.1)	59.3 (15.2)	60.0 (15.6)	57.1 (13.9)	50.6 (10.3)	44.7 (7.1)	41.0 (5.0)	49.5 (9.8)
Mean daily minimum °F (°C)	35.9 (2.2)	35.2 (1.8)	36.7 (2.6)	38.9 (3.8)	43.4 (6.3)	47.7 (8.7)	51.0 (10.6)	51.1 (10.6)	47.5 (8.6)	42.4 (5.8)	38.1 (3.4)	35.3 (1.8)	41.9 (5.5)
Mean minimum °F (°C)	23.1 (−4.9)	23.8 (−4.6)	26.7 (−2.9)	29.7 (−1.3)	33.5 (0.8)	39.5 (4.2)	42.9 (6.1)	43.1 (6.2)	37.6 (3.1)	31.7 (−0.2)	25.6 (−3.6)	23.3 (−4.8)	19.7 (−6.8)
Record low °F (°C)	7 (−14)	11 (−12)	19 (−7)	23 (−5)	29 (−2)	33 (1)	38 (3)	36 (2)	28 (−2)	23 (−5)	5 (−15)	7 (−14)	5 (−15)
Average precipitation inches (mm)	15.59 (396)	9.73 (247)	11.78 (299)	8.11 (206)	4.25 (108)	3.30 (84)	1.58 (40)	2.64 (67)	4.56 (116)	10.68 (271)	15.26 (388)	13.84 (352)	101.32 (2,574)
Average snowfall inches (cm)	2.0 (5.1)	2.6 (6.6)	0.7 (1.8)	0.1 (0.25)	0.0 (0.0)	0.0 (0.0)	0.0 (0.0)	0.0 (0.0)	0.0 (0.0)	0.0 (0.0)	1.4 (3.6)	2.1 (5.3)	8.9 (22.65)
Average precipitation days (≥ 0.01 in)	22.2	18.9	22.2	19.2	15.0	14.5	9.0	8.8	11.1	17.8	21.9	22.5	203.1
Average snowy days (≥ 0.1 in)	1.7	1.9	0.8	0.4	0.0	0.0	0.0	0.0	0.0	0.0	0.9	1.3	7.0
Average relative humidity (%)	88.5	86.4	84.4	81.2	80.3	80.3	79.9	82.3	82.5	87.0	88.9	90.0	84.3
Mean monthly sunshine hours	55.4	80.3	115.0	147.4	170.6	167.8	209.7	194.8	173.2	112.7	55.3	48.1	1,530.3
Percentage possible sunshine	20	28	31	36	36	35	43	44	46	34	20	18	34
Source: NOAA (snow/snow days 1981–2010)

== See also ==
- List of airports in Washington
