= J-Z Airport =

- IATA: none; ICAO: none; FAA LID: 1W0

Summary
- Airport type: Public
- Owner: Town of Almira
- Serves: Almira, Washington
- Closed: 2008
- Elevation AMSL: 1,950 ft (590 m)
- Coordinates: 47°43′20″N 118°56′34″W

Map
- Location of airport in Washington

Runways
Direction	Length		Surface
Direction	ft	m	Surface
16/34	1,900	579	Turf/gravel

Statistics (2007)
- Aircraft operations: 50
- Sources: FAA, WSDOT

J-Z Airport (FAA LID: 1W0) was a town owned, public use airport. It closed in 2008. It was located one nautical mile (2 km) north of the central business district of Almira, a town in Lincoln County, Washington, United States.

== Facilities and aircraft ==
J-Z Airport covered an area of 15 acres (6 ha) at an elevation of 1,950 feet (594 m) above mean sea level. It had one runway designated 16/34 with a turf and gravel surface measuring 1,900 by 48 feet (579 x 15 m).

For the 12-month period ending December 31, 2007, the airport had 50 aircraft operations, all general aviation.
