= Hoskins Field (Washington) =

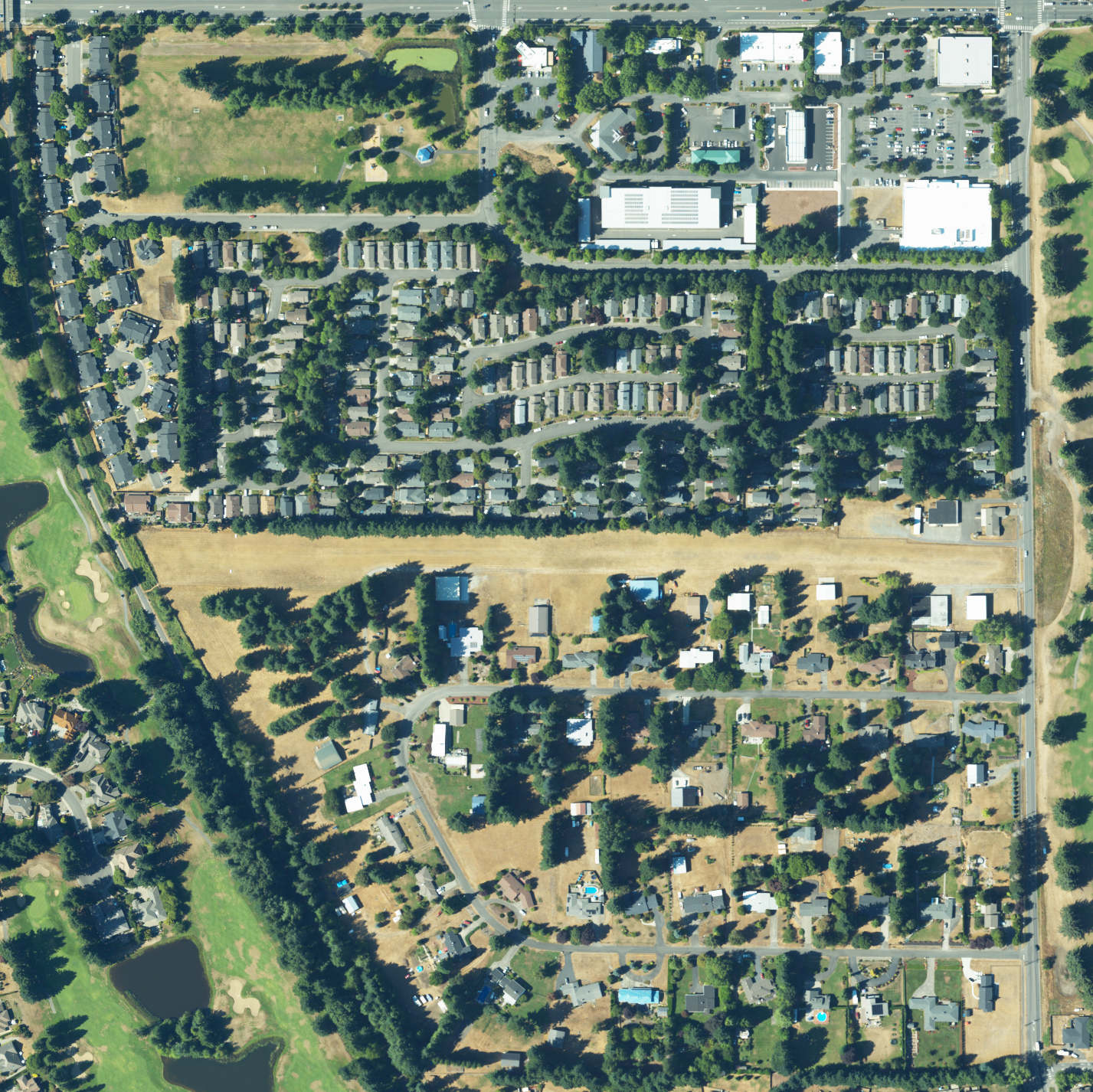
- Hoskins Field in August 2023
- IATA: none; ICAO: none; FAA LID: 44T

Summary
- Airport type: Public use
- Owner: Chambers Estate Association
- Serves: Olympia, Washington
- Elevation AMSL: 213 ft (65 m)
- Coordinates: 46°59′33″N 122°49′40″W
- Interactive map of Hoskins Field

Runways
| Direction | Length | | Surface |
| Direction | ft | m | Surface |
|---|---|---|---|
| 7/25 | 2,015 | 614 | Turf |

Statistics (2011)
- Aircraft operations: 450
- Based aircraft: 6
- Sources: FAA, WSDOT

Hoskins Field (FAA LID: 44T) is a privately owned, public use airport located five nautical miles (6 mi, 9 km) southeast of the central business district of Olympia, in Thurston County, Washington, United States.

== Facilities and aircraft ==
Hoskins Field covers an area of 5 acres (2.0 ha) at an elevation of 213 feet (65 m) above mean sea level. It has one runway designated 7/25 with a turf surface measuring 2,015 by 116 feet (614 x 35 m).

For the 12-month period ending May 31, 2011, the airport had 450 general aviation aircraft operations, an average of 37 per month. At that time there were 6 aircraft based at this airport, all single-engine.

== See also ==
- List of airports in Washington
