= Page Airport =

- IATA: none; ICAO: none; FAA LID: 9W2

Summary
- Airport type: Public
- Owner: Dr. Ronald D. Page
- Serves: Walla Walla, Washington
- Elevation AMSL: 800 ft / 244 m
- Coordinates: 46°00′59″N 118°22′14″W
- Interactive map of Page Airport

Runways
Direction	Length		Surface
Direction	ft	m	Surface
9/27	2,000	610	Turf
- Source: Federal Aviation Administration

Page Airport (FAA LID: 9W2, formerly 67WA) is a public use airport located two nautical miles (3.7 km) south of the central business district of Walla Walla, a city in Walla Walla County, Washington, United States.

== Facilities and aircraft ==
Page Airport covers an area of 27 acres (11 ha) at an elevation of 800 feet (244 m) above mean sea level. It has one runway designated 9/27 with a turf surface measuring 2,000 by 25 feet (610 x 8 m).

== See also ==
- List of airports in Washington
