= S16 =

S16 may refer to:

== Automobiles ==
- Chery QQme, a Chinese city car
- Peugeot 306 S16, a French family car
- Proton S16, a Malaysian subcompact car

== Aviation ==
- Copalis State Airport, in Grays Harbor County, Washington, United States
- Letov Š-16, a Czechoslovak biplane bomber
- Rans S-16 Shekari, an American acrobatic monoplane
- SIAI S.16, an Italian flying boat
- Sikorsky S-16 a Russian biplane fighter
- SPAD S.XVI, a French biplane bomber

== Rail and transit ==
- S16 (ZVV), a rail line of the Zürich S-Bahn
- Haruka Station, in Ōzu, Ehime Prefecture, Japan
- Higashi-ojima Station, in Kōtō, Tokyo, Japan
- Namba Station, in Chūō-ku, Osaka, Japan
- Seishin-minami Station, in Nishi-ku, Kobe, Japan
- Shioya Station (Hokkaido), in Otaru, Hokkaido, Japan
- Tsurusato Station, in Minami-ku, Nagoya, Aichi, Japan

== Roads ==
- Arlberg Schnellstraße, Austria
- Expressway S16 (Poland)
- County Route S16 (California), United States

== Vessels ==
- Brazilian submarine Amazonas (S16)
- HMS Oracle (S16), a submarine of the Royal Navy
- SMS S16 (1912), a torpedo boat of the Imperial German Navy
- USS S-16 (SS-121), a submarine of the United States Navy

== Other uses ==
- S16 (album), by French musician Woodkid
- 40S ribosomal protein S16
- British NVC community S16, a swamps and tall-herb fens community in the British National Vegetation Classification system
- S16: Keep away from sources of ignition - No smoking, a safety phrase
- S16 ribosomal protein leader
