= Port of Camas-Washougal =

Port on the Columbia River

The Port of Camas/Washougal is a port on the Columbia River serving the communities of Camas and Washougal, Washington in Clark County, Washington. The port was established in 1935 by a vote of the people in a special election and today encompasses the port, a marina, Grove Field airport and an industrial park. The port provides facilities and services for land, air, and water-borne use, and commerce to enhance employment and recreational opportunities for the communities of Camas and Washougal.

== Grove Field Airport ==
Grove Field is a municipal airport located north of Camas and is named in honor of Ward Grove. Grove founded the airstrip in 1945. The airport covers 105 acres (0.42 km^{2}) and offers 79 hangars, with 14 tie-downs for outside storage. Location: 45°37′40″N 122°24′17″W

== Industrial Park ==
The Industrial Park was established in 1966 when the United States Army Corps of Engineers created a 5.5-mile (8.9 km) levee along the Columbia River. Since its inception, the industrial park has seen significant development over the years and currently is home to 41 businesses employing approximately 900 employees with an annual payroll exceeding $27 million. Location: 45°34′10″N 122°20′16″W

== Marina ==
The marina was first developed while Commissioner Leighton Blake was serving his term (1953 to 1955) and now offers 356 moorage slips plus a 4-lane launch ramp with a large parking area for boat trailers and tow vehicles, an event center overlooking the east end of the Marina as well as a restaurant on the water called The Puffin Cafe, one yacht club, a self-service fuel dock, a boat repair/storage facility nearby, parking for self-contained RV’s, the Marina Park which hosts summertime concerts, and the Parker’s Landing Historical Park which details the history of the area. The marina is the homeport of the Dolphin Yacht Club. Location: 45°34′42″N 122°22′51″W
