= Waterville Airport =

Waterville Airport may refer to:

- Waterville Airport (Washington) in Waterville, Washington, U.S.
- Waterville/Kings County Municipal Airport in Waterville, Nova Scotia, Canada
- Waterville Regional Airport in Waterville, Maine, U.S.
