= Crest Airfield =

Coordinates: 47°20′14″N 122°06′13″W

- IATA: none; ICAO: none; FAA LID: S36

Summary
- Airport type: Public
- Owner: Crest Airfield, LLC
- Location: Kent, Washington
- Elevation AMSL: 472 ft (144 m)
- Website: https://crestairfield.aero/
- Interactive map of Crest Airfield

Runways
Direction	Length		Surface
Direction	ft	m	Surface
15/33	3,288	1,002	Asphalt

Statistics (2005)
- Aircraft operations: 99,000
- Based aircraft: 332
- Source: Federal Aviation Administration

Crest Airfield (FAA LID: S36), formerly Norman Grier Field (FAA LID: S36), and before that Crest Airpark, is a public airport located five miles (8 km) southeast of the central business district of Kent, a city in King County, Washington, United States.

Crest Airfield is owned by Crest Airfield, LLC (CALLC), a subsidiary of the Flying Acres Homeowners Association (FAHA). FAHA, through its subsidiary, New Crest Airpark, LLC, purchased the airport on July 31, 2024. New Crest Airpark, LLC was renamed to Crest Airfield, LLC in February of 2026 to align with renaming the airport to Crest Airfield on March 19, 2026. CALLC owns and operates the airport. Aircraft rental, maintenance services, and flight instruction are offered by third parties located on the airport.

FAHA represents the surrounding homeowners that live in the four divisions of Flying Acres and two other adjacent parcels not part of the development. All have access either directly to the airport or via taxiways.

== History ==
Crest Airpark was developed in 1963 by Al and Virginia Knechtel as a public use privately owned airport. The ownership changed in 1967 when Virginia Knechtel married Stan Neslund following Al Knechtel's death in an airplane accident in 1966. The first of four Flying Acres subdivisions with airpark access was developed in 1970. As of 2024, 118 Flying Acres properties have airport access. In 1974, Bill Lardent and Norman Grier bought the airport property. The Flying Acres subdivisions surrounding the airport remained the property of Stan and Virginia Neslund. Norm Grier purchased total interest of the airport from Bill Lardent in 1980. Norman Grier owned the airport until his death in 2017. It was renamed Norman Grier Field after his death. The airport remained the property of the Grier family and was operated by Norm Grier's daughter, Rikki Birge, until July 31, 2025, when it was sold to, Flying Acres Homeowners Association (FAHA). The association holds and manages the property through Crest Airfield, LLC. The airport was renamed to Crest Airfield effective March 19, 2026.

== Facilities and aircraft ==
Crest Airfield covers an area of 66 acres (27 ha) which contains one asphalt paved runway (15/33) measuring 3,288 x 40 ft (1,002 x 12 m).

100LL fuel is available pay at the pump near the FBO.

For the 12-month period ending December 31, 2005, the airport had 99,000 general aviation aircraft operations, an average of 271 per day. There are 332 aircraft based at this airport: 98% single-engine and 2% multi-engine.

== See also ==
- List of airports in Washington
