= Bandera State Airport =

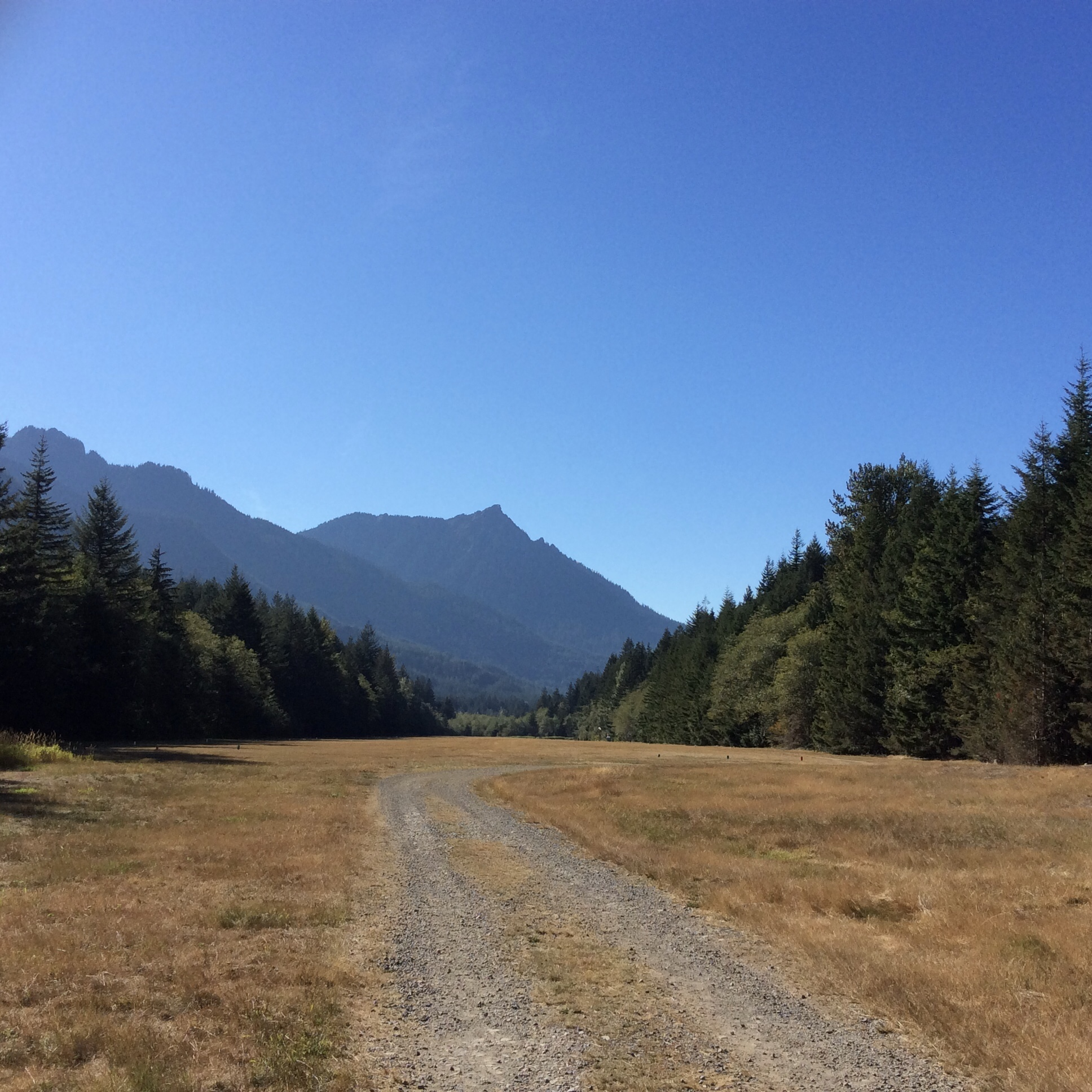
- Runway of Bandera State Airport
- IATA: none; ICAO: none; FAA LID: 4W0

Summary
- Airport type: Public
- Owner: WSDOT Aviation Division
- Serves: Bandera, Washington
- Elevation AMSL: 1,636 ft (499 m)
- Coordinates: 47°23′43″N 121°32′11″W
- Interactive map of Bandera State Airport

Runways
Direction	Length		Surface
Direction	ft	m	Surface
8/26	2,344	714	Turf

Statistics (2008)
- Aircraft operations: 300
- Source: Federal Aviation Administration

Bandera State Airport (FAA LID: 4W0) is a public airport located in Bandera, King County, Washington, United States. It is owned by the Washington State DOT Aviation Division.

This airport was built in 1948 as one of the first state airports. It is located in the upper Snoqualmie Valley, 14 miles (23 km) east of North Bend, Washington. The airport is a few feet away from Interstate 90 and is an excellent location for mountain flying practice. Though surrounded by mountains, the valley is wide enough for maneuvering most light aircraft. The airport is often used by instructors for training students in soft field work and in mountain flying. Glider clubs frequently base out of Bandera.

== Facilities and aircraft ==
Bandera State Airport covers an area of 25 acres (10 ha) with one runway designated 8/26. The runway has a turf surface measuring 2,344 by 200 feet (714 x 61 m) which is extremely soft when wet.

Field elevation is 1,636 feet (499 m) above mean sea level, and some density altitude problems can be encountered on a summer day. Trees surround the airport, and there are trees close to each end of the field in the approaches. Elk, deer and motorcyclists may be encountered on the field. The surface is rough, and vehicle ruts and frost heaved rocks are possible. The south third of the runway is almost always soft, and it is generally smoother on the far end. Overflight to check for surface damage, presence of obstructions, and height of grass is essential. The airport is typically open from June 1 to October 1.

For the 12-month stretch ending on December 31, 2020, the airport had 300 general aviation aircraft operations, an average of 25 per calendar month (or 75 per month during the 4 month season that the airport is open).

== See also ==
- List of airports in Washington
