= Port of Whitman Business Air Center Airport =

Airport in Colfax, Washington

- IATA: none; ICAO: none; FAA LID: S94

Summary
- Airport type: Public
- Owner/Operator: Port of Whitman County
- Serves: Colfax, Washington
- Elevation AMSL: 2,181 ft / 665 m
- Coordinates: 46°51′31″N 117°24′50″W
- Website: portwhitman.com

Map
- Location of airport in Washington S94 (the United States)

Runways
Direction	Length		Surface
Direction	ft	m	Surface
8/26	3,209	978	Asphalt

Statistics
- Aircraft operations (2016): 15,000
- Based aircraft (2018): 15
- Source: Federal Aviation Administration

Port of Whitman Business Air Center, (FAA LID: S94) is a public use airport located 3 miles (5 km) southwest of the central business district of Colfax, a city in Whitman County, Washington, United States. It is included in the Federal Aviation Administration (FAA) National Plan of Integrated Airport Systems for 2017–2021, in which it is categorized as a basic general aviation facility.

This airport is assigned location identifier S94 by the FAA but, unlike most airports in the United States, has no designation from the International Air Transport Association (IATA).

== Facilities and aircraft ==
Port of Whitman Business Air Center covers an area of 64 acres (26 ha) at an elevation of 2,181 feet (665 m) above mean sea level. It has one runway: 8/26 is 3,209 by 60 feet (978 x 18 m) with an asphalt surface.

In 2016, the airport had 15,000 aircraft operations, an average of 41 per day: all general aviation.

In January 2018, there were 15 aircraft based at this airport: 13 single-engine, 1 multi-engine, and 1 ultra-light.

== See also ==
- List of airports in Washington
