= Fly for Fun Airport =

- IATA: none; ICAO: none; FAA LID: W56

Summary
- Airport type: Public use
- Owner: George Manley
- Serves: Vancouver, Washington
- Elevation AMSL: 297 ft (91 m)
- Coordinates: 45°41′14″N 122°31′19″W

Map
- Location of airport in Washington W56 (the United States)

Runways
Direction	Length		Surface
Direction	ft	m	Surface
7/25	2,434	742	Turf

Statistics (2022)
- Aircraft operations: 3,600
- Based aircraft: 12
- Source: Federal Aviation Administration

Fly for Fun Airport (FAA LID: W56) is a privately owned, public use airport located four nautical miles (5 mi, 7 km) northeast of the central business district of Vancouver, a city in Clark County, Washington, United States.

== Facilities and aircraft ==
Fly for Fun Airport covers an area of 15 acres (6 ha) at an elevation of 297 feet (91 m) above mean sea level. It has one runway designated 7/25 with a turf surface measuring 2,434 by 50 feet (742 x 15 m).

For the 12-month period ending December 31, 2022, the airport had 3,600 general aviation aircraft operations, an average of 69 per week. At that time there were 12 aircraft based at this airport, all single-engine.

== See also ==
- Grove Field
- Hillsboro Airport
- List of airports in Washington
- Pearson Air Museum
- Pearson Field
- Portland International Airport
- Portland-Troutdale Airport
- Swan Island Municipal Airport
