= Moses Lake Municipal Airport =

Public airport in Washington, United States

- IATA: WA40; ICAO: WA40; FAA LID: W20

Summary
- Airport type: Public
- Owner: City of Moses Lake
- Operator: Airport Commission
- Serves: Moses Lake
- Elevation AMSL: 1,205 ft (367 m)
- Coordinates: 47°8′35″N 119°14′29″W
- Website: http://www.cityofml.com/index.aspx?NID=240

Map
- Location of airport in Washington WA40 (the United States)

Runways
Direction	Length		Surface
Direction	ft	m	Surface
16/34	2,482	757	Asphalt

Moses Lake Municipal Airport (IATA: WA40, ICAO: WA40, FAA LID: W20) is a public use airport located within the city of Moses Lake. The airport property was deeded to the city in 1947 by the Northern Pacific Railroad. Since 1994, operations at the Municipal Airport have been overseen by the Airport Commission. In February 2021, the wording of closure conditions for the airport was changed by the city to promote development.

== See also ==
- List of airports in Washington
