= Waterville Airport (Washington) =

Coordinates: 47°39′22″N 120°03′23″W

- IATA: none; ICAO: none; FAA LID: 2S5

Summary
- Airport type: Public
- Owner: Port of Douglas County
- Serves: Waterville, Washington
- Elevation AMSL: 2,645 ft (806 m)
- Interactive map of Waterville Airport

Runways
Direction	Length		Surface
Direction	ft	m	Surface
7/25	2,978	908	Asphalt

Statistics (2021)
- Aircraft operations: 1,000
- Source: Federal Aviation Administration

Waterville Airport (FAA LID: 2S5) is a public airport located one mile (2 km) northeast of the central business district of Waterville, a town in Douglas County, Washington, United States. It is owned by the Port of Douglas County.

== Facilities and aircraft ==
Waterville Airport covers an area of 20 acres (8.1 ha) which contains one runway designated 7/25 with a 2,978 x 50 ft (908 x 15 m) asphalt pavement.

For the 12-month period ending December 31, 2021, the airport had 1,000 general aviation aircraft operations, average 83 per month.

== See also ==
- List of airports in Washington
