= Skykomish State Airport =

- IATA: none; ICAO: none; FAA LID: S88

Summary
- Airport type: Public/civil
- Location: Skykomish, Washington
- Opened: January 10, 1949; 77 years ago
- Elevation AMSL: 1,002 ft / 305 m
- Coordinates: 47°42′40″N 121°20′19″W

Map

Runways
Direction	Length		Surface
Direction	ft	m	Surface
06/24	2,050	625	Turf
- Source: Federal Aviation Administration

Skykomish State Airport (FAA LID: S88) is a public/civil-use airport located 1 mi (1.6 km) east of Skykomish, Washington, United States.

Although most U.S. airports use the same three-letter location identifier for the FAA, ICAO and IATA, Skykomish State Airport is assigned S88 by the FAA but has no designation from the ICAO nor the IATA.

== Facilities ==
Skykomish State Airport covers an area of 35 acres (14 ha) which contains one asphalt paved runway (06/24) measuring 2,050 ft × 100 ft (625 m × 30 m).

== See also ==
- List of airports in Washington
