= Centre Island (Te Anau) =

Island in New Zealand

Native name: Tihaka
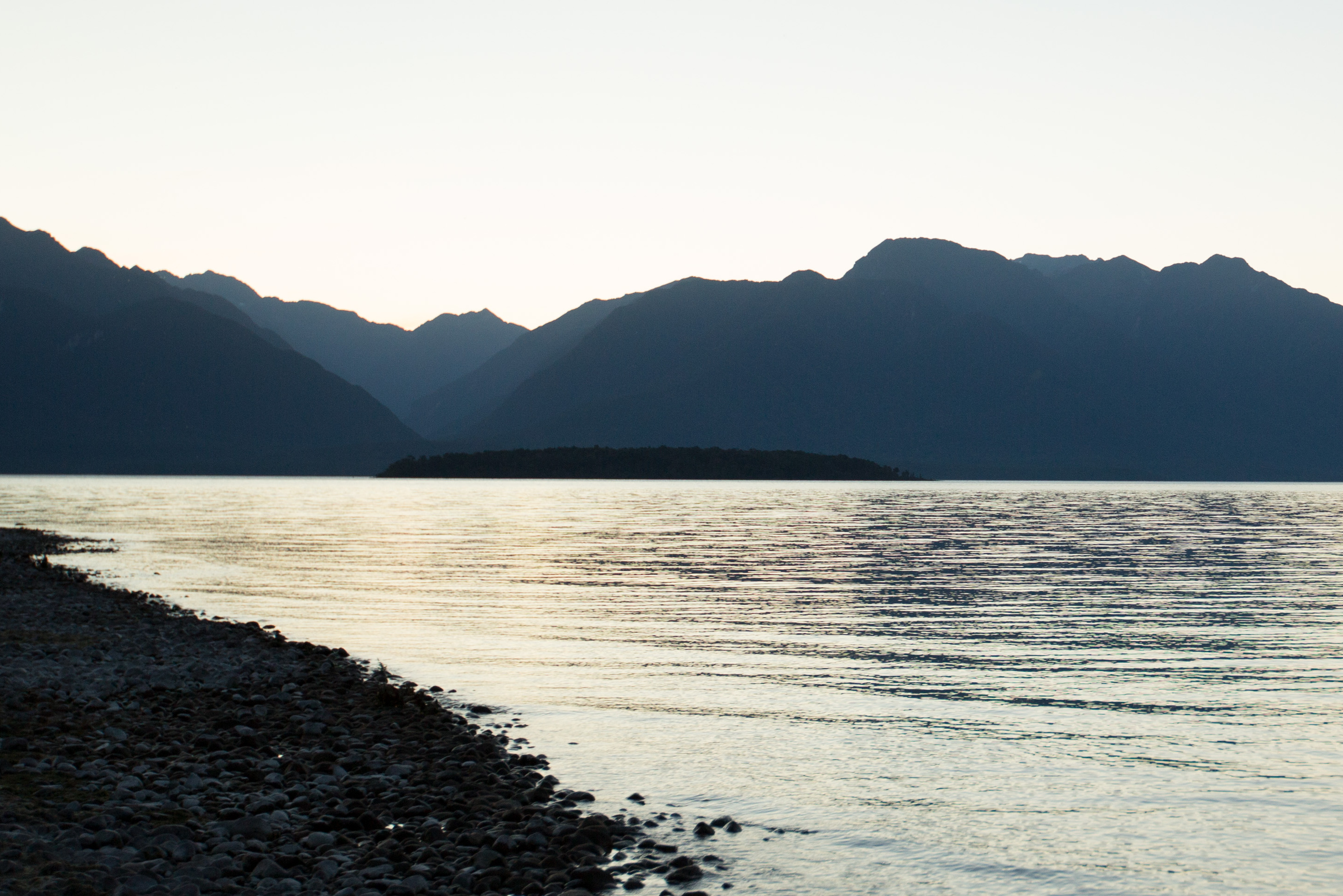
- Centre Island seen from Henry Creek Campsite

- Location of Centre Island in Fiordland
- Interactive map of Centre Island

Geography
- Location: Fiordland
- Coordinates: 45°14′04″S 167°46′24″E

Administration
- New Zealand

Demographics
- Population: 0

Centre Island is a small island in Lake Te Anau in the Southland Region of New Zealand. About 600 m long by 300 m wide, it has been identified as an Important Bird Area by BirdLife International because it supports a breeding colony of bronze shags.

== See also ==
- Desert island
- List of islands
