= Easton State Airport =

- IATA: ESW; ICAO: KESW; FAA LID: ESW

Summary
- Airport type: Public
- Owner: WSDOT Aviation Division
- Serves: Easton, Washington
- Elevation AMSL: 2,226 ft (678 m)
- Coordinates: 47°15′15″N 121°11′08″W
- Interactive map of Easton State Airport

Runways
Direction	Length		Surface
Direction	ft	m	Surface
9/27	2,640	805	Turf

Statistics (2007)
- Aircraft operations: 300
- Source: Federal Aviation Administration

Easton State Airport (IATA: ESW, ICAO: KESW, FAA LID: ESW) is a public use airport located two nautical miles (3.7 km) north of the central business district of Easton, in Kittitas County, Washington, United States. It is owned by the Washington State Department of Transportation's Aviation Division.

It was constructed in the 1930s by the federal government as an emergency field for DC-3s crossing the Cascades through Snoqualmie Pass. It was acquired by the state in 1958 to preserve it for future use. Easton remains as an important airport on the eastern approaches to Snoqualmie and Stampede Pass.

== Facilities and aircraft ==
Easton State Airport covers an area of 28 acres (11 ha) and has a runway designated 9/27 with a turf surface measuring 2,640 by 100 feet (805 by 30 m), with a 300 feet (91 m) displaced threshold on the west end.

Field elevation is 2,226 feet (678 m), and density altitude problems can be encountered in the summer. Trees surround the airport and there are trees in both approaches close in. Deer, elk, and motorcyclists also enjoy the airport. The surface is somewhat rough, and will be soft when wet. An overflight is recommended to check field conditions and obstructions. The airport is generally open from June 1 to October 1.

For the 12-month period ending May 31, 2007, the airport had 300 general aviation aircraft operations, an average of 25 per month. It is an excellent facility for mountain flying / soft field practice. Glider and flying clubs frequently use the field during the summer.

== See also ==
- List of airports in Washington
