= Beebe Steven Lynk =

American chemist

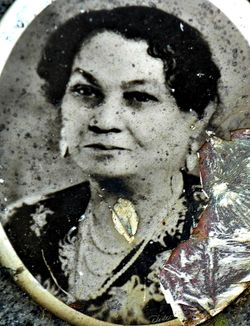
- Born: Beebe Steven; October 24, 1872; Mason, Tennessee
- Died: 11 November 1948 (aged 76); Memphis, Tennessee
- Education: Lane College; University of West Tennessee
- Known for: Helping found University of West Tennessee; Advice to Colored Women (1896); A Complete Course in Hair Straightening and Beauty Culture (1919)
- Spouse: Miles Vandahurst Lynk
- Scientific career
- Fields: Pharmaceutical Chemistry; Medical Latin
- Workplaces: University of West Tennessee

Beebe Steven Lynk (1872–1948) served as the professor of medical Latin botany and materia medica at the University of West Tennessee. She was one of the first female African American professors in the country. She was also an active member of the early black women's club movement and an author.

== Early life ==
Lynk was born in Mason, Tennessee, on October 24, 1872. She was the daughter of Henderson Stevens and Jule Ann (Boyce) Stevens. She earned a degree from Lane College in Jackson, Tennessee, in 1892 at the age of 20. While it is known that she graduated with a bachelors degree in 1892, it is unknown if she attended school early or if the degree she completed was only 2 years long. While there is not accurate documentation of the curriculum for the degree Beebe Steven Lynk received at Lane College, at the time that she would have attended, the college's degree options were in preaching and teaching.

On April 12, 1893, Lynk married Dr. Miles Vandahurst Lynk, the creator of the first medical journal published by an African American, Medical and Surgical Observer. Together, they founded the University of Western Tennessee. Lynk gained a Ph. C. (a degree in Pharmaceutical Chemistry) from the University of West Tennessee in 1903. This was a two-year, pre-bachelor's degree, that Beebe obtained after her original bachelor's degree; in order to be able to practice and teach Pharmaceutical Chemistry.

== Career ==
After graduating from Lane College with her first degree, she taught in Tipton county for few years.The University of West Tennessee was founded by her and her husband Miles Lynk in 1900 in the town of Jackson, TN but was then moved to Memphis in 1907. They obtained the funding for the university by mortaging their home. The university followed the motto, " 'for the purpose of furnishing thorough courses in the profession, regardless of race and color' and 'for the purpose of furnishing facilities for higher education of Afro-American youth'". After earning her Ph.C at the university, she soon became one of the ten collegiate professors of the university (one out of two being female). Following the Flexner Report in 1910, the university faced some challenges regarding its credibility. The purpose of this report was to analyze medical school programs and standardize them across the nation. The author and developer Abraham Flexner often gave African American medical schools harsh criticism. In June 1908, the Council of Medical Education stated that the University of West Tennessee and two other African American medical universities were unfit and suggested that doctors from these institutions should not be recognized. Despite the criticism, the university remained open until their closure in 1923 due to financial struggles.

In addition to teaching, Lynk wrote a book called Advice to Colored Women (1896) and was active in the African-American women's club movement. An advocate for women's rights, she was a member of the National Federation of Women's Clubs, serving as Treasurer of the Tennessee State Federation of that organization. Her book reflected the organization's mission of advancing the status of African-American women through education and respectability. In 1919, Mrs. Lynk published a school textbook titled A Complete Course in Hair Straightening and Beauty Culture. In this textbook, Lynk provided chemical recipes for beauty treatments that could be done at home. In the preface of the textbook she mentions her hope that the information would provide success, happiness, and prosperity to women.

== Death and additional information ==
Beebe Steven Lynk died on November 11, 1948, of a stomach carcinoma in Memphis, Tennessee. Very little information is known about her life, in part because the University of West Tennessee no longer exists. Further sources on her may be available through the Tennessee State archives.

== See also ==
- Alice Ball
- List of African-American inventors and scientists
