= Copalis State Airport =

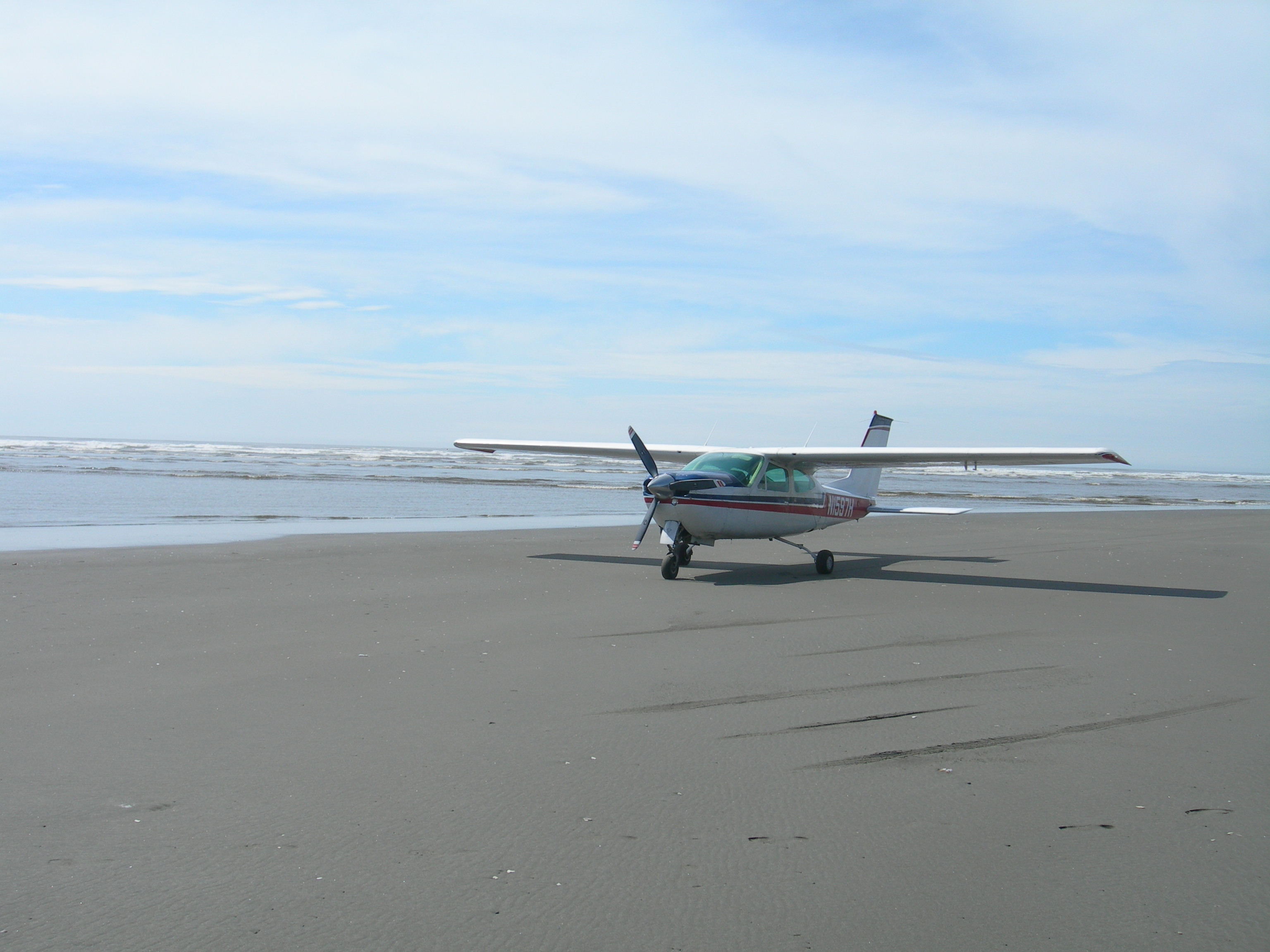
- IATA: none; ICAO: none; FAA LID: S16

Summary
- Airport type: Public
- Owner: Washington State DOT Aviation Division
- Location: Copalis Beach, Washington
- Elevation AMSL: 1 ft (0.30 m)
- Coordinates: 47°08′31″N 124°11′24″W

Map
- Location of airport in Washington S16 (the United States)

Runways
Direction	Length		Surface
Direction	ft	m	Surface
14/32	4,500	1,372	Sand

Statistics (2011)
- Aircraft operations: 200
- Source: Federal Aviation Administration and wsdot.wa.gov

Copalis State Airport (FAA LID: S16) is a state owned, public use airport in Grays Harbor County, Washington, United States. Formerly known as Copalis Beach State Airport, it is located near Copalis Beach, Washington.

The airstrip is located on an ocean beach near the mouth of the Copalis River, in the North Beach Seashore Conservation Area, adjacent to the Olympic Coast National Marine Sanctuary. It is the only airport in Washington State where landing on the beach is legal.

== Facilities and aircraft ==
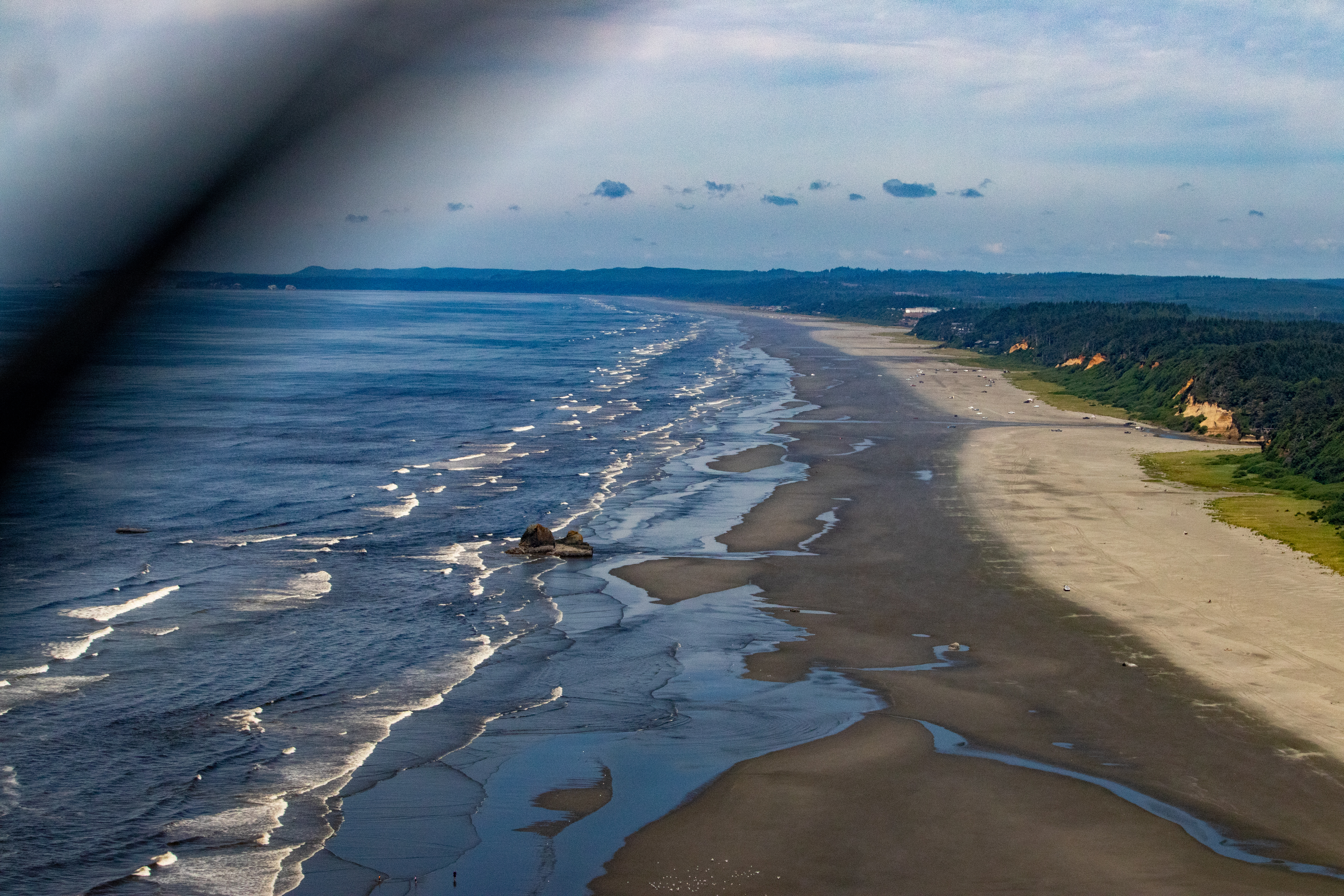
The section of beach that is Copalis State Airport, Copalis, Washington.

Copalis State Airport covers an area of 16 acres (6.5 ha) at an elevation of 1 foot (0.30 m) above mean sea level. It has one runway designated 14/32 with a sand surface measuring 4,500 by 150 feet (1,372 x 46 m).

The runway is a stretch of ocean beach from the Copalis River on the south to the rocks a mile north. It is only available during low tide. Due to river migration and beach erosion, the runway length has been reduced by approximately 1,100 feet (335 m).

For the 12-month period ending May 31, 2011, the airport had 200 general aviation aircraft operations, an average of 16 per month.

== See also ==
- List of airports in Washington
