= Cedars North Airpark =

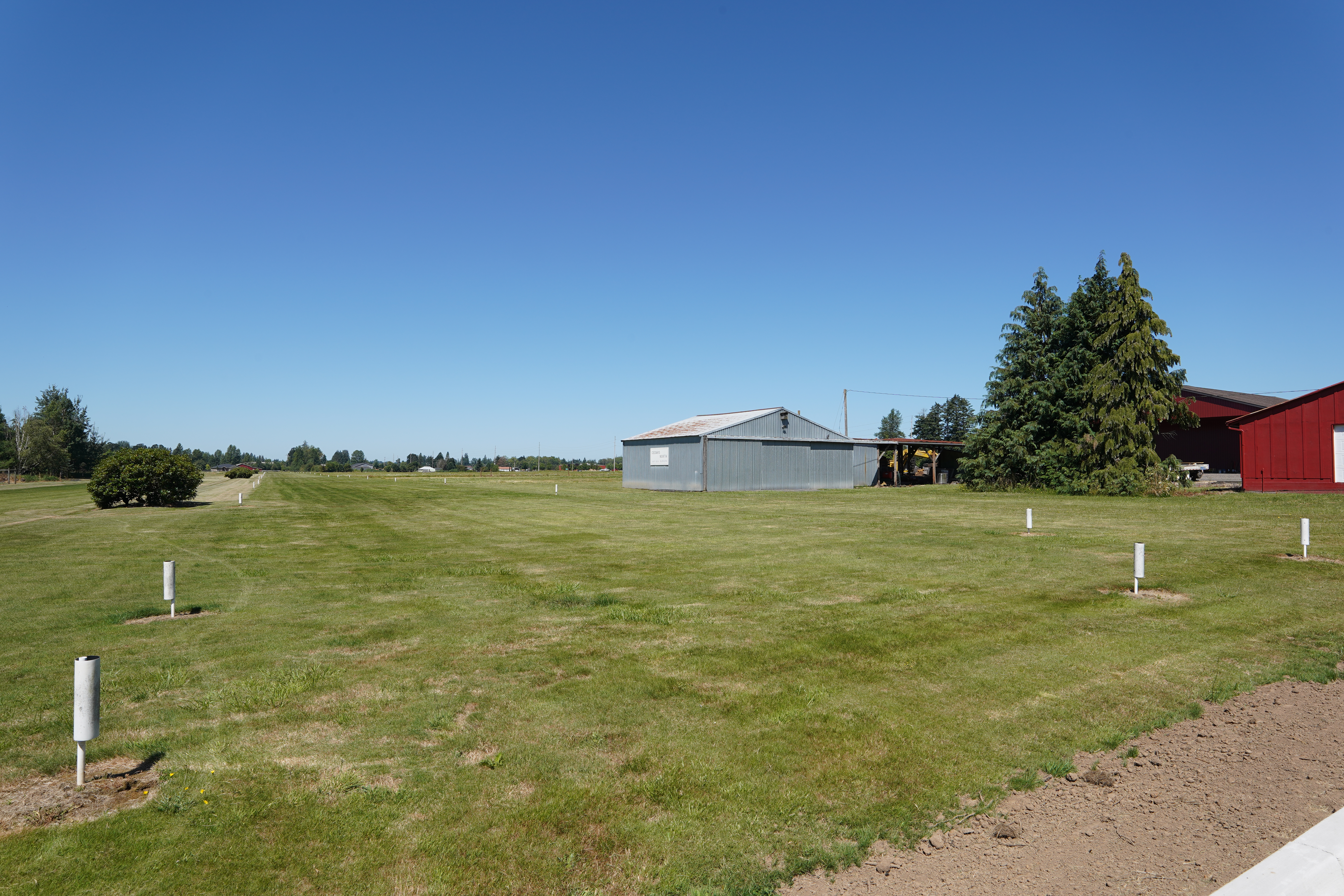
- IATA: none; ICAO: none; FAA LID: W58

Summary
- Airport type: Public use
- Owner: Cedars Homeowners Association
- Serves: Battle Ground, Washington
- Elevation AMSL: 275 ft (84 m)
- Coordinates: 45°45′52″N 122°30′54″W

Map
- Location of airport in Washington W58 (the United States)

Runways
Direction	Length		Surface
Direction	ft	m	Surface
8/26	1,960	597	Turf

Statistics (2012)
- Aircraft operations: 1,000
- Based aircraft: 8
- Source: Federal Aviation Administration

Cedars North Airpark (FAA LID: W58) is a privately owned, public use airport located one nautical mile (2 km) southeast of the central business district of Battle Ground, a city in Clark County, Washington, United States.

== Facilities and aircraft ==
Cedars North Airpark covers an area of 6 acres (2 ha) at an elevation of 275 feet (84 m) above mean sea level. It has one runway designated 8/26 with a turf surface measuring 1,960 by 50 feet (597 x 15 m).

For the 12-month period ending July 30, 2012, the airport had 1,000 general aviation aircraft operations, an average of 83 per month. At that time, there were eight aircraft based at this airport, all single engine.

== See also ==
- List of airports in Washington
