= Center Island Airport =

- IATA: CWS; ICAO: none; FAA LID: 78WA

Summary
- Airport type: Private
- Owner: Center Island Association
- Location: Center Island, San Juan County, Washington
- Elevation AMSL: 115 ft (35 m)
- Coordinates: 48°29′24″N 122°49′54″W

Map
- Location of airport in Washington CWS (the United States)

Runways
Direction	Length		Surface
Direction	ft	m	Surface
17/35	1,600	488	Turf/gravel
- Source: Federal Aviation Administration

Center Island Airport (IATA: CWS, FAA LID: 78WA) is a private use airport located on Center Island, in San Juan County, Washington, United States. The airport is owned by the Center Island Association. It was included in the National Plan of Integrated Airport Systems for 2011–2015, which categorized it as a general aviation facility.

Center Island Airport is a "turf-gravel" runway approximately 1600 feet long by 100 feet wide.

== See also ==
- List of airports in Washington
