= Grove Field =

Coordinates: 45°37′40″N 122°24′16″W

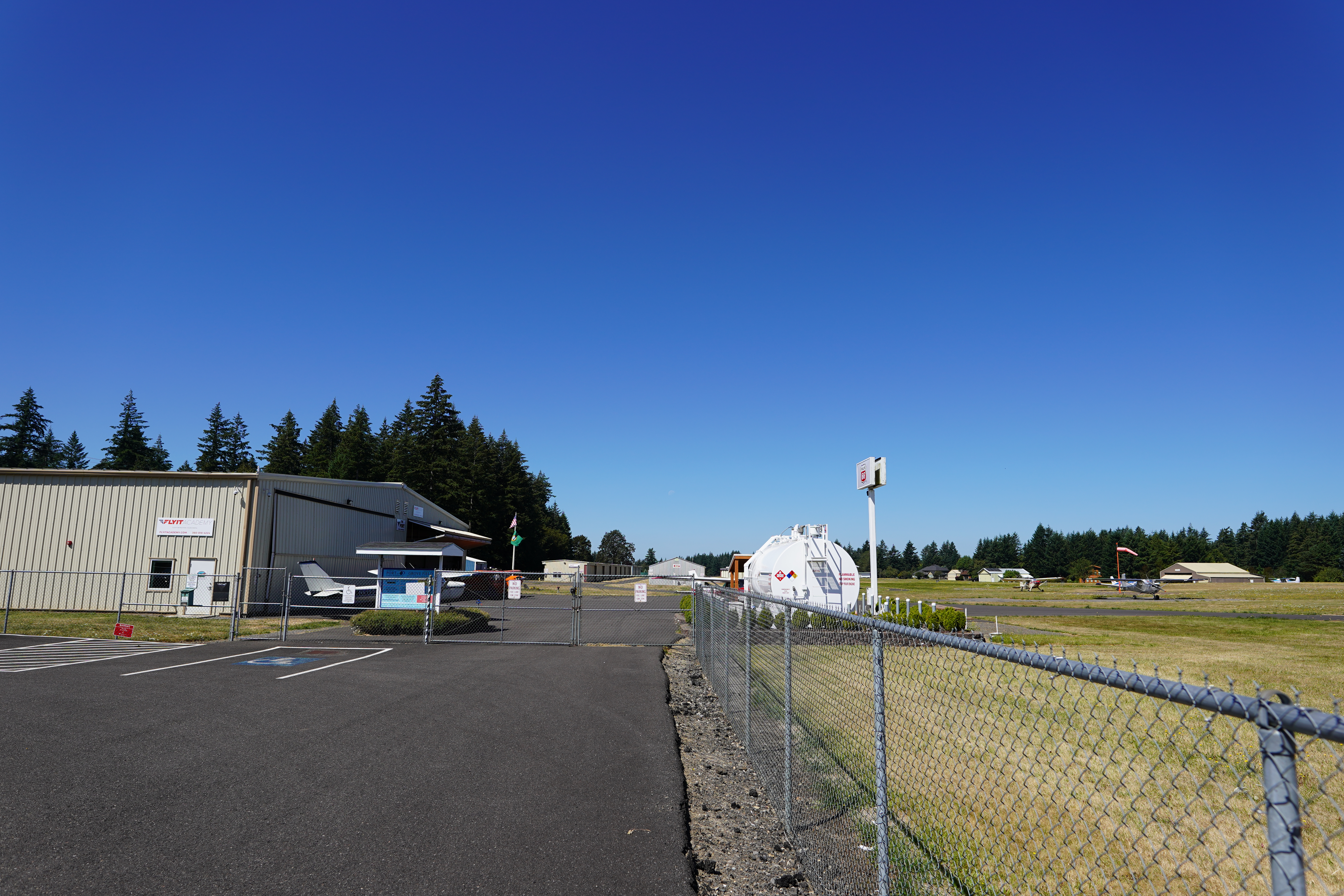
- IATA: none; ICAO: none; FAA LID: 1W1

Summary
- Airport type: Public
- Owner: Port of Camas - Washougal
- Serves: Camas, Washington
- Elevation AMSL: 429 ft (131 m)
- Interactive map of Grove Field

Runways
Direction	Length		Surface
Direction	ft	m	Surface
7/25	2,710	826	Asphalt

Statistics (2007)
- Aircraft operations: 10,000
- Based aircraft: 86
- Source: Federal Aviation Administration

Grove Field (FAA LID: 1W1) is a public airport located three miles (5 km) north of the central business district of Camas, a city in Clark County, Washington, United States. It is located near Lacamas Lake which has a seaplane base. Due to the closing of Evergreen Field, many aircraft have moved to Grove Field.

== Facilities and aircraft ==
Grove Field covers an area of 23 acres (9.3 ha) which contains one runway (7/25) with a 2,710 x 40 ft (826 x 12 m) asphalt pavement. For the 12-month period ending May 31, 2007, the airport had 10,000 general aviation aircraft operations, an average of 27 per day. At that time there were 86 aircraft based at this airport: 99% single-engine and 1% multi-engine. Flight training, aircraft rental and minor maintenance services are available at Grove.

== History ==
The air field is named for Ward Grove who built the airfield in 1945. Grove moved to Vancouver, Washington in 1924 and learned to fly in Portland, Oregon at the Rankin Flying School operated by Tex Rankin. During World War II, Grove taught flying in California and returned to Clark County, Washington after the war. The Port of Camas-Washougal bought the airstrip from him in 1961 and in 1984, the Port Commission voted to name the field in his honor. Grove died in 1993. A fire on October 6, 2014, did $1 million in damage to 10 hangars at the airport.

== See also ==
- List of airports in Washington
