= Waterville Township =

Waterville Township may refer to the following townships in the United States:

- Waterville Township, Kansas
- Waterville Township, Le Sueur County, Minnesota
- Waterville Township, Lucas County, Ohio
