= University of West Tennessee College of Medicine and Surgery =

The University of West Tennessee College of Medicine and Surgery (UWT) is a defunct black medical college organized in 1900 by Dr. Miles Vandahurst Lynk and Beebe Steven Lynk. UWT was initially established in Jackson, Tennessee, and later moved to Memphis in 1907. As one of the 14 black medical school of medicine established in the South following the end of the Civil War, the objective of UWT was to create educational opportunities in the medical field for people of color. The majority of black physicians who graduated from medical schools during the late nineteenth century and early twentieth century attended institutions founded by African Americans.

UWT graduated at least 155 physicians, as well as a number of pharmacists, nurses, dentists through during its 23 years of existence. Alumni from UWT were predominantly from the United States; although there is evidence of a few international graduates from countries such as Panama, Brazil, Liberia and the Philippines.

The school closed its doors in 1923, largely due to the consequences of the Flexner Report.
