= Richland Airport (Washington) =

Airport in Washington, United States

- IATA: RLD; ICAO: KRLD; FAA LID: RLD

Summary
- Airport type: Public
- Owner: Port of Benton
- Serves: Richland, Washington
- Time zone: Pacific Standard (UTC−8)
  - Summer (DST): Pacific Daylight (UTC−7)
- Elevation AMSL: 394 ft (120 m)
- Coordinates: 46°18′20″N 119°18′15″W

Map
- Location in Washington RLD (the United States)

Runways
Direction	Length		Surface
Direction	ft	m	Surface
1/19	4,009	1,222	Asphalt
8/26	3,995	1,218	Asphalt

Statistics (2007)
- Aircraft operations: 29,000
- Based aircraft: 202
- Source: Federal Aviation Administration

Richland Airport (IATA: RLD, ICAO: KRLD, FAA LID: RLD) is a public airport in the northwest United States, located two miles (3 km) northwest of the central business district of Richland, a city in Benton County, Washington. It is owned by the Port of Benton.

== History ==
The airport, originally named Atomic Energy Field, was constructed in 1943 by the United States Atomic Energy Commission for use by personnel at the Hanford Site. The Port of Benton acquired the airport in December 1961, opening it for public use.

== Facilities and aircraft ==
Richland Airport covers an area of 564 acres (0.88 sq mi; 2.28 km^{2}) which contains two asphalt paved runways: 1/19 measuring 4,009 x 75 ft (1,222 x 23 m) and 8/26 measuring 3,995 x 100 ft (1,218 x 30 m).

For the 12-month period ending July 31, 2007, the airport had 29,000 general aviation aircraft operations, an average of 79 per day. There are 202 aircraft based at this airport: 87% single-engine, 2% multi-engine, 1% helicopter, 4% glider and 6% ultralight.

== Accidents ==
- 1978: Flight 23 of Richland-based Columbia Pacific Airlines, a Beechcraft 99 bound for Seattle, over-rotated and stalled on take-off from runway 36 (now runway 1) shortly before sunset on Friday, February 10, killing both pilots and all fifteen passengers.

== See also ==
- List of airports in Washington
