= Goheen Airport =

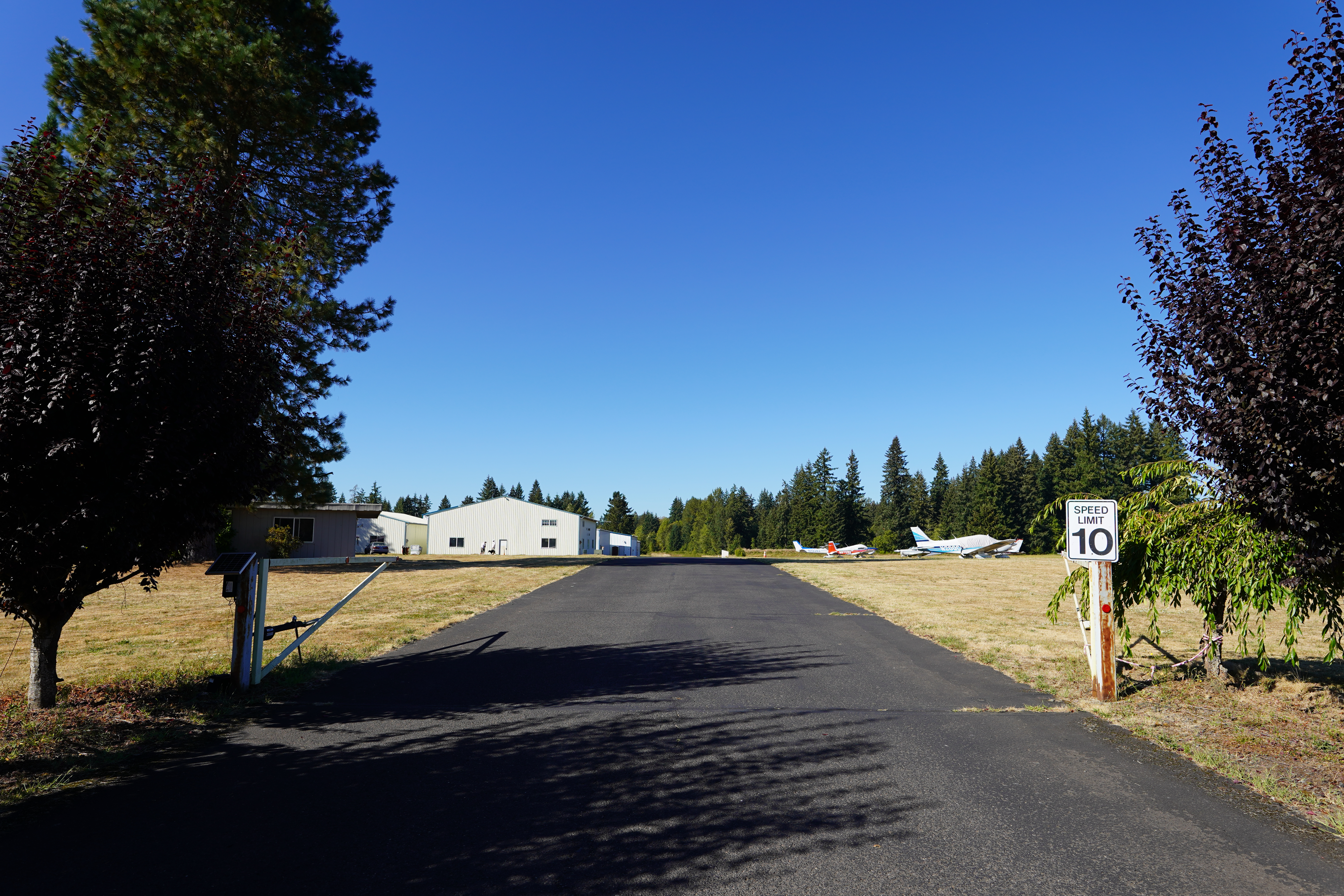
- IATA: none; ICAO: none; FAA LID: W52

Summary
- Airport type: Public use
- Owner: Gordon Goheen
- Serves: Battle Ground, Washington
- Elevation AMSL: 292 ft (89 m)
- Coordinates: 45°49′36″N 122°34′37″W

Map
- Location of airport in Washington W52 (the United States)

Runways
Direction	Length		Surface
Direction	ft	m	Surface
15/33	2,565	782	Turf
7/25	1,500	457	Turf

Statistics (2012)
- Aircraft operations: 3,440
- Based aircraft: 43
- Source: Federal Aviation Administration

Goheen Airport (FAA LID: W52) is a privately owned, public use airport located three nautical miles (6 km) northwest of the central business district of Battle Ground, a city in Clark County, Washington, United States.

== Facilities and aircraft ==
Goheen Airport covers an area of 100 acres (40 ha) at an elevation of 292 feet (89 m) above mean sea level. It has two runways with turf surfaces. Runway 15/33 is 2,565 by 50 feet (782 x 15 m); the approaches to both ends of this runway are visual; vertical guidance to Runway 15 is provided by visual approach slope indicators. Runway 7/25 is 1,500 by 48 feet (457 x 15 m); approaches to both ends of this runway are visual as well.

For the 12-month period ending July 30, 2012, the airport had 3,440 general aviation aircraft operations, an average of 286 per month. At that time there were 43 aircraft based at this airport: 81.4% single-engine, 14% multi-engine, 2.3% helicopter, and 2.3% ultralight.

== See also ==
- List of airports in Washington
