= Pierce County Airport =

Airport in South Hill, Washington, United States

- IATA: none; ICAO: KPLU; FAA LID: PLU

Summary
- Airport type: Public
- Owner: Pierce County, Washington
- Serves: Puyallup, Washington
- Location: South Hill, Washington
- Elevation AMSL: 538 ft (164 m)
- Coordinates: 47°06′14″N 122°17′14″W
- Website: www.co.pierce.wa.us/1633/Thun-Field-PLU
- Interactive map of Pierce County Airport

Runways
Direction	Length		Surface
Direction	ft	m	Surface
17/35	3,651	1,113	Asphalt

Statistics (2022)
- Aircraft operations: 107,000
- Based aircraft: 205
- Source: Federal Aviation Administration

Pierce County Airport, (ICAO: KPLU, FAA LID: PLU), also known as Thun Field after the founder, John Thun’s last name, is a county-owned public-use airport located 5 nautical miles (9.3 km; 5.8 mi) south of the central business district of Puyallup, Washington, a city in Pierce County, Washington, United States. It is located in the CDP South Hill, Washington. It is included in the Federal Aviation Administration (FAA) National Plan of Integrated Airport Systems for 2019–2023, in which it is categorized as a local general aviation facility. There is no commercial airline at this airport; the closest airport with commercial airline service is Seattle–Tacoma International Airport, about 24 miles (39 km) to the north.

Many U.S. airports use the same three-letter location identifier for the FAA and IATA. However, this airport is assigned PLU by the FAA but has no designation from the IATA.

== Facilities and aircraft ==
Pierce County Airport covers an area of 200 acres (81 ha) at an elevation of 538 feet (164 m) above mean sea level. It has one asphalt runway: 17/35 is 3,651 feet (1,113 m) by 60 feet (18 m) with runway edge lights and PAPIs on both ends.

In 2022, the airport had 107,000 aircraft operations, an average of 293 per day: 97% general aviation and 3% air taxi. In December 2022, there was 205 aircraft based at this airport: 194 single-engine, 9 multi-engine, and 2 helicopter.

== See also ==
- List of airports in Washington
