= Anderson Field (Washington) =

- IATA: none; ICAO: none; FAA LID: S97

Summary
- Airport type: Public
- Owner: Town of Brewster
- Serves: Brewster, Washington
- Elevation AMSL: 914 ft (279 m)
- Coordinates: 48°06′18″N 119°43′14″W
- Interactive map of Anderson Field

Runways
Direction	Length		Surface
Direction	ft	m	Surface
7/25	4,000	1,219	Asphalt

Statistics (2007)
- Aircraft operations: 20,000
- Source: Federal Aviation Administration

Anderson Field (FAA LID: S97) is a municipally owned, public-use airport located about 3.5 miles (around 6 km) east of the central business district of Brewster, a town in Okanogan County, Washington, United States.

== Facilities and aircraft ==
Anderson Field covers an area of 64 acres (26 ha) at an elevation of 914 feet (279 m) above mean sea level. It has one asphalt paved runway designated 7/25 which measures 4,000 by 60 feet (1,219 x 18 m). For the 12-month period ending December 30, 2012, the airport had 25,000 general aviation aircraft operations, an average of over 50 per day.

A fleet of Sikorsky S-58 helicopters is based at the airport. They are used to dry water off cherries after rainfall.

== See also ==
- List of airports in Washington
