= Almira, Washington =

Almira
- Town
- Almira, Washington
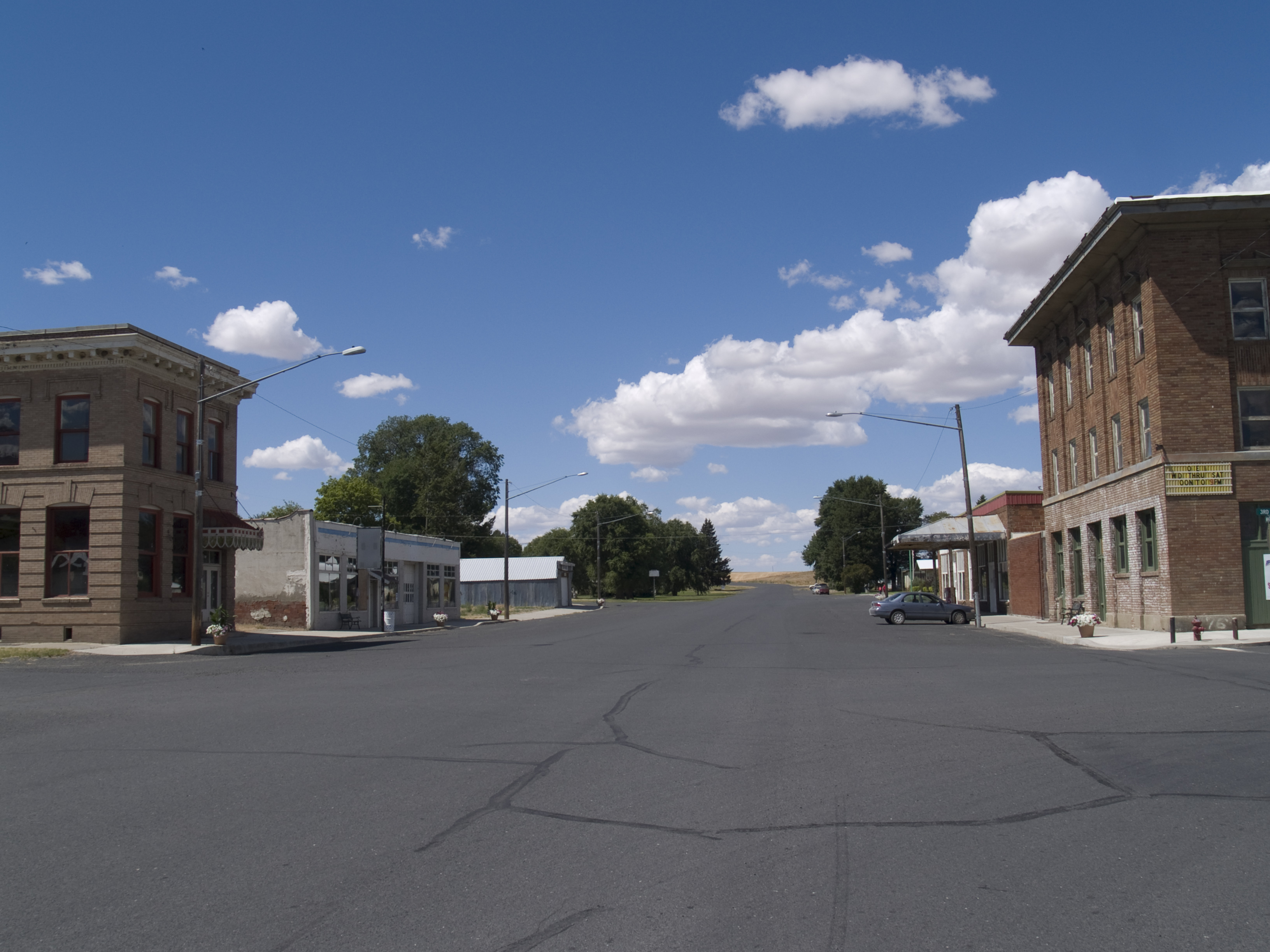
- Downtown Almira in 2008

- Location of Almira, Washington
- Coordinates: 47°42′38″N 118°56′30″W
- Country: United States
- State: Washington
- County: Lincoln

Government
  - Mayor: Jason Evers

Area
  - Total: 0.51 sq mi (1.33 km^{2})
  - Land: 0.51 sq mi (1.33 km^{2})
  - Water: 0 sq mi (0.00 km^{2})
- Elevation: 1,919 ft (585 m)

Population (2020)
  - Total: 318
  - Density: 619/sq mi (239/km^{2})
- Time zone: UTC-8 (Pacific (PST))
  - Summer (DST): UTC-7 (PDT)
- ZIP code: 99103
- Area code: 509
- FIPS code: 53-01500
- GNIS feature ID: 1503007
- Website: almirawa.gov

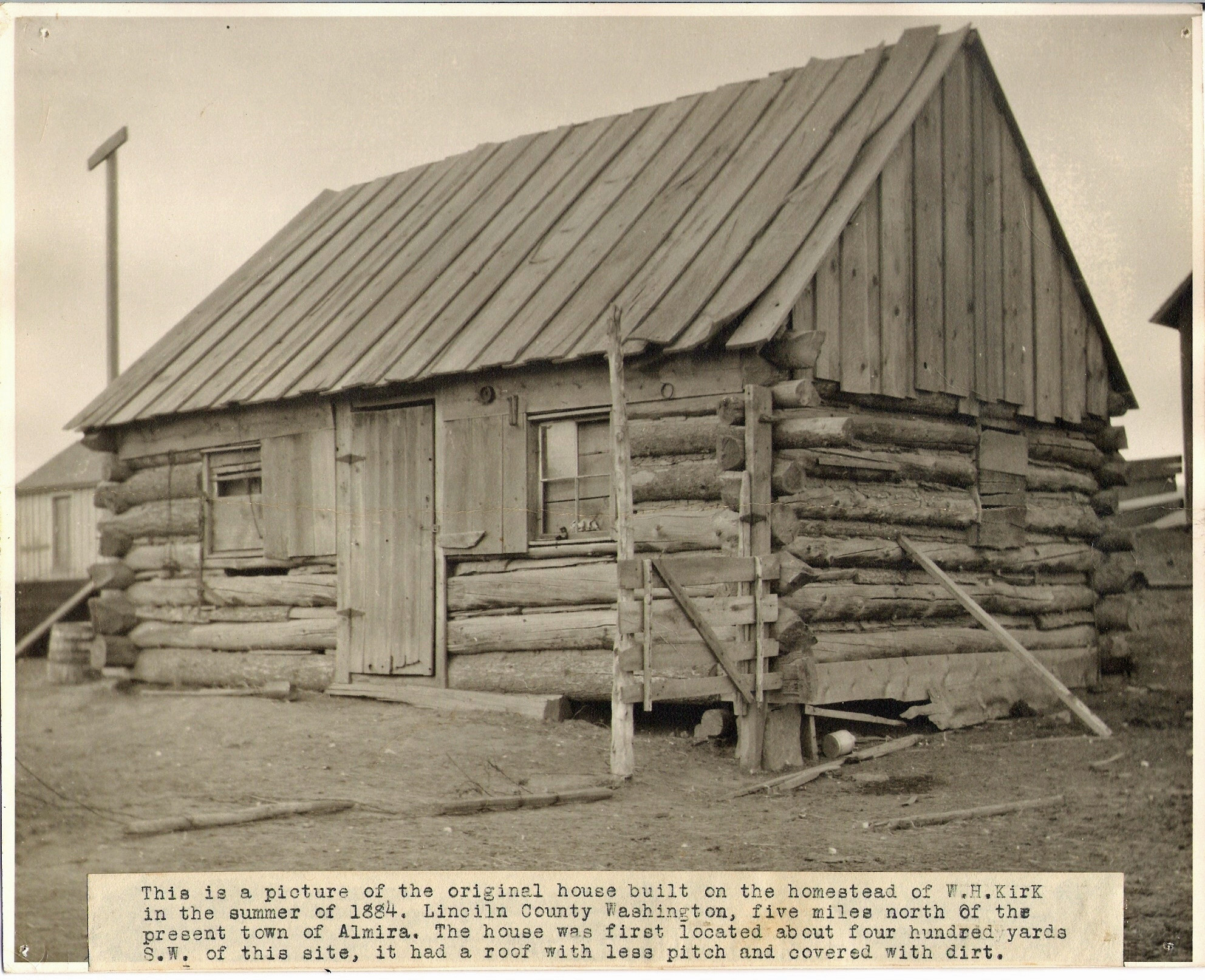

Almira (/ælˈmaɪrə/) is a town in Lincoln County, Washington, United States. The population was 318 at the 2020 census.

== History ==
The area that would become Almira was first settled in the 1880s by Charles C. Davis who purchased land and erected a small store to serve the few settlers living in the area. With the imminent construction of the Central Washington Railroad (later acquired by the Northern Pacific) through the area in 1889, Davis was approached by land developers Odgers and Reed who were looking to start a town on the site. Upon seeing Davis' wife's given name on the deed, the developers suggested christening the town under her name. Davis' farm and post office had previously been called "Davisine".

That place may make a town in the future. There is considerable vacant land for it to grow on. If you desire to learn of the 'glorious future' in store for the town. just confer with 'Tom' Hodges. the resident town-site agent. He never tires of reciting it. – Wilbur Register, July 26, 1889

With the railroad assured, Almira was platted and lots begin to sell quickly. Contractors and businessmen began to build temporary buildings for their stores. The railroad reached Almira in the Fall of 1889, where it would serve as the line's temporary terminus before being extended to Coulee City the following summer. Until the road was completed to the Grand Coulee Almira remained the terminus. All trains ran to this point, connections by stage being made to points westward. These factors made the town furiously active but a harsh winter prevented any building boom from taking place, leaving Almira as a collection of temporary shacks until the weather improved.

Despite the end of Almira as a rail terminal, it continued to thrive through 1890 with the establishment of a newspaper and the construction of many new buildings. The town's population was 156. In November 1890, Almira citizens voted for prohibition and the city temporarily became the only dry town in the Big Bend Country. After the Panic of 1893, growth in Almira like all across the country, came to a standstill. Most of the undeveloped lots in town were either in foreclosure or completely worthless. This changed in 1900 when the economy began to improve following several years of prosperous wheat harvests.

The next several years saw Almira grow from a temporary village to a more substantial city. In 1902, the city's population was 289 only counting citizens living on the platted town site.

Almira is still growing. If you don't believe it. come and see for yourself. During

the past twenty months activity in building has scarcely diminished at any one time. There has been no sudden impetus, no 'mushroom growth, in a single night, a day, or even six months, but there has been a steady increase. With the exception of a short period last winter, from one to six buildings have been in progress of construction during all seasons of the year.

– Big Bend Outlook (Almira), January 17, 1902

Almira was visited by fires twice in 1903. The first on March 21 destroyed several buildings including the office of the Almira News. The second fire in October started in the Almira Hotel and was much more destructive, destroying a whole block's worth of buildings. These blocks were rebuilt with more permanent brick buildings which still stand today.

Steps were taken towards incorporation in April 1903 but were initially unsuccessful because of disagreements in the town's incorporation boundaries. The second try was successful and Almira was officially incorporated on February 1, 1904.

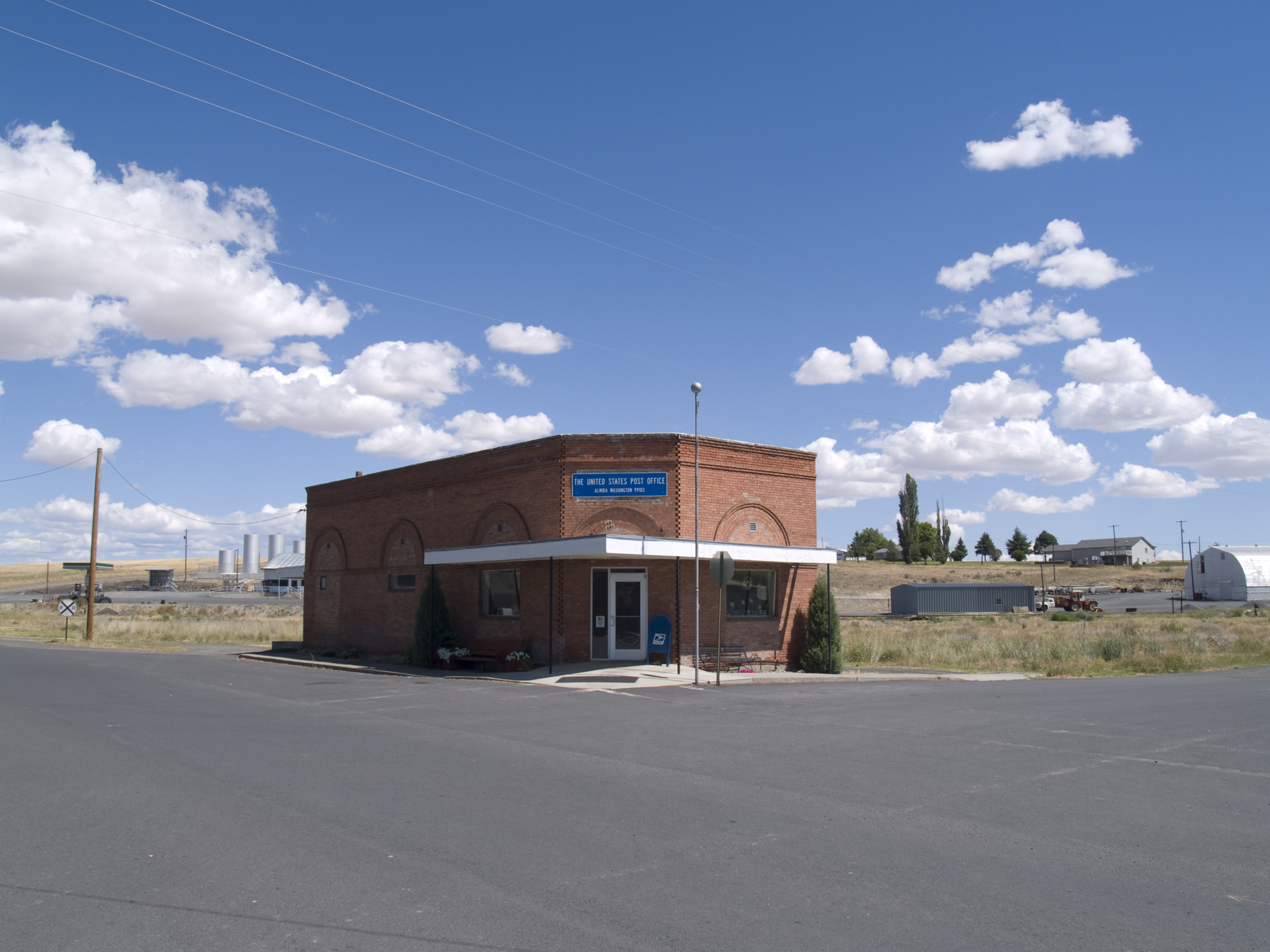
U.S. Post office in Almira, located in the town's first bank building.

== Geography ==
Almira is located at 47°42′38″N 118°56′30″W (47.710419, -118.941762).

According to the United States Census Bureau, the town has a total area of 0.52 square miles (1.35 km^{2}), all of it land.

== Demographics ==
Historical population
Census	Pop.	Note	%±
1910	368		—
1920	450		22.3%
1930	339		−24.7%
1940	466		37.5%
1950	395		−15.2%
1960	414		4.8%
1970	376		−9.2%
1980	330		−12.2%
1990	310		−6.1%
2000	302		−2.6%
2010	284		−6.0%
2020	318		12.0%
U.S. Decennial Census; 2020 Census

=== 2010 census ===
As of the 2010 census, there were 284 people, 119 households, and 84 families residing in the town. The population density was 546.2 inhabitants per square mile (210.9/km^{2}). There were 155 housing units at an average density of 298.1 units per square mile (115.1 units/km^{2}). The racial makeup of the town was 95.1% White, 0.7% Native American, 0.7% Asian, and 3.5% from two or more races. Hispanic or Latino of any race were 1.8% of the population.

There were 119 households, of which 24.4% had children under the age of 18 living with them, 56.3% were married couples living together, 8.4% had a female householder with no husband present, 5.9% had a male householder with no wife present, and 29.4% were non-families. 25.2% of all households were made up of individuals, and 18.4% had someone living alone who was 65 years of age or older. The average household size was 2.39 and the average family size was 2.83.

The median age in the town was 48.7 years. 20.8% of residents were under the age of 18; 8.1% were between the ages of 18 and 24; 17.2% were from 25 to 44; 29.3% were from 45 to 64; and 24.6% were 65 years of age or older. The gender makeup of the town was 51.4% male and 48.6% female.

=== 2000 census ===
As of the 2000 census, there were 302 people, 121 households, and 79 families residing in the town. The population density was 580.6 people per square mile (224.2 people/km^{2}). There were 154 housing units at an average density of 296.1 units per square mile (114.3 units/km^{2}). The racial makeup of the town was 93.38% White, 0.66% African American, 2.98% Native American, 1.66% Asian, and 1.32% from two or more races. Hispanic or Latino of any race were 1.32% of the population.

There were 121 households, out of which 33.1% had children under the age of 18 living with them, 55.4% were married couples living together, 6.6% had a female householder with no husband present, and 34.7% were non-families. 32.2% of all households were made up of individuals, and 15.7% had someone living alone who was 65 years of age or older. The average household size was 2.50 and the average family size was 3.18.

In the town, the population was spread out, with 29.5% under the age of 18, 6.0% from 18 to 24, 25.5% from 25 to 44, 22.5% from 45 to 64, and 16.6% who were 65 years of age or older. The median age was 38 years. For every 100 females, there were 92.4 males. For every 100 females age 18 and over, there were 91.9 males.

The median income for a household in the town was $30,208, and the median income for a family was $34,107. Males had a median income of $26,429 versus $36,563 for females. The per capita income for the town was $15,769. About 16.5% of families and 21.0% of the population were below the poverty line, including 29.9% of those under the age of eighteen and 12.8% of those sixty five or over.
