= Miles Vandahurst Lynk =

American physician and author

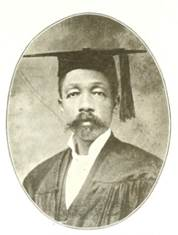
- Photograph of Miles V. Lynk published in 1919.
- Born: June 3, 1871; Brownsville, Tennessee, United States
- Died: December 29, 1956 (aged 85)
- Education: Meharry Medical College
- Spouse: Beebe Steven Lynk

Miles Vandahurst Lynk (June 3, 1871 – December 29, 1956) was an American physician and author noted for his efforts to create opportunities for African Americans in science, specifically for medical doctors. He was known both as the founder, editor and publisher of Medical and Surgical Observer (the first medical journal issued by an African American), as well as founding the University of West Tennessee College of Medicine and Surgery.

== Personal life ==
Lynk was born near Brownsville, Tennessee. He was named after two bishops, William Henry Miles and Richard H. Vandahurst, of the Christian Methodist Episcopal church in Jackson, Tennessee. Lynk attended Meharry Medical College for two years and graduated in 1891. Later that year, aged 19, he opened his own practice becoming Jackson's first black doctor. On April 12, 1893, Lynk married Beebe Steven Lynk, one of the first African-American women chemists and chemistry teachers. Lynk died December 29, 1956, aged 85.

== Career and philanthropy ==
Lynk spent much time developing educational and professional opportunities for African American physicians. In 1890 he and his wife, Beebe Steven Lynk, established the University of West Tennessee graduating at least 155 physicians as well as a number of pharmacists, nurses, dentists, and, through its law school, attorneys during its twenty-three years of existence. They took out a loan with their own home so they could purchase land for the college. Lynk was able to provide for African Americans who could not afford to go to school, and bring up the preparation that went in to going to medical school. During his time as president of the medical department of the University of West Tennessee he contributed to the founding of the National Medical Association. Lynk received the Distinguished Service medal of the National Medical Association at their 57th annual convention.

In 1892, Lynk published the first national medical journal published for African-American practitioners. The Medical and Surgical Observer was stamped and labeled by the Library of the Surgeon General's Office in Washington, D.C., as the "Only Negro M.J. in America." The journal connected the isolated African-American medical practitioners across the United States. Although the MSO was published for only about a year, it served as a forum for black medical professionals, who were typically not welcomed in white society and medical conversations at the time. Its content informed African-American physicians of news and practical ideas throughout the world of medicine that they had not been informed of in the past. Since the journal existed during a time of racial segregation, its readers found this was another way to find information in order to compete with white medical practitioners.

== Works ==
Lynk also published several books on African-American history, including The Black Troopers, or the Daring Heroism of the Negro Soldiers in the Spanish–American War. It discusses the lives of African-American soldiers during the war. The first half of the book strictly explored the lives of black soldiers. Lynk delved into the wealth of inequality they experienced, the impact of being drafted, and what that had on the soldier's family, and the tribulations of being a soldier. The second half of the book examined the soldiers who volunteered in the Army to serve their country regardless of the racial tension and inequality.
