= Center Island (Washington) =

Island of the San Juan Islands in northwest Washington, United States

- Interactive map of Center Island

Geography
- Location: Pacific Northwest
- Coordinates: 48.4900°N 122.8309°W
- Archipelago: San Juan Islands
- Area: 0.27 sq mi (0.70 km^{2})

Administration
- United States
- State: Washington
- County: San Juan County

Demographics
- Population: 49 (2000)

Center Island is one of the San Juan Islands in San Juan County, Washington, United States. It lies off the eastern shore of Lopez Island, between it and Decatur Island. Center Island has a land area of 0.713 km^{2} (0.275 sq mi; 176 acres). The population was officially 49 persons as of the 2000 census.

== Transportation ==
The island is served by the Center Island Airport (IATA: CWS, FAA LID: 78WA).
