= Martha Lake, Washington =

- CDP
- Location of Martha Lake, Washington
- Coordinates: 47°51′3″N 122°14′21″W
- Country: United States
- State: Washington
- County: Snohomish

Area
  - Total: 4.7 sq mi (12.2 km^{2})
  - Land: 4.6 sq mi (11.9 km^{2})
  - Water: 0.077 sq mi (0.2 km^{2})
- Elevation: 469 ft (143 m)

Population (2020)
  - Total: 21,129
  - Density: 4,599/sq mi (1,775.5/km^{2})
- Time zone: UTC-8 (Pacific (PST))
  - Summer (DST): UTC-7 (PDT)
- FIPS code: 53-43815
- GNIS feature ID: 1867620

Martha Lake is a census-designated place (CDP) in Snohomish County, Washington, United States. The population was 21,129 at the 2020 census. It lies west of Mill Creek and northeast of Lynnwood, near the lake of the same name.

Based on per capita income, Martha Lake ranks 95th of 522 areas in the state of Washington to be ranked.

== Geography ==
Martha Lake is located at 47°51′3″N 122°14′21″W (47.850802, -122.239296).

According to the United States Census Bureau, the CDP has a total area of 4.7 square miles (12.2 km^{2}), of which, 4.6 square miles (11.9 km^{2}) of it is land and 0.1 square miles (0.2 km^{2}) of it (1.65%) is water.

== Demographics ==
Historical population
Census	Pop.	Note	%±
1980	7,022		—
1990	10,155		44.6%
2000	12,633		24.4%
2020	21,660		—
U.S. Decennial Census; 1970 1980 1990; 2000 2010

Martha Lake first appeared as a census designated place in the 1980 U.S. census.

=== 2020 census ===
As of the 2020 census, Martha Lake had a population of 21,660. The median age was 34.8 years. 23.8% of residents were under the age of 18 and 10.7% of residents were 65 years of age or older. For every 100 females there were 98.1 males, and for every 100 females age 18 and over there were 97.5 males age 18 and over.

100.0% of residents lived in urban areas, while 0.0% lived in rural areas.

There were 7,705 households in Martha Lake, of which 36.7% had children under the age of 18 living in them. Of all households, 54.6% were married-couple households, 16.0% were households with a male householder and no spouse or partner present, and 20.9% were households with a female householder and no spouse or partner present. About 18.8% of all households were made up of individuals and 4.8% had someone living alone who was 65 years of age or older.

There were 7,940 housing units, of which 3.0% were vacant. The homeowner vacancy rate was 0.6% and the rental vacancy rate was 4.3%.

Racial composition as of the 2020 census
Race	Number	Percent
White	11,955	55.2%
Black or African American	936	4.3%
American Indian and Alaska Native	131	0.6%
Asian	4,421	20.4%
Native Hawaiian and Other Pacific Islander	174	0.8%
Some other race	1,403	6.5%
Two or more races	2,640	12.2%

=== 2000 census ===
As of the census of 2000, there were 12,633 people, 4,602 households, and 3,419 families residing in the CDP. The population density was 2,654.0 people per square mile (1,024.7/km^{2}). There were 4,808 housing units at an average density of 1,010.1/sq mi (390.0/km^{2}). The racial makeup of the CDP was 58.80% White, 11.52% African American, 0.79% Native American, 12.63% Asian, 0.23% Pacific Islander, 1.30% from other races, and 3.74% from two or more races. Hispanic or Latino of any race were 19.70% of the population.

There were 4,602 households, out of which 38.2% had children under the age of 18 living with them, 60.3% were married couples living together, 9.6% had a female householder with no husband present, and 25.7% were non-families. 17.6% of all households were made up of individuals, and 3.2% had someone living alone who was 65 years of age or older. The average household size was 2.74 and the average family size was 3.10.

In the CDP, the age distribution of the population shows 27.0% under the age of 18, 8.9% from 18 to 24, 34.9% from 25 to 44, 22.6% from 45 to 64, and 6.6% who were 65 years of age or older. The median age was 34 years. For every 100 females, there were 99.4 males. For every 100 females age 18 and over, there were 98.3 males.

The median income for a household in the CDP was $57,568, and the median income for a family was $59,813. Males had a median income of $46,262 versus $32,356 for females. The per capita income for the CDP was $24,721. About 2.9% of families and 4.9% of the population were below the poverty line, including 5.4% of those under age 18 and 4.9% of those age 65 or over.

== Education ==
Portions of the community lie in the Edmonds School District, the Mukilteo School District, and the Everett School District.
