= Quincy Municipal Airport (Florida) =

Airport in Florida, U.S.

Coordinates: 30°35′52.30″N 084°33′26.70″W

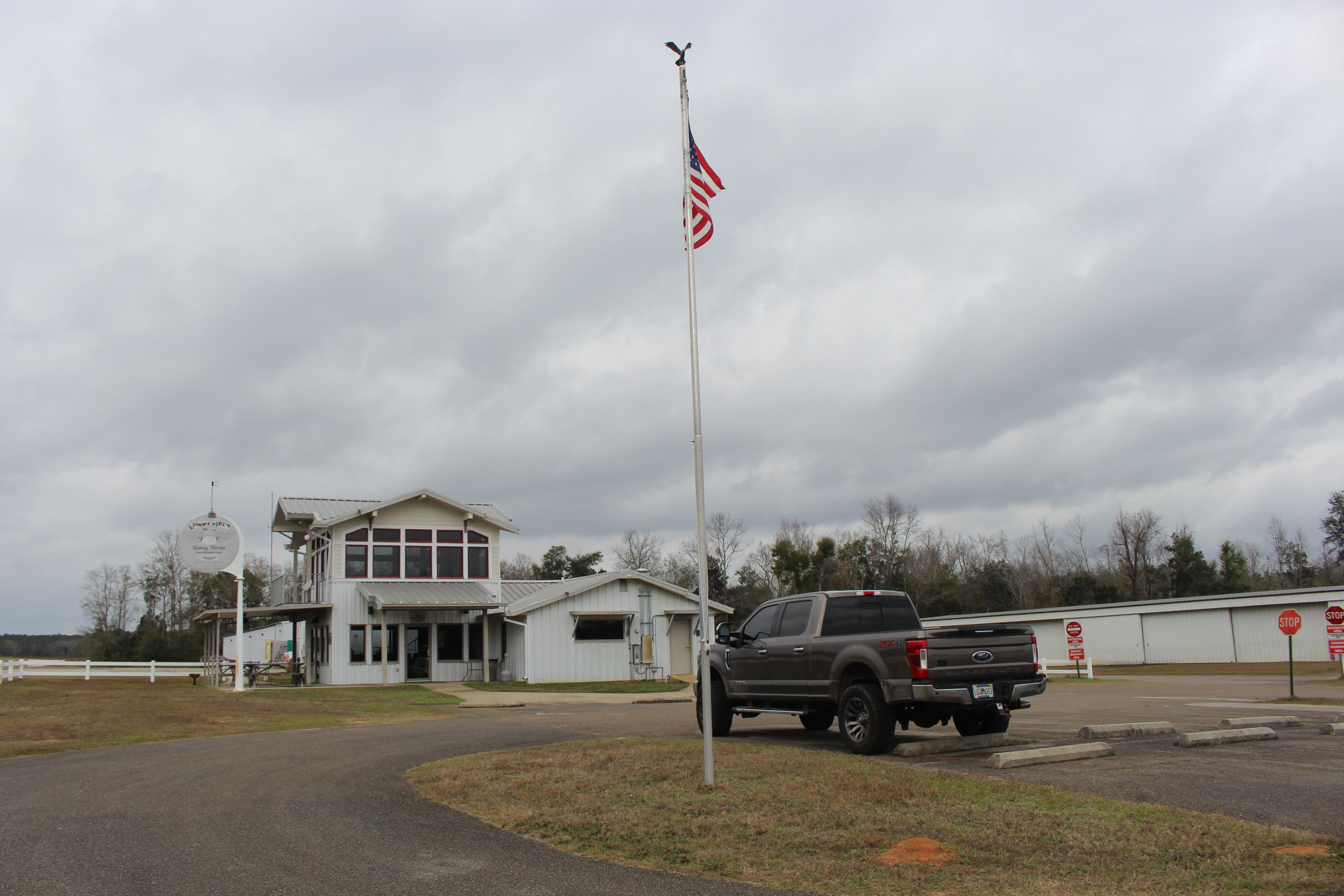
- IATA: none; ICAO: none; FAA LID: 2J9

Summary
- Airport type: Public use
- Owner: Quincy-Gadsden Airport Authority
- Operator: Quincy-Gadsden Airport Authority
- Serves: Quincy, Florida
- Location: Gadsden County, Florida
- Elevation AMSL: 221 ft / 67 m
- Interactive map of Quincy Municipal Airport

Runways
Direction	Length		Surface
Direction	ft	m	Surface
14/32	2,964	903	Asphalt

Statistics (1999)
- Aircraft operations: 5,247
- Based aircraft: 63
- Source: Federal Aviation Administration

The Quincy Municipal Airport (FAA LID: 2J9) is a public-use airport located 2 miles (3.2 km) northeast of the central business district of the city of Quincy in Gadsden County, Florida, United States. The airport is publicly owned. The nearest airline service and jet fuel is 20 miles (32 km) away at Tallahassee International Airport (KTLH). The airport appears on the western edge of the Jacksonville VFR sectional. Taxi service is limited to none at all.

== Runways and facilities ==
The Quincy Airport does have a single 2,964' X 75', paved, lighted runway. Runway 14/32 has low intensity edge lighting. Both ends of the runway have displaced thresholds for landing. Full length of the paved surface is available for takeoff in both directions. There are no paved taxiways. The airport has a grass landing area which has existed since 1932.

Runway 14: Runway heading- 137 magnetic, 136 true Displaced threshold: approx 150 ft.

Runway 32: Runway heading- 317 magnetic, 316 true; Displaced threshold: 324 ft.

There is a lighted windsock and a rotating beacon near the FBO building on the east side of the runway. 100LL avgas is available at the FBO. Maintenance is available on the field. The turf area on the east side of/and parallel to the paved runway is an unofficial turf runway and taxi area. This area is used by ultralights, gliders, skydivers, homebuilt aircraft, helicopters and occasionally regular aircraft during normal operations. There is a VOR approach off the Seminole (SZW) VOR near Tallahassee and a GPS approach which aren't available.

Since 1994 the airport has been home to The School of Human Flight (also known as "Skydive Tallahassee") - the only USPA Member dropzone in the Florida panhandle. parachute operations take place at the airport, with several jumps made annually. Usually weekends only.

== Airport governance ==
The airport is now an independently chartered entity which is run by the Quincy-Gadsden Airport Authority. The authority has five volunteer members, two appointed by the city, two by the county and one person who is appointed by board.

== See also ==
- List of airports in Florida
