= Quincy Municipal Airport (Washington) =

- IATA: none; ICAO: none; FAA LID: 80T

Summary
- Airport type: Public
- Owner: City of Quincy
- Serves: Quincy, Washington
- Elevation AMSL: 1,271 ft / 387 m
- Coordinates: 47°12′42″N 119°50′23″W

Map
- Location of airport in Washington 80T (the United States)

Runways
Direction	Length		Surface
Direction	ft	m	Surface
9/27	3,660	1,116	Asphalt

Statistics (2010)
- Aircraft operations: 3,800
- Based aircraft: 6
- Source: Federal Aviation Administration

Quincy Municipal Airport (FAA LID: 80T) is a city-owned, public-use airport located two nautical miles (4 km) southeast of the central business district of Quincy, a city in Grant County, Washington, United States.

== Facilities and aircraft ==
Quincy Municipal Airport covers an area of 38 acres (15 ha) at an elevation of 1,271 feet (387 m) above mean sea level. It has one runway designated 9/27 with an asphalt surface measuring 3,660 by 50 feet (1,116 x 15 m).

For the 12-month period ending June 28, 2010, the airport had 3,800 general aviation aircraft operations, an average of 10 per day. At that time there were six single-engine aircraft based at this airport.

== See also ==
- List of airports in Washington
