= Kenmore Air Harbor =

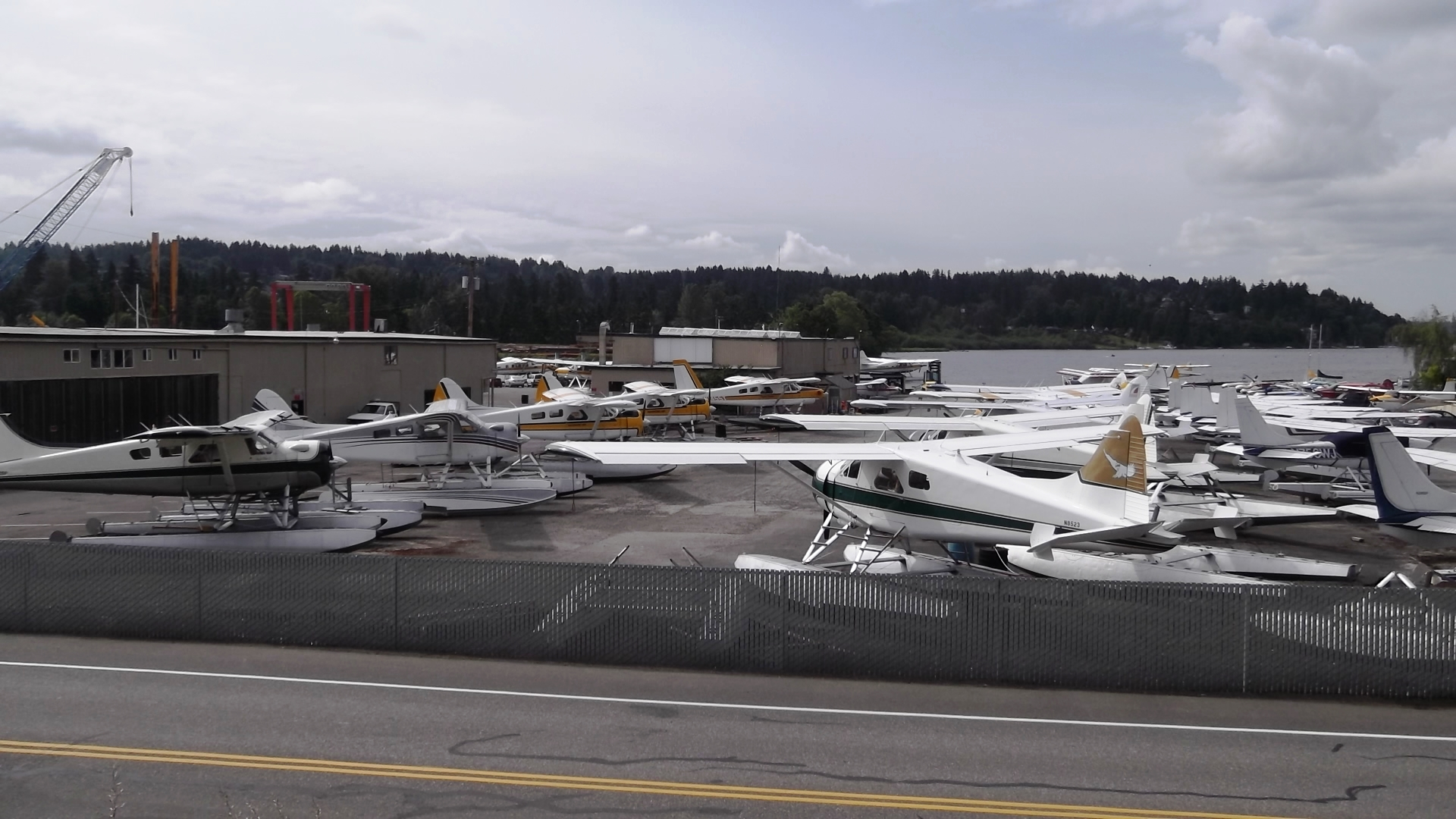
- IATA: KEH; ICAO: none; FAA LID: S60

Summary
- Airport type: Public
- Owner: Green Hornet Enterprises and Munro Banks Holdco
- Serves: Kenmore, Washington
- Location: Lake Washington
- Elevation AMSL: 14 ft (4.3 m)
- Coordinates: 47°45′17″N 122°15′33″W
- Website: www.kenmoreairharbor.com

Map
- Location within Washington (state) Location within the United States

Runways
Direction	Length		Surface
Direction	ft	m	Surface
16/34	10,000	3,048	Water
18/36	3,000	914	Water

Statistics (2019)
- Aircraft operations: 43,000
- Based aircraft: 25
- Source: FAA, WSDOT

Kenmore Air Harbor (IATA: KEH, FAA LID: S60) is a public-use seaplane base at the northern end of Lake Washington and 1 nmi (1.9 km; 1.2 mi) south of the central business district of Kenmore, Washington, U.S. It primarily serves western Washington and parts of southwestern British Columbia. The base is primarily used by regional seaplane airline Kenmore Air.

== Facilities and aircraft ==
Kenmore Air Harbor covers an area of 5 acres (2.0 ha) at an elevation of 14 feet (4 m) above mean sea level. It has two seaplane landing areas: 16/34 is 10,000 by 1,000 feet (3,048 x 305 m) and 18/36 is 3,000 by 1,000 feet (914 x 305 m).

For the 12-month period ending December 31, 2022, the airport had 43,000 aircraft operations, an average of 118 per day: 81% air taxi and 18% general aviation. At that time there were 26 single-engine aircraft based at this airport.

== Airlines and destinations ==
=== Passenger ===
Airlines	Destinations
Kenmore Air	Victoria-Inner Harbour; Seasonal: Friday Harbor, Roche Harbor, Lopez Island, Deer Harbor, Eastsound-Rosario, West Sound, Nanaimo–Harbour, Quadra Island–April Point Resort, Bliss Landing, Refuge Cove, Cortes Island–Cortes Bay/Government Dock, Cortes Island–Gorge Harbour, Desolation Sound–Prideaux Haven, Princess Louisa Inlet–Chatterbox Falls, Princess Louisa Inlet–Malibu Club, Stuart Island–Nanook Lodge, Sonora Island, Dent Island–Dent Island Lodge, Fisherman's Landing, Mink Island, Toba Inlet, Garden Bay–Pender Harbour/Fisherman's Resort

== In the arts ==
Kenmore Air Harbor is the base for the "San Juan Island Run" mission supplied with Microsoft Flight Simulator X. The seaplane base was also the site of the final task for The Amazing Race 35.

== See also ==
- List of airports in Washington
