= DHB =

DHB may refer to:

- 2,5-Dihydroxy benzoic acid
- District health board, New Zealand
- Deer Harbor Sea Plane Base (IATA airport code), Washington, US
- German Handball Association (Deutscher Handballbund)
- German Hockey Federation (Deutscher Hockey-Bund)
