= KEH =

KEH may refer to:

- KEH, the IATA code for Kenmore Air Harbor, a public-use seaplane base in Lake Washington, United States
- KEH, the National Rail code for Keith railway station, Moray, Scotland
