= Kenmore Air Harbor Seaplane Base =

Kenmore Air Harbor Seaplane Base Seattle Lake Union Seaplane Base
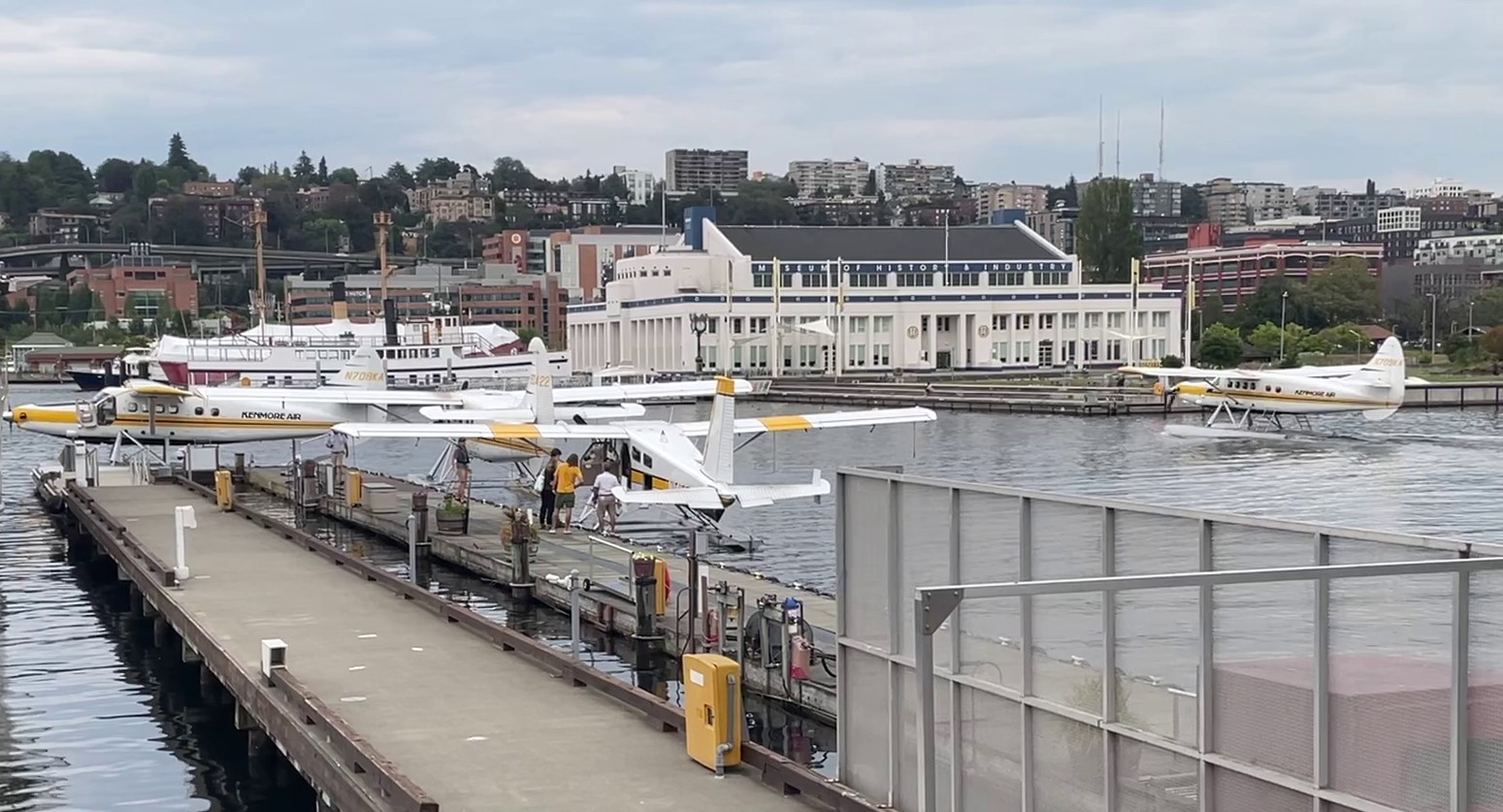
- Kenmore Air Harbor Seaplane Base loading area
- IATA: LKE; ICAO: none; FAA LID: W55

Summary
- Airport type: Public
- Owner: Green Hornet Enterprises and Munro Banks Holdco
- Serves: Seattle, Washington
- Location: Lake Union
- Elevation AMSL: 14 ft (4.3 m)
- Coordinates: 47°37′44″N 122°20′19″W
- Website: www.KenmoreAir.com

Map
- Location within Washington (state) Location within the United States

Runways
Direction	Length		Surface
Direction	ft	m	Surface
16/34	5,000	1,524	Water

Statistics (2007)
- Aircraft operations: 35,500
- Sources: FAA, WSDOT

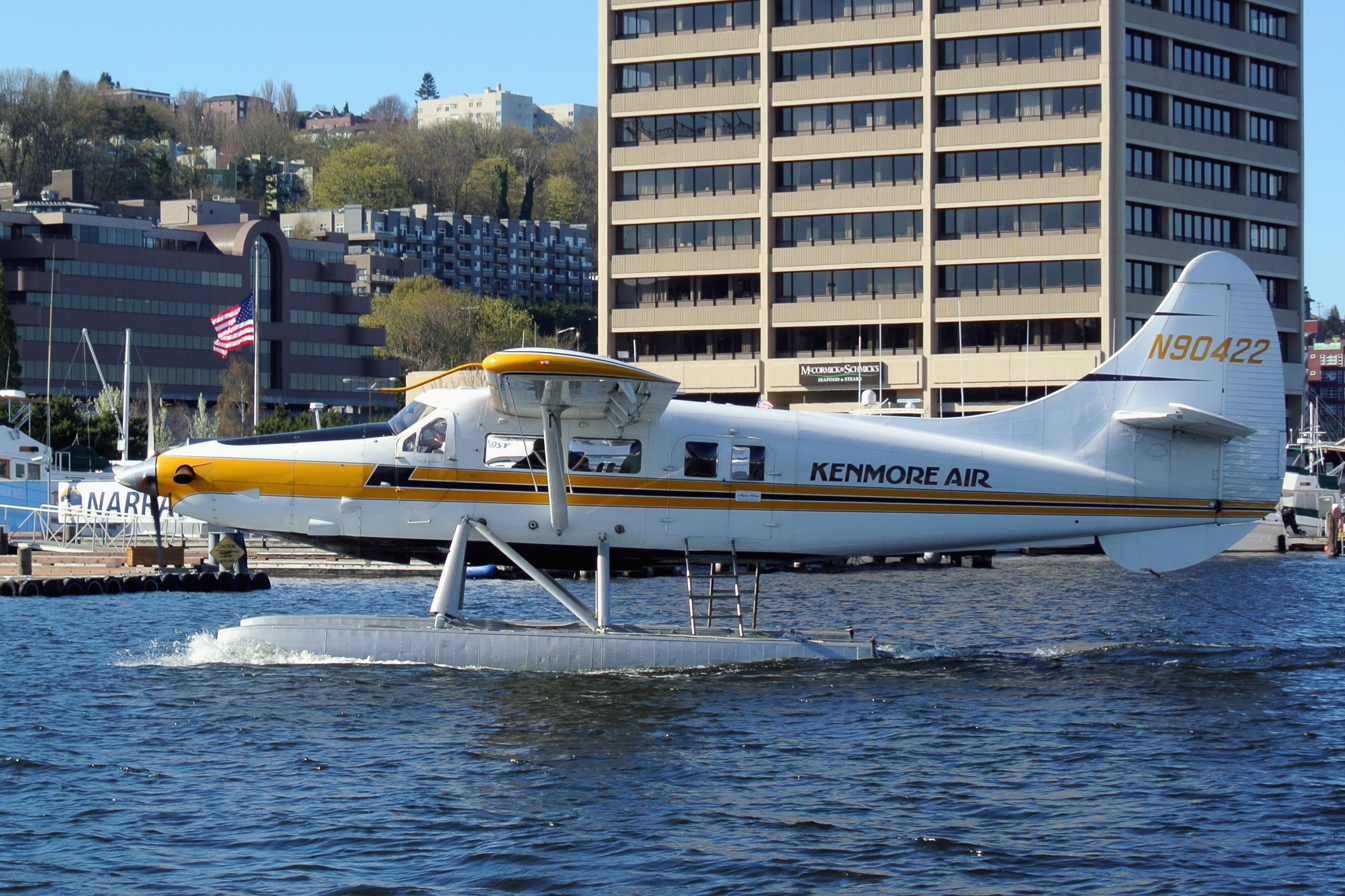
Kenmore Air DHC-3 Otter on Lake Union

Kenmore Air Harbor Seaplane Base, or Seattle Lake Union Seaplane Base, (IATA: LKE, FAA LID: W55) is a seaplane base and international airport on Lake Union, Washington, U.S., 1 nautical mile (1.9 km; 1.2 mi) north of Downtown Seattle.

== Facilities and aircraft ==
Kenmore Air Harbor Seaplane Base is 3 acres (1.2 ha) at an elevation of 14 feet (4.3 m) above mean sea level. It has one 5,000-by-500-foot (1,520 by 150 m) seaplane landing area designated runway 16/34, which runs from Gas Works Park to the north to Lake Union Park in the south. A different seaplane base on the same lake, Seattle Seaplanes SPB (FAA LID: 0W0), is assigned runway 18/36 that instead goes diagonally through the lake.

For the 12 months ending December 31, 2022, the airport had 43,500 aircraft operations, an average of 119 per day: 82% air taxi and 18% general aviation.

== Airlines and destinations ==
=== Passenger ===
Airlines	Destinations
Harbour Air	Seasonal: Vancouver Harbour, Victoria Harbour
Kenmore Air	Victoria-Inner Harbour; Seasonal: Friday Harbor, Roche Harbor, Lopez Island, Deer Harbor, Eastsound-Rosario, West Sound, Nanaimo–Harbour, Quadra Island–April Point Resort, Bliss Landing, Refuge Cove, Cortes Island–Cortes Bay/Government Dock, Cortes Island–Gorge Harbour, Desolation Sound–Prideaux Haven, Princess Louisa Inlet–Chatterbox Falls, Princess Louisa Inlet–Malibu Club, Stuart Island–Nanook Lodge, Sonora Island, Dent Island–Dent Island Lodge, Fisherman's Landing, Mink Island, Toba Inlet, Garden Bay–Pender Harbour/Fisherman's Resort

== History ==
The first seaplane flight from Lake Union was by William E. Boeing, on June 15, 1916. The lake has been served by commercial flights from Kenmore Air since 1946. In 2018, buoys and lights were installed in the lake to advise boaters of landing planes. Despite the advisory buoys, recreational watergoers have continued to use the public lake, leading to cancelled flights.

== See also ==
- List of airports in Washington
