= Flute Quest =

Festival celebrating the Native American flute

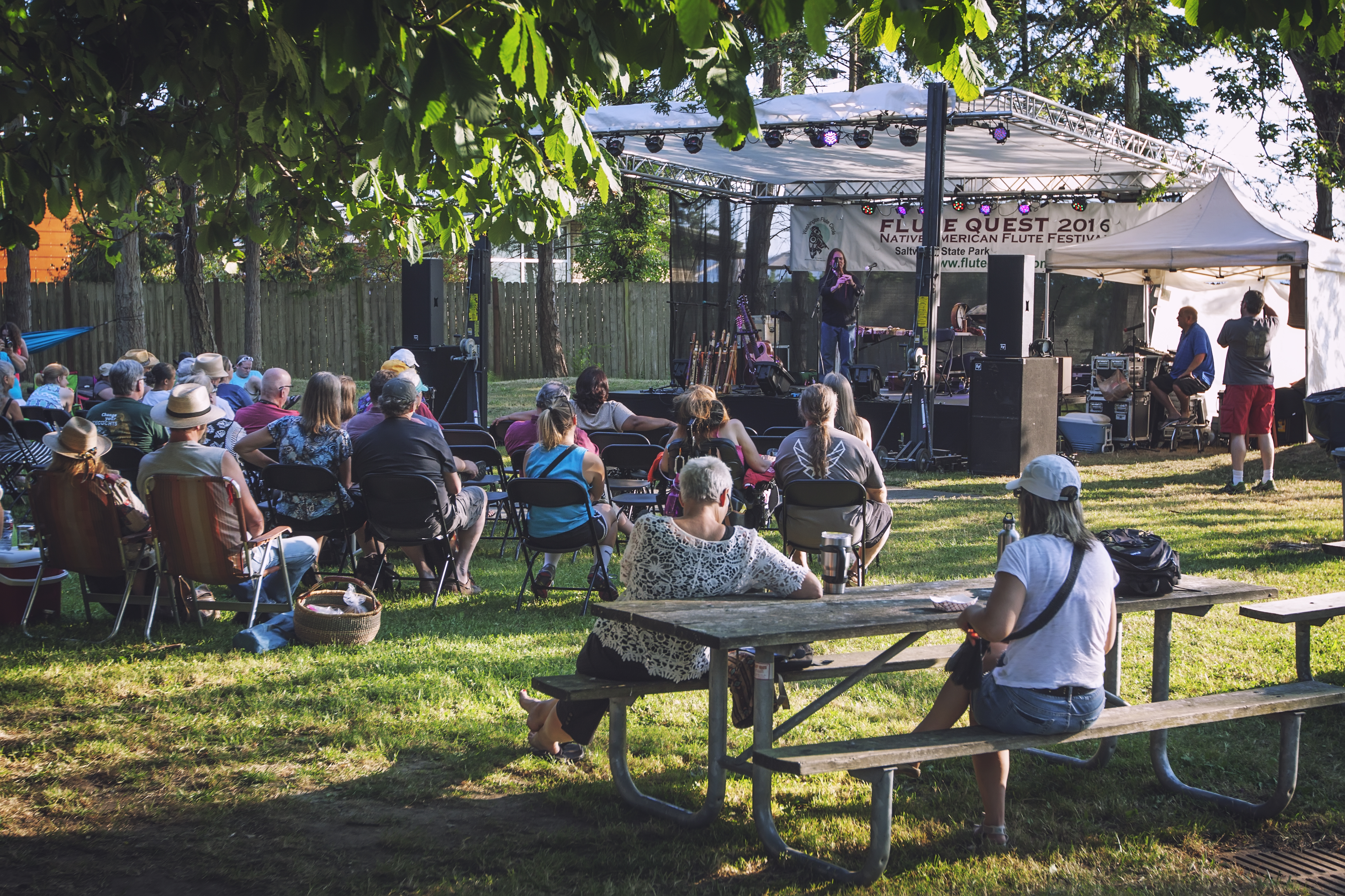
Flute Quest 2016

Flute Quest is an annual Pacific Northwest festival celebrating the Native American flute. Flute Quest features the New Breath stage featuring local and out of town performers, workshops, vendors, and musical jam sessions related to the playing and making of the Native American flute, Native American culture, and other indigenous instruments.

== Origin ==
Flute Quest was first conceived by Brent Haines of Woodsounds Flutes late in 2004 who was inspired after attending the Musical Echoes flute festival in Florida. The Washington Flute Circle was organized at that time in order to organize and promote Flute Quest and be a parent organization for flute circles in Washington state. The festival was conceived as a Pacific Northwest version of Musical Echoes in Florida or the Potomac Flute Festival in Virginia.

== History ==
The first Flute Quest was held in 2006 at St. Edward State Park in nearby Kenmore. Flute Quest initially garnered start-up support in the form of a public grant from 4Culture, the cultural outreach arm of King County. In their first year they hosted several national and international Native American flute performing artists, including Robert Mirabal and Mary Youngblood.

In September 2006, the inaugural Flute Quest was held at Saint Edward State Park. In August 2007 and September 2008, Flute Quest was hosted by Country Village in Bothell, Washington. From 2009 to 2015, Flute Quest has been held at Saltwater State Park in Des Moines, Washington.
