= W49 (disambiguation) =

The W49 was an American thermonuclear warhead.

W49 may also refer to:

- Nisshin Station (Hokkaido), Japan
- Rosario Seaplane Base, on Orcas Island, Washington, United States
- Westerhout 49, a galactic H II region
