= Friday Harbor Seaplane Base =

- IATA: FBS; ICAO: none; FAA LID: W33

Summary
- Airport type: Public
- Owner: Port of Friday Harbor
- Serves: Friday Harbor, Washington
- Elevation AMSL: 0 ft (0 m)
- Coordinates: 48°32′14″N 123°00′35″W

Map
- Location within Washington (state) Location within the United States

Runways
Direction	Length		Surface
Direction	ft	m	Surface
3/21	10,000	3,048	Water
12/30	6,000	1,829	Water

Statistics (2009)
- Aircraft operations: 8,600
- Source: Federal Aviation Administration

Friday Harbor Seaplane Base (IATA: FBS, FAA LID: W33) is a public use seaplane base located adjacent to Friday Harbor, on San Juan Island in San Juan County, Washington, United States. It is owned by the Port of Friday Harbor.

== Facilities and aircraft ==
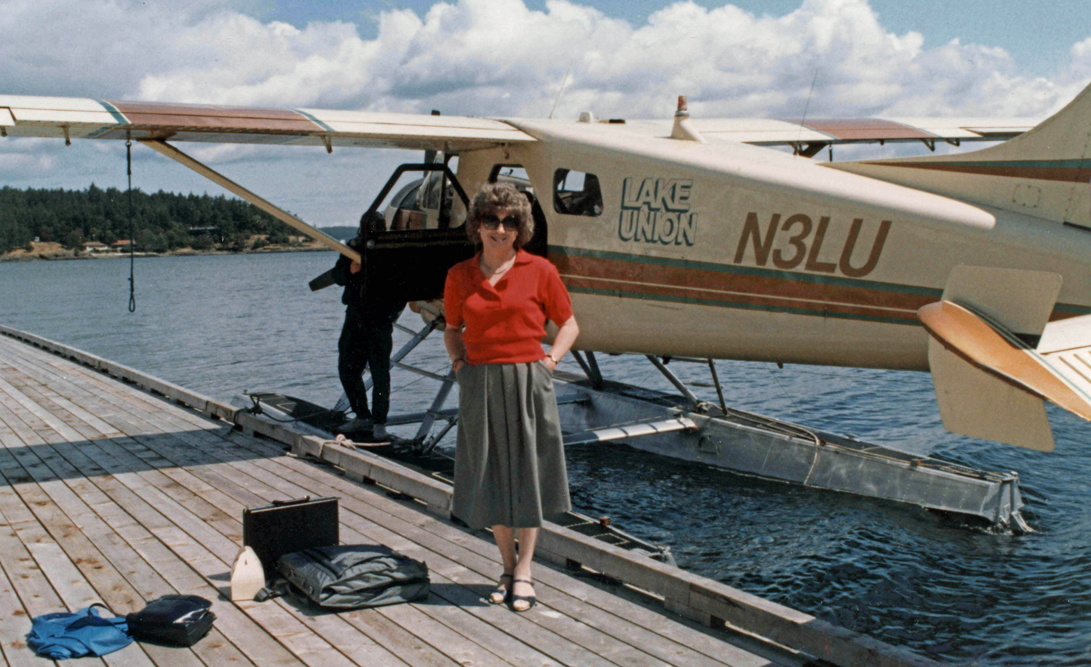
de Havilland Canada DHC-2 Beaver floatplane at Friday Harbor Seaplane Base on arrival from Seattle Lake Union

Friday Harbor Seaplane Base has two seaplane landing areas: 3/21 is 10,000 by 2,000 feet (3,048 x 610 m) and 12/30 is 6,000 by 1,000 feet (1,829 x 305 m).

For the 12-month period ending May 31, 2009, the airport had 8,600 aircraft operations, an average of 23 per day: 53.5% were air taxi flights and 46.5% general aviation.

== Airlines and destinations ==
Airlines	Destinations
Kenmore Air	Roche Harbor, Seattle–Lake Union

== See also ==
- List of airports in Washington
