= Kenmore, Washington =

City of Kenmore ƛ̕ax̌ʷadis
- City
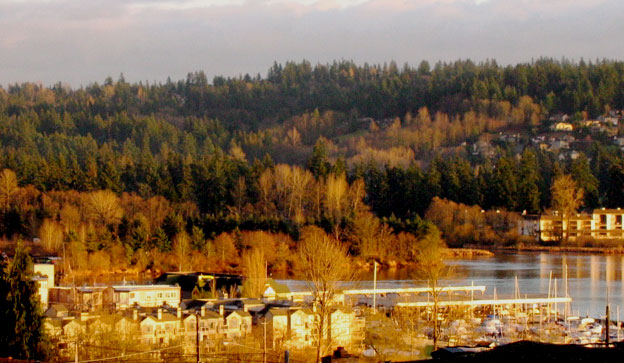

- Seal
- Interactive map of City of Kenmore
- Coordinates: 47°45′10″N 122°14′50″W
- Country: United States
- State: Washington
- County: King
- Incorporated: August 31, 1998

Government
  - Type: Council–manager
  - Mayor: Nigel Herbig

Area
  - Total: 7.22 sq mi (18.69 km^{2})
  - Land: 6.15 sq mi (15.92 km^{2})
  - Water: 1.07 sq mi (2.77 km^{2})
- Elevation: 39 ft (12 m)

Population (2020)
  - Total: 23,914
  - Density: 3,757/sq mi (1,450.4/km^{2})
- Time zone: UTC-8 (PST)
  - Summer (DST): UTC-7 (PDT)
- ZIP code: 98028
- Area code: 425
- FIPS code: 53-35170
- GNIS feature ID: 2410181
- Website: kenmorewa.gov

Kenmore (Lushootseed: ƛ̕ax̌ʷadis) is a city in King County, Washington, United States, along the northernmost shore of Lake Washington. It is a suburban commuter town at the mouth of the Sammamish River, 12 miles (19 km) northeast of downtown Seattle and 2 miles (3.2 km) west of Bothell. The population was 23,914 at the 2020 census. Kenmore Air Harbor is the largest seaplane-only passenger facility of its kind in the United States.

Kenmore is connected to nearby areas by State Route 522 and the Burke-Gilman Trail, which both run east–west along the lakeshore. The city limits stretch north to the Snohomish County line and south to a border with Kirkland south of Saint Edward State Park and Bastyr University.

== History ==
The Sammamish River valley from Lake Washington to Issaquah Creek was historically inhabited by the indigenous Sammamish people (also known as the "s-tah-PAHBSH", or "willow people"), a Coast Salish group with an estimated population of 80 to 200 by 1850. Among them were the "ssts'p-abc" ("meander dwellers"), who settled near the river's mouth at two villages—the larger of which was "tlah-WAH-dees" between modern-day Kenmore and Bothell. The Sammamish were removed from their lands in 1856 following the Puget Sound War and moved to the Port Madison and Tulalip Indian reservations. The forested land that would become Kenmore was then owned by Philo Remington of E. Remington and Sons, who subsequently sold it to son-in-law Watson C. Squire, a former governor of the Washington Territory.

=== Early 20th century ===
Scotsman John McMasters and his wife Annie arrived in Puget Sound in May 1889 from Kenmore, Ontario, intending to establish themselves in the shingle-making trade. McMasters and his business partner, Chris Kruse, leased land from Squire and opened a shingle mill on the northeastern shore of Lake Washington on January 1, 1901. Establishing a company town alongside the mill for his employees, McMasters named it after his earlier hometown in Canada, which in turn was named after the village in Scotland, registering the name with the state on January 10. By 1903, Kenmore had established a school system and post office, with McMasters named the first postmaster for the latter.

Despite cargo railway service passing through the area as early as 1887 via the Seattle, Lake Shore and Eastern Railway, most access to the city in its early days was by boat, with regular ferry service to Seattle, Bothell, and Woodinville starting in 1906. The city later gained a passenger railroad stop. The first improved road connection to Seattle and Bothell—the Red Brick Road—opened between 1913 and 1914, with bus service following the laying of the bricks. As a result, Kenmore became a country retreat for weekend gardeners with local landowners selling off clear-cut "garden plots" to Seattlites with automobiles and green thumbs. It attracted at least two short-lived nudist camps during the 1920s.

Far more striking, however, was the impact of Prohibition. Kenmore quickly became famous in Seattle for its fine country dining and, more importantly, its fine country drinking, as a substantial illegal alcohol industry developed to meet the demands of Jazz Age Seattle nightlife. Although relatively close to Seattle proper thanks to Bothell Way's status as one of the few improved roads then heading north from downtown it was nonetheless far enough out that Department of Revenue officers could, for the most part, ignore it.

The Blind Pig, a roadhouse on Shuter's Landing at Lake Washington, was probably the most famous of the Kenmore speakeasys. At the lakeside, its illegal hooch could be dumped into the lake quickly and easily should it become necessary. Few people were fooled; the name itself was, in fact, a well-known slang term meaning "speakeasy". But despite its notoriety, the Pig was not even the city's most infamous saloon. Routine violence and fist-fights at the Inglewood Tavern earned that establishment an alternative name: the Bucket of Blood.

This archipelago of dining and entertainment – over 30 different restaurants, dance halls, bars, and clubs in a three-block area – remained a major part of Kenmore's identity through the 1940s.

=== Great Depression, World War II and post-war redevelopment ===
Once the Great Depression hit, Kenmore became home for a small settlement of workers under President Franklin D. Roosevelt's Back to the Land program. Paid by the Works Progress Administration, a small number of workers were resettled in an area of north-central Kenmore where lumberjacks and their wives had been known to settle before, which became known as "Voucherville", after the vouchers the WPA paid between rounds of employment in lieu of a cash salary.

After the end of World War II, Kenmore became home to US Army Nike Hercules missile batteries as part of cold-war era defense plans. These nuclear-tipped anti-aircraft missiles were intended to protect Seattle and environs from Soviet bombers, should war break out. They were removed in 1974.

The post-war era largely transformed downtown. Kenmore Air Harbor, which today is one of the world's largest seaplane-only airports, opened not far from the old location of the Blind Pig; Kenmore Air itself today runs a fleet of seaplanes serving waterside destinations throughout Cascadia. At the same time, Kenmore's immediate proximity to Seattle—just two miles (3 km) north of modern Seattle city limits— made it an early target of post-war housing development. The first plats in the new Uplake neighborhood were sold in 1954. Housing development continued throughout the Kenmore area for the next several decades, mostly following the postwar suburban model; industrial and commercial growth followed quickly behind, and within a few decades, most of the old Kenmore dining and drinking had vanished, replaced by shopping centers, industrial development, and housing. However, one part of this new development brought its own history along with it: the Jewel Box Building in downtown Kenmore is a Seattle World's Fair artifact, moved from Seattle Center to Kenmore after the end of the fair in October, 1962.

=== 1954–present: Incorporation and downtown revitalization ===
Kenmore residents considered incorporation many times since the town's founding; one such incorporation vote failed in 1954. The idea gained popular support through the 1990s, however, partly in response to the passage of the Washington State Growth Management Act of 1990. Formation of an exploration committee in 1995 led to a successful public vote shortly thereafter, and the city formally incorporated on August 31, 1998, 97 years after its original founding.

The Hangar at Town Square

Following incorporation, the new government set about devising a local set of zoning codes and a downtown development plan with the intent of reviving and rebuilding the traditional core areas of the city. A significant component of this plan involved extensive use of land now owned by the city, in the area known within the plan as the Northwest Quadrant. An open invitation was extended to all architects and developers to submit development plans for this newly available area in December, 2005. The City Council chose to negotiate primarily with Kenmore Partners LLC in April 2006. Design plans were submitted to the city the following summer, with a conceptual overview made available to the public at the same time. In 2012, the City of Kenmore and Kenmore Partners LLC broke off their development agreement. After the split, Kenmore sold off 4.75 acres of former park and ride property in 2013 and sold two parcels north of Town Square in 2016 to MainStreet Property Group LLC to develop into mixed-use buildings. In 2017, Kenmore opened a community center called the Hangar at Town Square, a community gathering space which is available to the public to reserve for free.

The city gained its first college in 1996, with the relocation of Bastyr University from Seattle onto the grounds of the former St. Edward Seminary.

Kenmore's oldest roads, now known most often by their county-assigned number systems, originally had more traditional names such as Cat's Whiskers Road (61st Avenue NE), Squire Boulevard (later Red Brick Road, now Bothell Way/SR 522), and Remington Drive (NE 181st Street). These traditional names were reinstated in 2007 as secondary names in the downtown area.

In 2009, Kenmore started building a new city hall on the corner of 68th Avenue Northeast and 181st Avenue Northeast. The building received a LEED gold rating and features solar panels, energy efficient lighting, and a rain garden among other energy-saving features. On May 22, 2010, Kenmore formally opened the new city hall building.

A proposal to build an affordable housing complex with 100 units for transitional housing, to be operated by the nonprofit Plymouth Housing, was rejected by the Kenmore City Council in 2023. Several councilmembers claimed that they were unaware that the project would be used for transitional housing, which was opposed by some local residents. The decision was criticized by local leaders and housing advocates; the state funding allocated for the project was instead redirected to a 100-unit affordable housing complex that Plymouth Housing proposed in Redmond.

== Geography ==
Kenmore has borders encompassing all of the north shore and a significant portion of the northeastern shore of Lake Washington. The local terrain is typical of the Puget Sound lowlands, consisting largely of rolling hills formed from glacial till, occasionally interrupted by flatlands typically found near substantial bodies of water. The largest river is the Sammamish, which connects Lake Sammamish to Lake Washington, and divides the city into northern and southern halves. Additionally, the northeastern corner of the city includes a narrow set of swamps and marshlands running north to south along Swamp Creek.

The city has a total area of 6.26 square miles (16.21 km^{2}), of which, 6.15 square miles (15.93 km^{2}) is land and 0.11 square miles (0.28 km^{2}) is water.

=== Climate ===
The climate of Kenmore is substantially similar to that of nearby Seattle, being defined principally by its latitude, proximity to the Pacific Ocean and Puget Sound, and inclusion in the Puget Sound Convergence Zone. As such, it is usually considered Marine west coast in nature, with damp, cool winters, and mild, dry summers, despite being further north than cities such as Toronto, Ontario and Montreal, Quebec.

=== Neighborhoods ===
Kenmore has several distinct neighborhoods. These include:

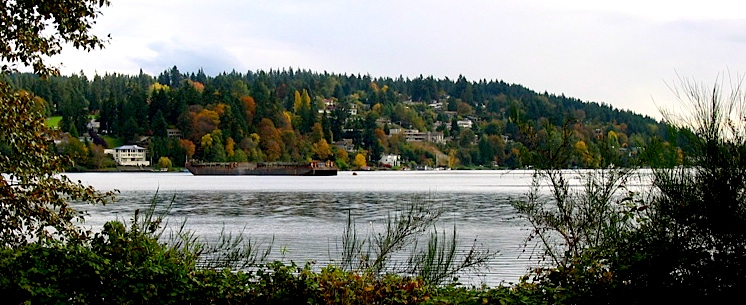
Arrowhead, Kenmore, from across Lake Washington in Log Boom Park

- Arrowhead, in southern Kenmore, on the west (or lake) side, saw its first house built in 1888. This was a small summer cabin; the oldest house still standing dates from 1929.
- Inglewood, in southern Kenmore, was first platted in 1953, with large-scale suburban development appearing by 1962.
- Lower Moorlands, in eastern Kenmore, saw its first house in 1904. The significant development occurring in this area after World War I included the 1927 landmark Charles and Elvera Thomsen House.
- Upper Moorlands, also in eastern Kenmore, saw initial building in 1938-1939 but stayed quite rural due to the lack of a good water system until suburban development arrived in the mid-1950s.
- Central (or downtown) Kenmore hugs Bothell Way and formed the original core of the city. Today it is Kenmore's commercial and industrial core.

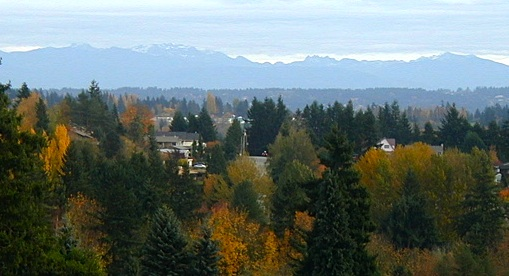
Northern Kenmore and the Cascade Mountains as seen from Uplake Terrace, looking east

- Northlake Terrace, an early residential neighborhood just north of town, is now a mix of commercial and residential development. Much of the eastern portion of this area is to be redeveloped as part of the new Downtown Plan.
- Linwood Heights, in northwest Kenmore, was first founded as part of the "Back to the Land" movement during the Great Depression. Then derisively referred to as Voucherville, it has long since been redeveloped and is now largely suburban housing. Portions were annexed by Lake Forest Park in 1995, predating Kenmore's formal incorporation.
- Kenlake Vista, in northern Kenmore, is post-war residential suburban housing.
- Uplake Terrace, a suburban neighborhood developed started in 1953.
- Kenmore Terrace
- Northshore Summit

== Demographics ==
Historical population
Census	Pop.	Note	%±
1980	7,281		—
1990	8,917		22.5%
2000	18,678		109.5%
2010	20,460		9.5%
2020	23,914		16.9%
2024 (est.)	24,166		1.1%
U.S. Decennial Census

=== 2020 census ===
As of the 2020 census, Kenmore had a population of 23,914. The median age was 39.2 years. 21.8% of residents were under the age of 18 and 14.8% of residents were 65 years of age or older. For every 100 females there were 98.7 males, and for every 100 females age 18 and over there were 97.2 males age 18 and over.

100.0% of residents lived in urban areas, while 0.0% lived in rural areas.

There were 9,270 households in Kenmore, of which 32.5% had children under the age of 18 living in them. Of all households, 55.5% were married-couple households, 16.9% were households with a male householder and no spouse or partner present, and 21.1% were households with a female householder and no spouse or partner present. About 23.7% of all households were made up of individuals and 8.8% had someone living alone who was 65 years of age or older.

There were 9,589 housing units, of which 3.3% were vacant. The homeowner vacancy rate was 0.8% and the rental vacancy rate was 3.5%.

Racial composition as of the 2020 census
Race	Number	Percent
White	16,034	67.0%
Black or African American	515	2.2%
American Indian and Alaska Native	114	0.5%
Asian	3,585	15.0%
Native Hawaiian and Other Pacific Islander	71	0.3%
Some other race	863	3.6%
Two or more races	2,732	11.4%
Hispanic or Latino (of any race)	2,171	9.1%

=== 2015 American Community Survey ===
In 2015 the median income for a household in the city was $90,588, and the median income for a family was $102,374. Males had a median income of $76,688 versus $58,281 for females. The per capita income for the city was $40,192. About 5.5% of families and 8.6% of the population were below the poverty line, including 10.4% of those under age 18 and 7.5% of those age 65 or over.

=== 2010 census ===
As of the 2010 census, there were 20,460 people, 7,984 households, and 5,487 families residing in the city. The population density was 3,326.8 inhabitants per square mile (1,284.5/km^{2}). There were 8,569 housing units at an average density of 1,393.3 per square mile (538.0/km^{2}). The racial makeup of the city was 79.9% White, 1.6% African American, 0.5% Native American, 10.5% Asian, 0.3% Pacific Islander, 2.5% from other races, and 4.5% from two or more races. Hispanic or Latino of any race were 7.0% of the population.

There were 7,984 households, of which 33.5% had children under the age of 18 living with them, 55.3% were married couples living together, 9.1% had a female householder with no husband present, 4.3% had a male householder with no wife present, and 31.3% were non-families. 23.4% of all households were made up of individuals, and 7.9% had someone living alone who was 65 years of age or older. The average household size was 2.55 and the average family size was 3.01.

The median age in the city was 39.5 years. 22.8% of residents were under the age of 18; 7.5% were between the ages of 18 and 24; 28.2% were from 25 to 44; 29.6% were from 45 to 64; and 11.9% were 65 years of age or older. The gender makeup of the city was 49.6% male and 50.4% female.

== Economy ==
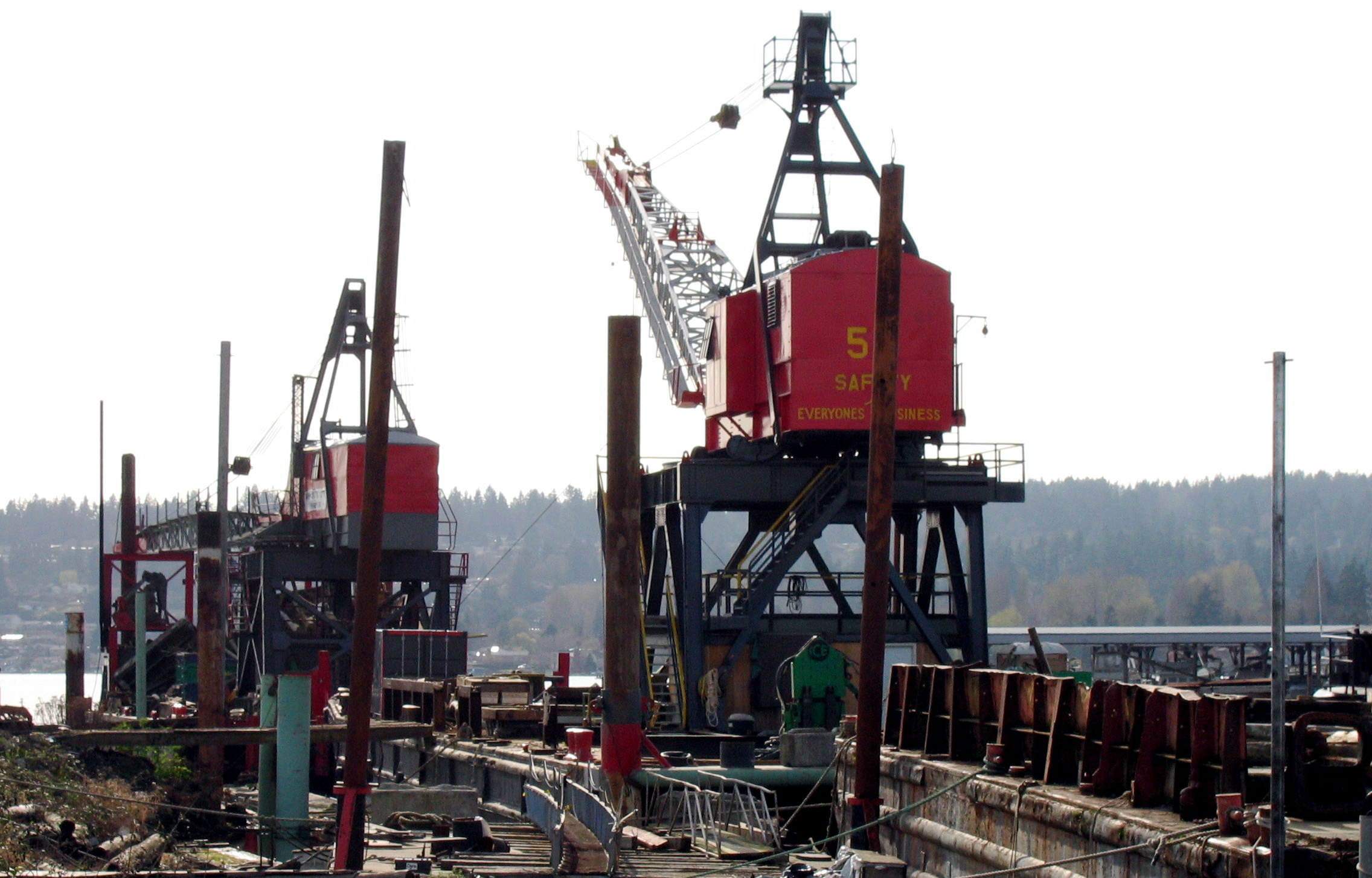
Cranes in Kenmore harbor

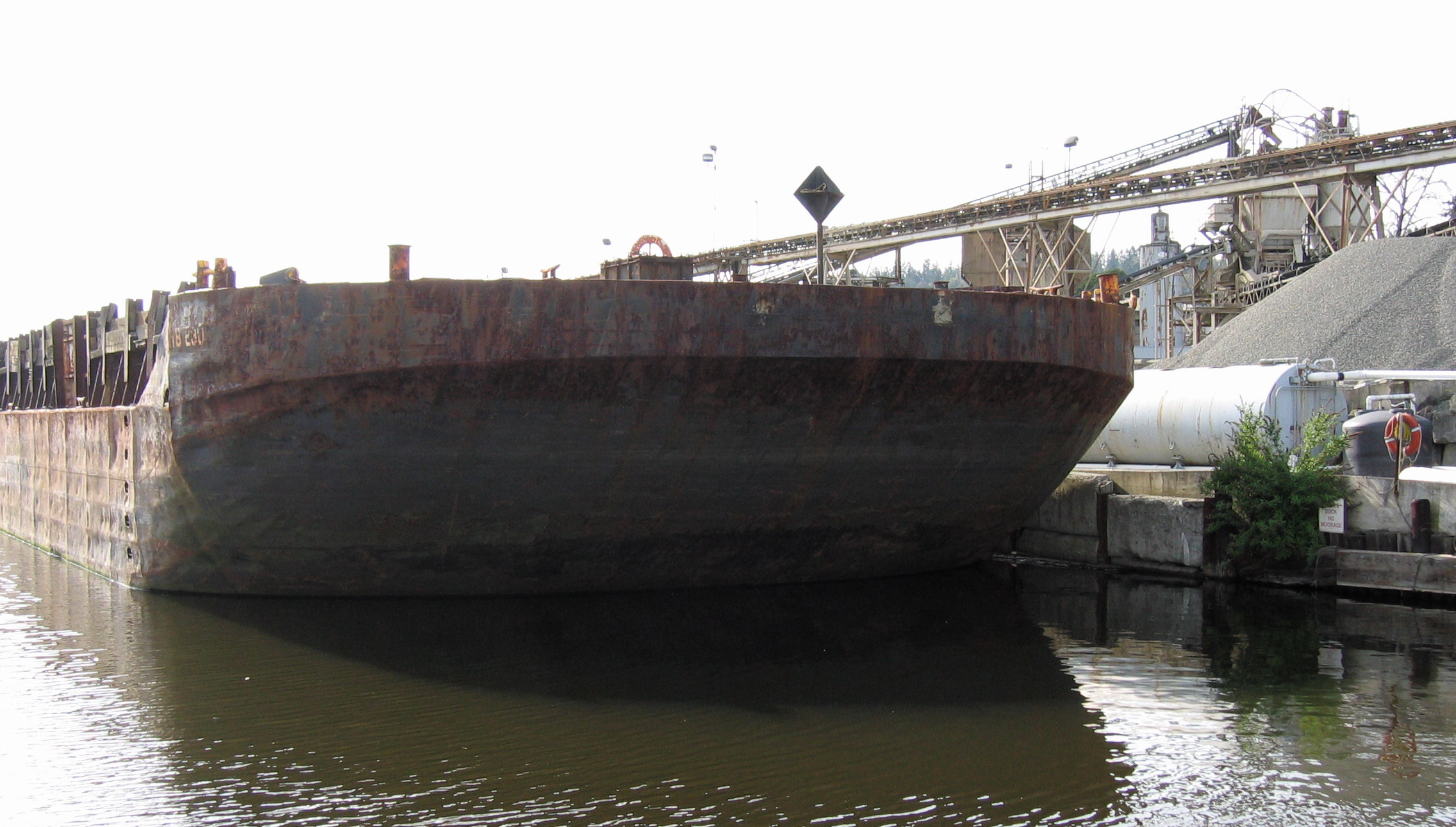
Cement barge offloading at Kenmore Ready-Mix

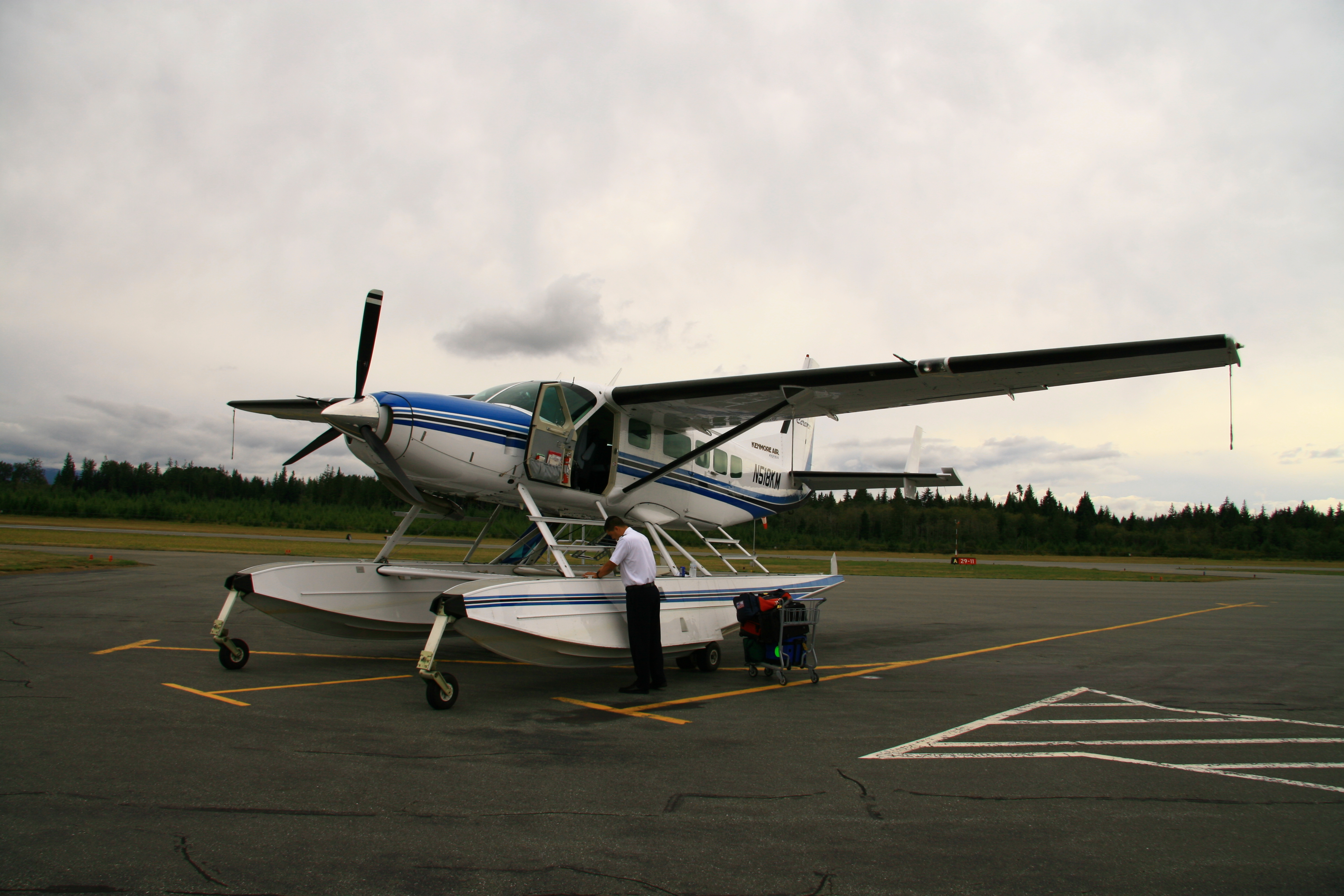
A Kenmore Air Cessna 208 on the ground in Campbell River

While in large part now a bedroom community for workers commuting to nearby Seattle, Bothell, and Redmond, Kenmore retains a significant independent economic core centered around durable goods (construction materials, concrete, asphalt) and special trade contracting (construction, heavy construction, and highways).

Kenmore also hosts one of the last industrial ports on Lake Washington, at the mouth of the Sammamish River. Larger local businesses near the port include Rinker Materials's Kenmore plant, Kenmore Ready-Mix (cements and asphalts, a division of Glacier Northwest), Pacific Topsoils (topsoils and landscape construction materials), Michael Homchick Stoneworks (stone fabrication and installation), Plywood Supply (lumber, plywood, and millwork, wholesale, retail, and company headquarters), and several others. As home to the James G. Murphy Company, one of the ten largest commercial/industrial auction houses in the United States, the city is also an auction center. Significant non-durable-goods businesses include the headquarters of Kenmore Air, a large private seaplane-based airline; Alaska General Seafoods's company headquarters and processing plant; Bastyr University, a school of naturopathic medicine.

== Education ==
Kenmore is part of the Northshore School District, and the local high school is Inglemoor High School. Inglemoor High School is known for its IB program. Kenmore originally had its own school district, Kenmore School District No. 141, which was established in 1903; it was consolidated into its Bothell counterpart in 1916, which in turn was consolidated with the Woodinville district to form Northshore in 1959.

The nonprofit group Saint Edward Environmental Learning Center provides quarterly environmental education classes to the public in conjunction with Washington State Parks and Saint Edward State Park. They also operate the ALEAFA Model Public High School. The Kenmore Library Association, a volunteer group affiliated with the local library, plans and sponsors library programming.

There is a portion of Kenmore extending into the Lake Washington School District, but it consists of portions of the Saint Edward State Park.

Kenmore is home to Bastyr University, a private school that focuses on naturopathic medicine founded in 1978 and accredited by the Northwest Commission on Colleges and Universities (NWCCU). The 51-acre (21 ha) campus for Bastyr was originally a Catholic seminary that was built in 1931 and later subdivided between the university and Saint Edward State Park. The city is also situated between the University of Washington's main Seattle campus and UW Bothell and Cascadia College, both in nearby Bothell.

== Government and politics ==
Presidential Elections Results
Year	Republican	Democratic	Third Parties
2020	23.25% 3,310	73.65% 10,485	3.10% 442

Kenmore has a Council–manager government, being governed by a city council consisting of seven council members, each of whom is elected to a four-year term. Council elections are held every two years, with either three or four positions standing, depending upon year. All positions are nonpartisan and at-large, elected by the entire city voting population. The Council passes ordinances, sets policies, and elects from its own membership a Mayor and Deputy Mayor for two-year terms. The Council holds regular meetings on the second, third, and fourth Mondays of each month, with special meetings added as needed.

Kenmore City Hall

Day-to-day operations of the city are administered by a City Manager, hired by the City Council. City code also stipulates the hiring of a full-time City Clerk. Major committees included in Kenmore Municipal Code are the Landmarks and Heritage Commission, the Planning Commission, and the Library Advisory Board.

City of Kenmore police duties are subcontracted through the King County Sheriff's Office; the original City of Kenmore Fire Department's duties were expanded via agreement with nearby Lake Forest Park, becoming the Northshore Fire Department.

Shortly after its incorporation in 1998, the city passed a moratorium on cardrooms and other gambling establishments; at the time, Kenmore had a single cardroom, which was later grandfathered into an expanded ban in 2003. After the ban was struck down and reinstated, the issue was decided in a public referendum in September 2004 that did not pass a ban on cardrooms, but the city council kept its ban in place. The moratorium was overturned by the King County Superior Court following a lawsuit from the cardroom's owner, but a new ban was passed in 2005 and appealed to the federal Ninth Circuit, where the ban was upheld. Following negotiations between the city, the state gambling commission, and the owner, the cardroom closed in 2009.

=== Police ===
Kenmore contracts with the King County Sheriff's Office for police services. Deputies assigned to Kenmore wear city uniforms and drive patrol cars marked with the city logo. As of April 2024, there were 12 officers, including 10 patrol officers and one chief assigned full-time to the city.

== Culture ==
=== Civic events and festivals ===
Major annual civic events include:

- The Kenmore Summer Concert Series, hosted at Saint Edward State Park
- The annual Kenmore Art Show, a juried art exhibition sponsored by the Arts of Kenmore.
- Fourth of July Fireworks, a fireworks display at Log Boom Park, a tradition which started in 2006.
- Farmers Market at Town Square held every Wednesday from June to August; debuted in 2022 as a pilot program

=== Media ===
Kenmore is served by Seattle-area media, but town and neighborhood events are covered primarily by the Bothell/Kenmore Reporter, a weekly and online newspaper published by Sound Publishing. Once a month, a Kenmore city government update is printed within the newspaper as a two- to four-page supplement. For its part, the city also sends out a quarterly eight-page newsletter to all residents discussing government activities, development project status reports, budgetary summaries, and a community events calendar.

Family Circle Magazine selected Kenmore, Washington as one of the "10 Best Towns for families" in their August 2009 edition. Seattle Magazine also ranked Kenmore as the best Seattle-area neighborhood or surrounding city for 2008–2009.

=== Parks ===
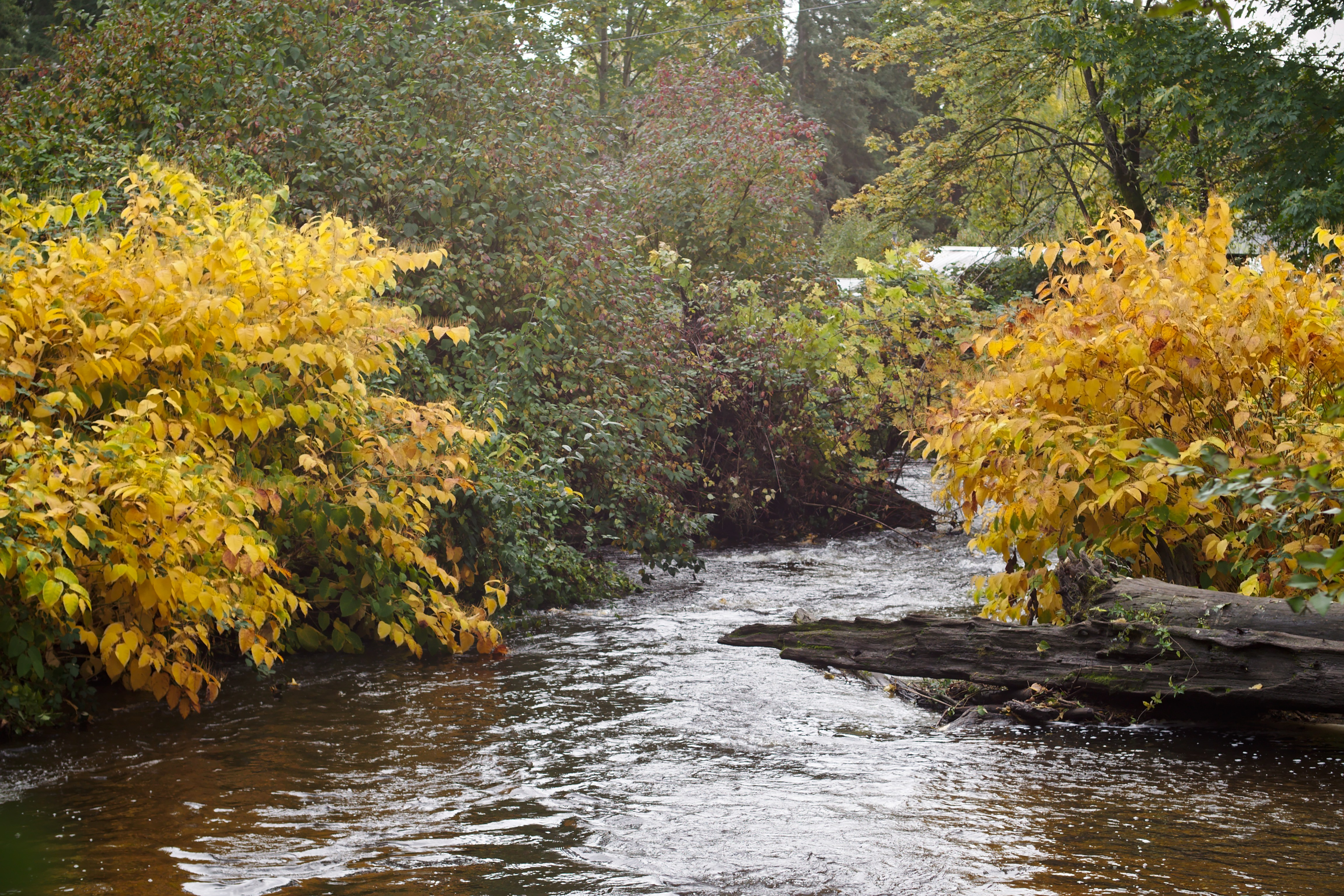
Wallace Swamp Creek Park in 2017

Not all parks within city limits are operated by city government; the Burke-Gilman Trail is a King County park, and St. Edward State Park is operated by the Washington State Parks and Recreation Commission. Extant parks within city limits include:

- Burke-Gilman Trail, a King County park which, combined with the Sammamish River Trail, connects Marymoor Park just outside downtown Redmond through the downtowns of Woodinville, Bothell, Kenmore, and Lake Forest Park to Gas Works Park in Seattle and points west. Several other trails and bike routes branch off of this trail backbone.
- ƛ̕ax̌ʷadis Park (formerly known as Squire's Landing), a park along the Sammamish River named for a former Lushootseed village located near downtown Kenmore
- Linwood Park, a small 3-acre (12,000 m^{2}) park in northwest Kenmore with grass commons, playground, and picnic tables
- Moorlands Park, a 5-acre (20,000 m^{2}) park which includes baseball and basketball facilities in southeastern Kenmore
- Jack V. Crawford Skate Court, a 5,200 feet (1,600 m) skate park located in downtown Kenmore behind Kenmore City Hall
- Northshore Summit Park, a 3.6 acres (15,000 m^{2}) park located in northern Kenmore, with a playground, walking trails, and picnic areas.
- Rhododendron Park, formerly Kenmore Park, a 13-acre (53,000 m^{2}) park with hundreds of Rhododendron plants and a public boathouse along the Sammamish River.
- Saint Edward State Park, the largest park in Kenmore at 365 acres (1.48 km^{2}); it includes over half a mile of undeveloped Lake Washington shoreline, the historic Saint Edward Seminary (which is now used as a hotel) and gymnasium, and the largest playground in the state
- Swamp Creek Park, along the Sammamish River, consists of city-purchased farmland currently left in an undeveloped state
- Log Boom Park (Tracy Owen Station), includes 16 acres (65,000 m^{2}) of shoreline and a large walking dock extending out into the lake
- Wallace Swamp Creek Park, 17 acres (69,000 m^{2}) a park that surrounds Swamp Creek in northeast Kenmore and features walking trails

=== Commemorations ===
Kenmore's official flower is the dahlia, official bird is the great blue heron, and official evergreen is the rhododendron.

== Notable people ==
- Anthony Arena (born 1990) – soccer player
- Burke Fahling (born 1997) – soccer player
- Steve Fossen (born 1949) – bassist and co-founder of the band Heart
- Susan Jensen (born 1956) – adult film actress
- Kirby Larson (born 1954) – author
- Pete Schoening (1927–2004) – mountain climber
- Charissa Thompson (born 1982) – television host and sportscaster
