= Roche Harbor Seaplane Base =

- IATA: RCE; ICAO: none; FAA LID: W39

Summary
- Airport type: Public
- Owner: Roche Harbor Resort
- Serves: Roche Harbor, Washington
- Elevation AMSL: 0 ft / 0 m
- Coordinates: 48°36′29″N 123°09′35″W

Map
- Location of airport in Washington RCE (the United States)

Runways
Direction	Length		Surface
Direction	ft	m	Surface
NE/SW	5,000	1,524	Water
NW/SE	2,500	762	Water

Statistics (2009)
- Aircraft operations: 2,800
- Source: Federal Aviation Administration

Roche Harbor Seaplane Base (IATA: RCE, FAA LID: W39) is a public-use seaplane base located adjacent to Roche Harbor, on San Juan Island in San Juan County, Washington, United States. It is owned by the Roche Harbor Resort.

== Facilities and aircraft ==
Roche Harbor Seaplane Base has two seaplane landing areas: NE/SW is 5,000 by 1,000 feet (1,524 x 305 m) and NW/SE is 2,500 by 500 feet (762 x 152 m). For the 12-month period ending May 31, 2009, the airport had 2,800 aircraft operations, an average of 233 per month: 57% air taxi and 43% general aviation.

== Airlines and destinations ==
Airlines	Destinations
Kenmore Air	Friday Harbor–Seaplane, Seattle–Lake Union

== See also ==
- List of airports in Washington
