= Saint Edward Seminary =

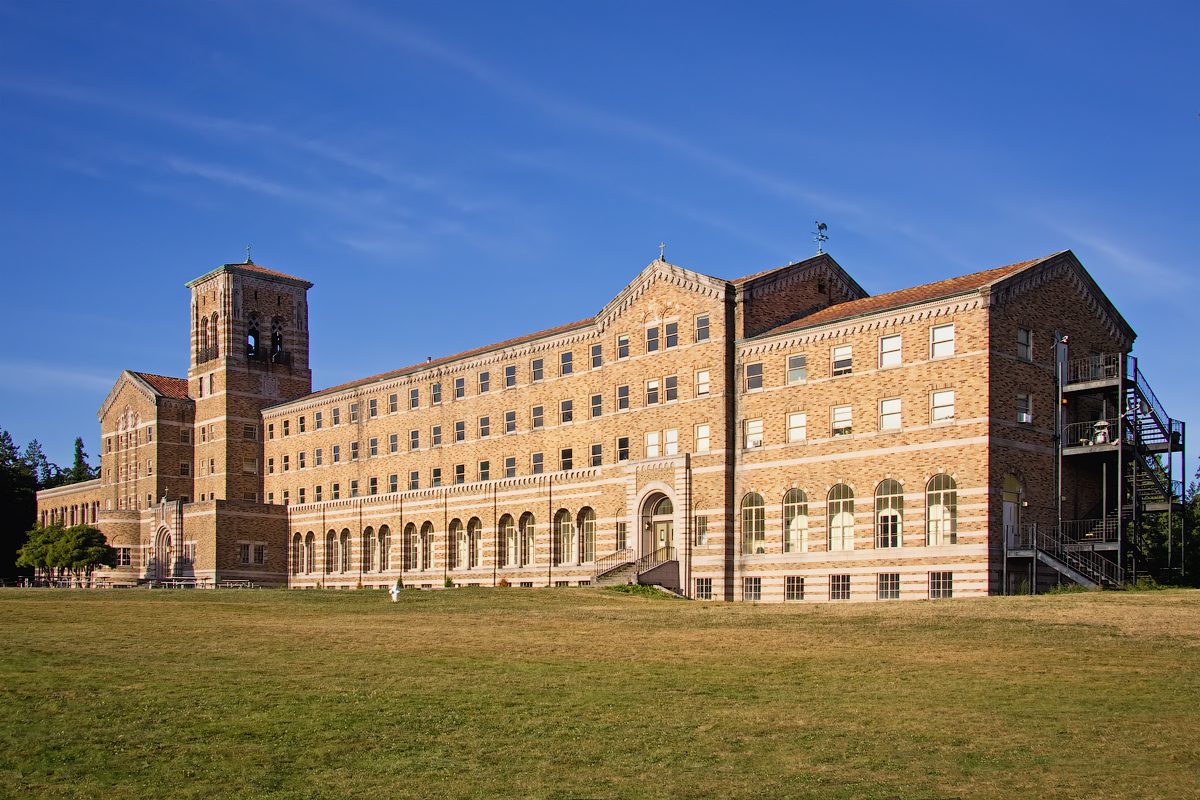
- Type: Seminary
- Active: 1930–1976
- Affiliations: Roman Catholic
- Location: Kenmore, Washington, United States; 47.7331°N 122.2572°W

- Saint Edward Seminary
- U.S. National Register of Historic Places
- U.S. Historic district
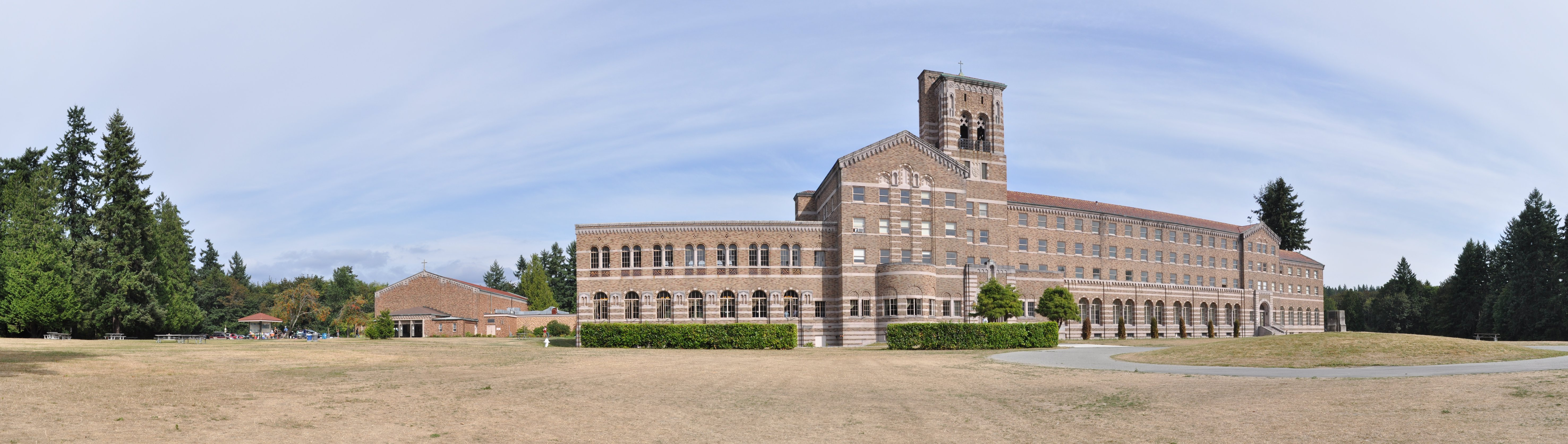
- St. Edward Seminary

- Location within Washington (state)
- Nearest city: Kenmore, Washington
- Area: 319 acres (129 ha)
- Architect: Graham, John Sr.; Lance, McGuire & Muri, et al.
- Architectural style: Romanesque
- NRHP reference No.: 07000137
- Added to NRHP: March 8, 2007

Saint Edward Seminary (sometimes Saint Edward's Seminary) was an institution for developing Catholic priests in the US state of Washington. Dedicated to Saint Edward the Confessor and located in Kenmore, it operated for 46 years before closing in 1976. The seminary and most of its grounds now constitute Saint Edward State Park. The seminary was located on a 366 acres (148 ha; 0.572 sq mi) property purchased in the late 1920s. Building plans were scaled back in 1929 due to the Great Depression. In 1931, the seminary opened as a minor seminary; it became a major (college level) seminary in 1935. In 1958, Saint Thomas the Apostle Seminary opened as a major seminary on 50 acres of the site and St. Edward continued as a minor seminary. The Catholic Archdiocese of Seattle closed St. Edward in 1976 and sold it to the State of Washington in 1977. It became Saint Edward State Park in 1978. After St. Thomas closed, Bastyr University leased and later bought that campus.

The Washington State Parks and Recreation Commission entered into an agreement with Daniels Realty Development to completely restore the historic Seminary building. The grand opening of the new Lodge at Saint Edward Park as a hotel, spa and restaurant was May 7, 2021.

== History ==
- 1920s: The land for the seminary is purchased by Bishop Edward John O'Dea, using his own personal inheritance, and donated to the Roman Catholic Archdiocese of Seattle for the purpose of building a seminary for diocesan priests
- October 13, 1930: Bishop O'Dea blesses the cornerstone for construction.
- 1931: Saint Edward Seminary opens, staffed by priests of the Sulpician Order (also known as Society of St. Sulpice), a teaching order. The building was designed by Seattle architect John Graham.
- 1935: Major seminary classes are added.
- 1939: The first class of 12 men is ordained.
- 1958: St. Thomas the Apostle Seminary opens on the higher ground of the property; St. Edward resumed its status as exclusively a minor seminary .
- 1969: The Carole Ann Wald Swimming Pool was dedicated, named for the sister of a seminary student, by their father a major donor. After the closing of the seminary, the pool provided indoor/year round public swimming programs for all ages and abilities, and home practice facility to nearby Inglemoor High School Viking men and women swim teams. It also is used as a practice facility by the Seattle Synchronized Swimming group.
- 1976: Due to declining enrollment, Saint Edward Seminary closes. The high school program continues for a short time at JFK High School in Seattle.
- 1977: The State of Washington buys most of the property (316 acres) with the assistance of a Land and Water Conservation Fund grant from the National Park Service and the Washington Interagency Committee for Outdoor Recreation. The property becomes Saint Edward State Park. The grounds of Saint Thomas Seminary (renamed Saint Thomas Center) are leased by Bastyr University, and subsequently purchased by the university in 2005.
- 1997: The former Saint Edward Seminary building is placed on the Washington State Heritage Register.
- 2005: Bastyr buys out its leased property.
- 2005: Washington State Parks begins a land-use planning project for Saint Edward State Park.
- Autumn 2006: Saint Edward Seminary nominated to the National Register of Historic Places
- 2007 With elevated public attention drawn by Citizens for Saint Edward Park(C4SEP), the State Legislature allocated $500k toward evaluation of the building's condition from the aggregate effects of years of underfunded and deferred maintenance, and $500k for immediate and sorely needed repairs.
- April 2007: Saint Edward Seminary is listed on the National Register of Historic Places.
- 2007-2008: Bassetti Architects selected to evaluate and report on the Seminary building conditions.
- April 2008 Ranger/Park Manager Mohammad Mostafavinassab reported that an additional $1.7mm is being funded for Phase 1 (repair/replace foundation and field drainage, and repair foundation), and to begin Phase 2 (Exterior repairs).
- May 2009: A video tour of the Seminary building becomes available, courtesy of the Seattle Times, with an accompanying writeup.
- December 2009: Carole Ann Wald Memorial Pool is mothballed.
- 2014: A public/private partnership to refurbish the main building as The Lodge At Saint Edward Park is announced. Ron Wright and Associates / Architects serves as the project architect and Lydig Construction operates as the contractor. Construction is scheduled to be completed in 2020.
- May 2021: The Lodge at Saint Edward Park opens.

== Notable alumni ==
- Archbishop Raymond Hunthausen
- Mike Murphy (Washington politician)
