= Fishermans Bay/LPS Seaplane Base =

Airport in Washington, United States

- IATA: LPS; ICAO: none; FAA LID: 81W

Summary
- Airport type: Private
- Owner: Lake Union Air Service, Inc.
- Serves: Lopez Island, Washington
- Elevation AMSL: 0 ft (0 m)
- Coordinates: 48°30′59″N 122°55′05″W

Map
- Location within Washington (state) Location within the United States

Runways
Direction	Length		Surface
Direction	ft	m	Surface
5/23	4,000	1,219	Water
14/32	2,500	762	Water
- Source: Federal Aviation Administration

Fishermans Bay/LPS Seaplane Base (IATA: LPS, FAA LID: 81W ) is a seaplane base located at Fishermans Bay on Lopez Island, in San Juan County, Washington, United States. It is owned by Lake Union Air Service, Inc.

== Facilities ==
Fishermans Bay/LPS Seaplane Base has seaplane landing areas: 5/23 is 4,000 by 200 feet (1,219 x 61 m) and 14/32 is 2,500 by 200 feet (762 x 61 m).

== Airlines and destinations ==
Airlines	Destinations
Kenmore Air	Seattle–Lake Union

== See also ==
- List of airports in Washington
- Lopez Island Airport
