= Bastyr University =

Alternative medicine university

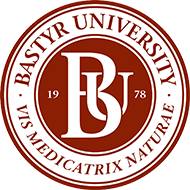
- Former names: John Bastyr College of Naturopathic Medicine; Bastyr College
- Motto: Vis medicatrix naturae
- Motto in English: The healing power of nature
- Type: Private university
- Established: 1978
- Chancellor: Joseph Pizzorno
- President: Randy Frisch
- Students: 734 (fall 2024)
- Undergraduates: 39 (fall 2024)
- Location: Kenmore, Washington, United States; 47.7304°N 122.2528°W
- Campus: 51 acres (21 ha)
- Colors: Cranberry and ginger
- Website: www.bastyr.edu

Bastyr University is a private alternative medicine university with campuses in Kenmore, Washington, and San Diego, California. Programs include naturopathic medicine, acupuncture, Traditional Asian medicine, nutrition, herbal medicine, psychology, and midwifery.

Some of Bastyr's programs teach and research topics that are considered pseudoscience, quackery, and fake by the scientific and medical communities. Quackwatch, a group against health fraud, put Bastyr University on its list of "questionable organizations" as a school which is "accredited but not recommended".

Bastyr University and similar naturopathic programs are not accredited as medical schools but as programs that are overseen by a naturopathic council which is not required to be scientific. Bastyr's naturopathic program has been accused by critics of misrepresenting its medical rigor and its ability to train primary care clinicians.

A 2024 report found that students in Bastyr's alternative medicine doctoral program had the second highest debt-to-income ratio among all US graduate programs, at 688%.

== History ==
Bastyr University was established in 1978 as the John Bastyr College of Naturopathic Medicine in Seattle. Four co-founders, Sheila Quinn, Joseph Pizzorno, Les Griffith, and Bill Mitchell, named the institution after John Bastyr, a teacher and advocate of naturopathy in the Seattle area. Baccalaureate, master's, and doctoral degree programs are offered. In 1984, the school was renamed Bastyr College; in 1994, it became Bastyr University.

In 1996, Bastyr relocated to its current location in the Saint Thomas Center, formerly St. Edward Seminary, a Catholic seminary building in Kenmore, Washington. Pizzorno served as president until his retirement in June 2000. During his tenure, Bastyr became the first accredited university of natural medicine and the first center for alternative medicine research funded by the National Institutes of Health's Office of Alternative Medicine, the predecessor to the controversial National Center for Complementary and Integrative Health.

Its campus is surrounded by Saint Edward State Park's fir and hemlock forest. In November, 2005, the university purchased the property, which it had been leasing from the Archdiocese of Seattle. In 2010, Bastyr merged with Seattle Midwifery School to offer a Master of Science degree to become a direct-entry midwife eligible for certification.

In 2024, Oregon Public Broadcasting reported that students who pursued doctorates of naturopathic medicine typically took on high levels of debt. For Bastyr, the median loan was $300,530 and the median earnings were $43,703, resulting in a debt to earnings ratio of 688%. This was the second highest ratio among graduate programs in the US, with only the naturopathic program at National University of Natural Medicine being higher.

== Academics ==
Bastyr offers bachelor's completion, master's, combined undergraduate/masters, doctoral, and certificate programs. Bastyr presents itself as the "Harvard of naturopathic medicine." The Princeton Review reports that the naturopathic medicine program at Bastyr had an acceptance rate of 68%.

=== Accreditation ===
Bastyr University is accredited by the Northwest Commission on Colleges and Universities (NWCCU) as an institution that can grant undergraduate and postgraduate degrees. Bastyr's Doctor of Naturopathic Medicine program is accredited by the Council on Naturopathic Medical Education (CNME), which is a naturopathic organization affiliated with the naturopathic profession. The Master of Science in Acupuncture (MSA), the Master of Science in Acupuncture and Oriental Medicine (MSAOM), and the Doctor of Acupuncture and Oriental Medicine (DAOM) are accredited by the Accreditation Commission for Acupuncture and Herbal Medicine (ACAHM).

The Accreditation Council for Education in Nutrition and Dietetics, the accrediting agency for the Academy of Nutrition and Dietetics, has accredited Bastyr's Bachelor of Science with a major in nutrition with Didactic Program in Dietetics, Master of Science in nutrition with Didactic Program in Dietetics, and Dietetic Internship.

Bastyr University has received approval from the state of Washington as a recognized midwifery training facility and provides education for midwifery students in the articulated Bachelor/Master of Science in Midwifery degree. Both programs are accredited through the Midwifery Education Accreditation Council.

The university is a member of the American Association of Naturopathic Medical Colleges and Council of Colleges of Acupuncture and Oriental Medicine.

=== Reception ===
[Bastyr naturopathic students] take classes with the same names as medical school courses, but pseudoscience and nonsensical information is integrated into every course.

— Britt Marie Hermes

These schools of quackery operate like cults. People are being brainwashed with books, by peers, through media and so forth.

— Edzard Ernst

The Bastyr curriculum has been criticized for teaching pseudoscience and quackery, as its courses in homeopathy, herbalism, acupuncture, and ayurvedic methods lack a compelling evidence basis. Clinical training in the naturopathic medicine program was revealed to be significantly fewer hours than what Bastyr claims to provide its students, focusing on dubious diagnostics to prescribe experimental and pseudoscientific treatments that do not adhere to medical standards of care. Research conducted at Bastyr has been criticized as being a waste of taxpayer dollars by studying implausible treatments inconsistent with the best understandings of science and medicine.

The former president of Bastyr, Joseph Pizzorno, has been criticized for promoting dangerous and ineffective naturopathic treatments. Pizzorno co-authored the Textbook of Natural Medicine, which includes recommendations to treat diseases ranging from acne to AIDS using combinations of vitamins, minerals, and herbs at doses that would cause toxicity. Pizzorno is an advocate of the discredited blood type diet, developed by fellow naturopath and Bastyr graduate Peter D'Adamo. Pizzorno called the diet "the medical breakthrough of the ages" and described D'Adamo as "the best Bastyr has to offer. The consensus among dietitians, physicians, and scientists is that blood type diets are unsupported by scientific evidence.

Naturopaths trained at Bastyr are required to study various non-medical folk remedies, including homeopathy. David Gorski has been highly critical of this requirement; for him this makes the university fail the "litmus test" of whether it adheres to "science and reality". In 1998, Bastyr offered an elective course in iridology, a debunked system of diagnosing medical conditions by looking for irregularities in the pigmentation of the iris.

In 2007, Bastyr University was found by the American Association of University Professors (AAUP) to have violated the standards of academic freedom and shared governance for faculty members who were fired without cause of academic due process. Bastyr was placed on the AAUP censure list for violating generally recognized principles of academic freedom and tenure, but that censure was removed in June 2021.

== Main campus ==
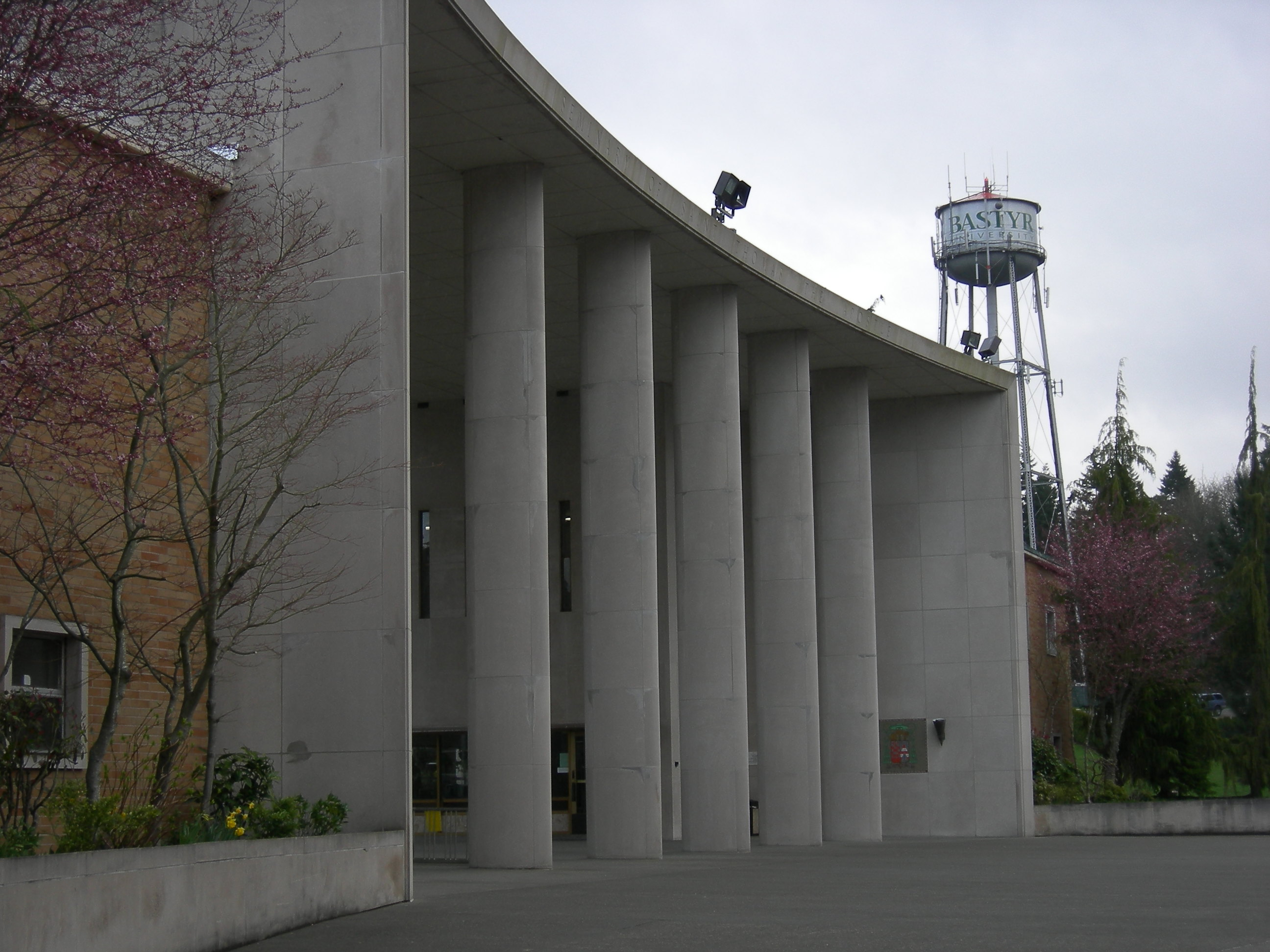
The building is the former St. Thomas Seminary

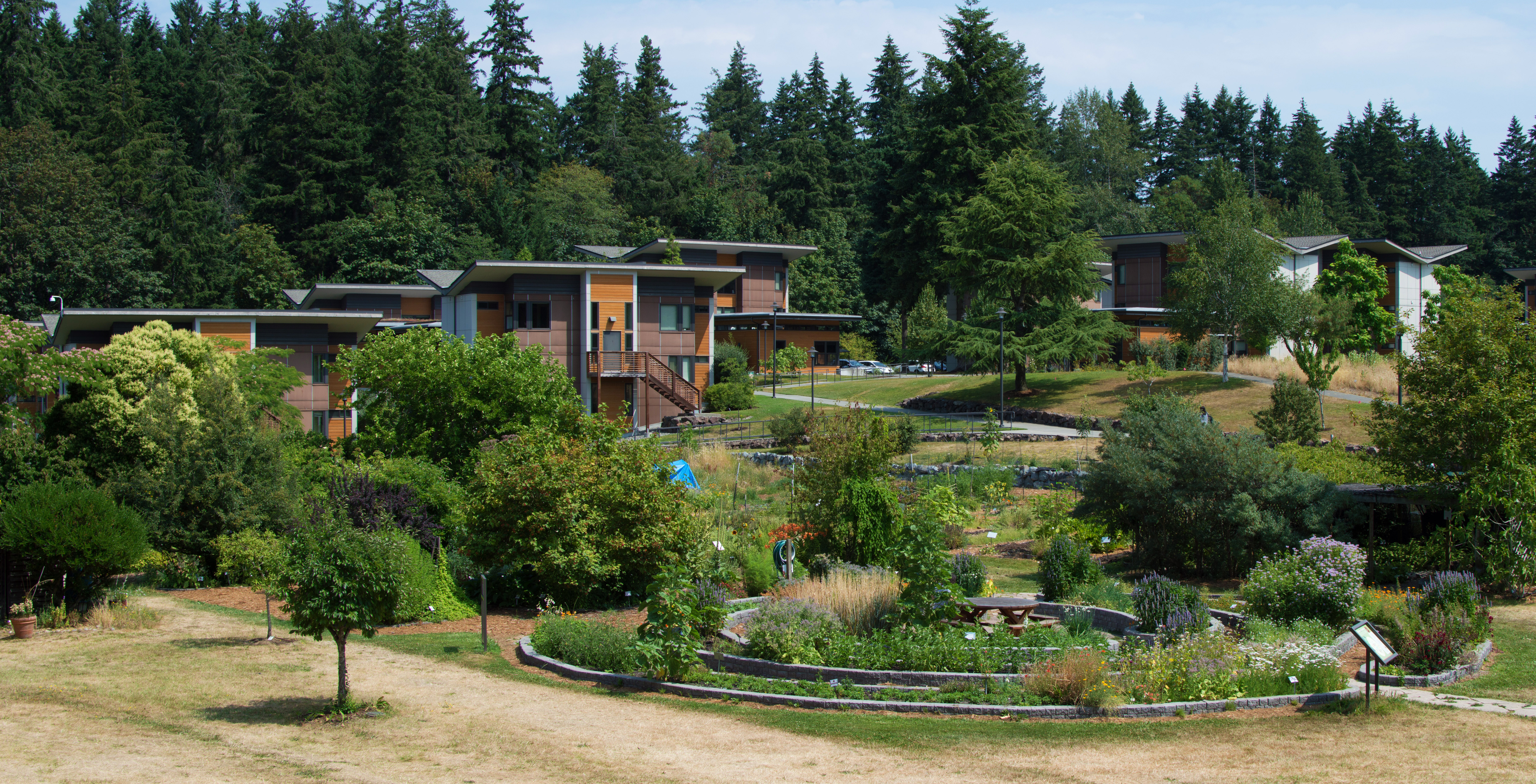
Bastyr's Student Village consists of 11 buildings, each housing a dozen students. Bastyr's medicinal herb garden can be seen in the foreground.

Bastyr's main campus sits on 51 acres (20.5 ha) of forests and athletic fields near Lake Washington. The Saint Edward State Park forest surrounds it on three sides. Housing facilities include a student village of 11 cottage-style buildings designed to blend into the campus's natural setting and built to Leadership in Energy and Environmental Design (LEED) platinum specifications.

The campus includes a renovated chapel, originally built in the 1950s for the St. Edward Seminary, which is now rented for musical performances, weddings, and other events. The chapel is known for its acoustical quality and architectural details, which include stained-glass windows, mosaics, and a box-beam ceiling. Scores for films including Brokeback Mountain, About Schmidt, Mr. Holland's Opus, and Mirror Mirror and for video games have been recorded in the chapel. Dave Matthews used it to record the orchestral track for one of his albums; his wife, Ashley Harper, is a naturopathic doctor who received her degree from Bastyr.

Seattle chef Jim Watkins became director of food services in 2011 and introduced meat dishes to the previously strictly vegetarian menu.

Bastyr operates a naturopathic teaching clinic in the Wallingford neighborhood of Seattle, where they offer consultations to the public.

The university announced in 2025 that it would consider selling part or all of its Kenmore campus, which had become half vacant as more classes moved to remote learning.

== California campus ==
In September 2012, Bastyr University California opened in a two-story commercial building in San Diego with a small teaching clinic on the ground floor. The program offers the doctor of naturopathic medicine program The first students were expected to graduate in spring 2016.

== Research ==
The Tierney Basic Sciences Research Laboratory was the first research laboratory at a natural health university when it opened in 2000. One study, run jointly with Fred Hutchinson Cancer Research Center, was funded by a $3.1 million grant awarded in 2010 from the National Center for Complementary and Alternative Medicine (NCCAM), part of the National Institutes of Health.

Despite receiving research funds from NCCAM, Bastyr has been criticized for studying topics that are implausible or impossible for medical effectiveness, which are considered a waste of precious federal research funds. A paranormal study funded by NCCAM and conducted at Bastyr investigated extrasensory perception and "distance healing" of HIV/AIDS patients by psychic methods. Bastyr's study was based on earlier work on the topic by Elisabeth Targ, which has been marked as scientific fraud. An unidentified member of the NCCAM office described another of Bastyr's AIDS research projects – in which people with AIDS were surveyed as to what alternative therapies they were trying and how effective they were – as a "million-dollar fishing expedition."

Other pseudoscientific topics researched at Bastyr include homeopathy, energy medicine, and remote viewing. These topics are disproved by numerous rigorous investigations that preceded the studies conducted at Bastyr and have been criticized as serving only to justify NCCAM's continued existence.

== Notable alumni ==
- Peter J. D'Adamo, a proponent of dangerous fad diets, and member of Bastyr University's first graduating naturopathic class.
- Britt Marie Hermes, a 2011 graduate of the doctorate of naturopathic medicine program who went on to practice for three years in Washington and Arizona before becoming an outspoken critic of homeopathy and naturopathic medicine.
