= Deer Harbor Sea Plane Base =

- IATA: DHB; ICAO: none; FAA LID: 42W

Summary
- Owner/Operator: Deer Harbor Marina
- Serves: Deer Harbor, Washington
- Location: Deer Harbor, Washington
- Coordinates: 48°37′0.0006″N 123°0′9.9966″W
- Website: Deer Harbor Marina
- Interactive map of Deer Harbor Sea Plane Base

Deer Harbor Sea Plane Base (IATA: DHB, FAA LID: 42W) is a seaplane base located in Deer Harbor, Washington on Orcas Island.

== Airlines and destinations ==
=== Passenger ===
| Airlines | Destinations |
|---|---|
| Kenmore Air | Kenmore, Seattle–Lake Union |
