= Rosario Seaplane Base =

- IATA: RSJ; ICAO: none; FAA LID: W49

Summary
- Airport type: Public
- Owner: Rosario Resort
- Serves: Rosario, Washington
- Elevation AMSL: 0 ft / 0 m
- Coordinates: 48°38′44″N 122°52′05″W

Map

Runways
| Direction | Length | | Surface |
| Direction | ft | m | Surface |
|---|---|---|---|
| 7/25 | 2,500 | 762 | Water |
| 16/34 | 10,000 | 3,048 | Water |

Statistics (2009)
- Aircraft operations: 2,500
- Source: Federal Aviation Administration

Rosario Seaplane Base (IATA: RSJ, FAA LID: W49) is a public-use seaplane base located adjacent to Rosario on Orcas Island in San Juan County, Washington, United States. It is owned by the Rosario Resort.

== Facilities and aircraft ==
Rosario Seaplane Base has two seaplane landing areas: 7/25 is 2,500 by 1,000 feet (762 x 305 m) and 16/34 is 10,000 by 1,000 feet (3,048 x 305 m). For the 12-month period ending May 31, 2009, the airport had 2,500 aircraft operations, an average of 208 per month: 84% air taxi and 16% general aviation.

== Airlines and destinations ==
| Airlines | Destinations |
|---|---|
| Kenmore Air | Seattle–Lake Union |

== See also ==
- List of airports in Washington
