= Rosario, Washington =

Unincorporated community in San Juan County, Washington

- Unincorporated community
- Location within Washington (state) Location within the United States
- Coordinates: 48°38′50″N 12°52′35″W
- Country: United States
- State: Washington
- County: San Juan
- Established: 1906
- Elevation: 164 ft (50 m)
- Time zone: UTC-8 (Pacific (PST))
  - Summer (DST): UTC-7 (PDT)
- GNIS feature ID: 1512618

Rosario is an unincorporated community in San Juan County, in the U.S. state of Washington.

== History ==
A post office called Rosario was established in 1906, and remained in operation until 1954. The community takes its name from nearby Rosario Strait.

== See also ==
- List of unincorporated communities in Washington
