= Lopez Island =

Island of the San Juan Islands in Washington state, United States

Lopez
- Location of Lopez Island in the San Juans
- Interactive map of Lopez

Geography
- Location: Pacific Northwest
- Coordinates: 48°28′44″N 122°53′31″W
- Archipelago: San Juan Islands
- Area: 29.81 sq mi (77.2 km^{2})

Administration
- United States
- State: Washington
- County: San Juan

Demographics
- Population: 3,156 (2020)

Lopez Island is the third largest of the San Juan Islands and an unincorporated town in San Juan County, Washington, United States. Lopez Island is 29.81 square miles (77.2 km^{2}) in land area. The 2020 census population was 3,156, though the population swells in the summer, as second homes, rental houses, and campsites fill up.

== History ==
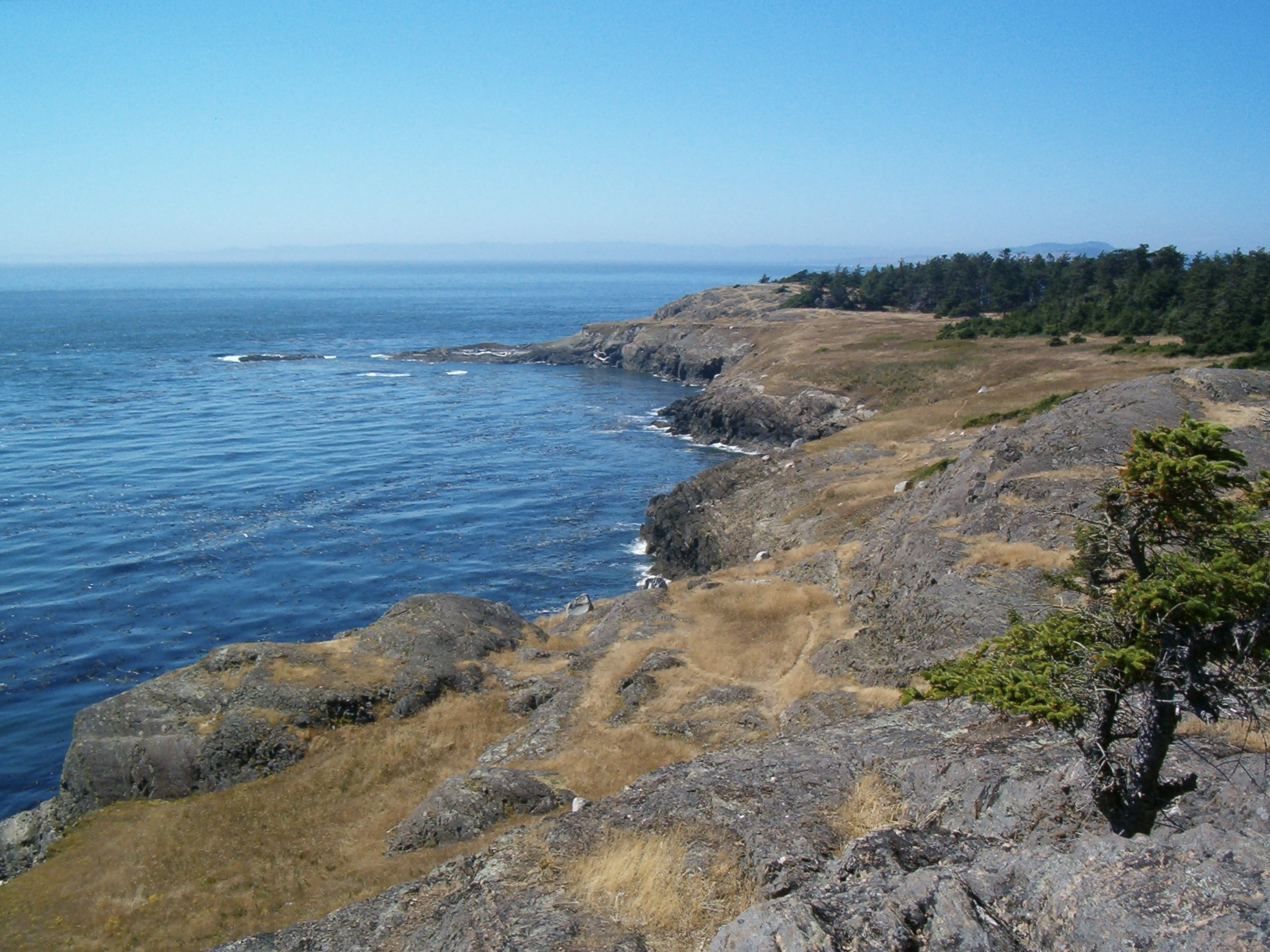
Iceberg Point at the southern tip of Lopez Island overlooking the Strait of Juan de Fuca

The ancestors of today's Northern Straits Coast Salish people began to appear in the wake of the continental ice sheet that started to recede 11,000 years ago. Archaeological evidence suggests that the island supported hunting and gathering between 6,000 and 8,000 years ago. The marine culture encountered by the first Europeans to the area developed about 2,500 years ago, and traces of its once thriving villages remain in the shell middens found along the shoreline of American and English camps and throughout the San Juan islands.

During the Wilkes Expedition, Lopez Island was given the name Chauncey Island, after the American naval commander Isaac Chauncey. When the British reorganized the official admiralty naval charts in 1847, Henry Kellett systematically removed many of Wilkes's names. He renamed the island Lopez, for Gonzalo López de Haro, the Spanish naval officer who was the first European to sail to the San Juan Islands archipelago.

The Lopez Island Historical Museum collects and preserves the regional history of Lopez and the San Juan Islands. The museum features artifacts reflecting Lopez's contributions to the maritime, fishing and farming industries. The museum has an extensive archive of local historical documents as well as artifacts depicting life on Lopez Island in the late 19th and early 20th centuries.

== Demographics ==
=== 2010 census ===
As of the 2010 census, there were 2,383 people, 1,204 households, and 719 families residing in the city. The racial makeup of the city was 93.6% White, 0.3% African American, 0.9% Native American, 1.2% Asian, 1.2% from other races, and 2.7% from two or more races. Hispanic or Latino of any race were 4.6% of the population.

There were 1,204 households, of which 14% had children under the age of 18 living with them, 52% were married couples living together, 4.7% had a female householder with no husband present, 3.0% had a male householder with no wife present, and 40.3% were non-families. 33.3% of all households were made up of individuals, and 13.4% had someone living alone who was 65 years of age or older. The average household size was 1.97 and the average family size was 2.45.

The median age in the city was 56.9 years. 12.9% of residents were under the age of 18; 8.6%, 28.7% were 65 years of age or older. The gender makeup of the city was 49.5% male and 50.5% female.

== Geography ==
Lopez Island is flatter than most of the other major San Juan Islands. It is also the most rural of the larger islands, and has rolling terrain of forest, farmland, and beaches. The island is longest in the north–south direction.

=== Climate ===
This region experiences warm and dry summers, with no average monthly temperatures above 71.6 °F. According to the Köppen Climate Classification system, Lopez Island has a warm-summer Mediterranean climate, abbreviated "Csb" on climate maps.

== Transportation ==
There are no highways on Lopez Island, and no bridges connecting to the mainland or other islands. The primary means of travel to and from Lopez Island is by ferry. The ferry terminal is located at the extreme north end of the island. It is the first stop of four on the Washington State Ferries’ San Juan Islands run. A typical sailing from Anacortes takes approximately 40 minutes.

Lopez Island Airport is the main airstrip for the island, located on its west side, offering daily commercial flights. Charter floatplanes land in Fisherman Bay at Fisherman Bay Seaplane Base, located approximately three-fourths mile north of the airport. A small private airstrip called Windsock Airport is located less than one and a half miles from the ferry terminal.

== Economy and tourism ==
Lopez is home to a large number of tourist-related businesses, largely country-style bed and breakfasts and rental houses, many with ocean views. There is a vineyard, one hotel and resort, two public marinas, several restaurants and cafes, a Zagat-rated gourmet restaurant, a small bookstore, and two coffee shops. The summer months' Saturday Market in Lopez Village is filled with arts and crafts, local farm produce, and community activities.

Lopez Island is a popular destination for bicycle tourists. Bicyclists are advised to avoid Center Road, which is not as wide as other island roads. But overall, the drivers are bicycle-friendly and the roads are easier to ride than those on the other San Juan Islands with lower speed limits.

The island is known for the longstanding custom of waving at every motorist, bicyclist, or pedestrian encountered on the island's roads. In 1996 Paul Allen bought a large Sperry Peninsula site on Lopez Island. The purchase displaced Camp Nor'wester, a summer camp for local children that had been running for 50 years.

== Parks ==
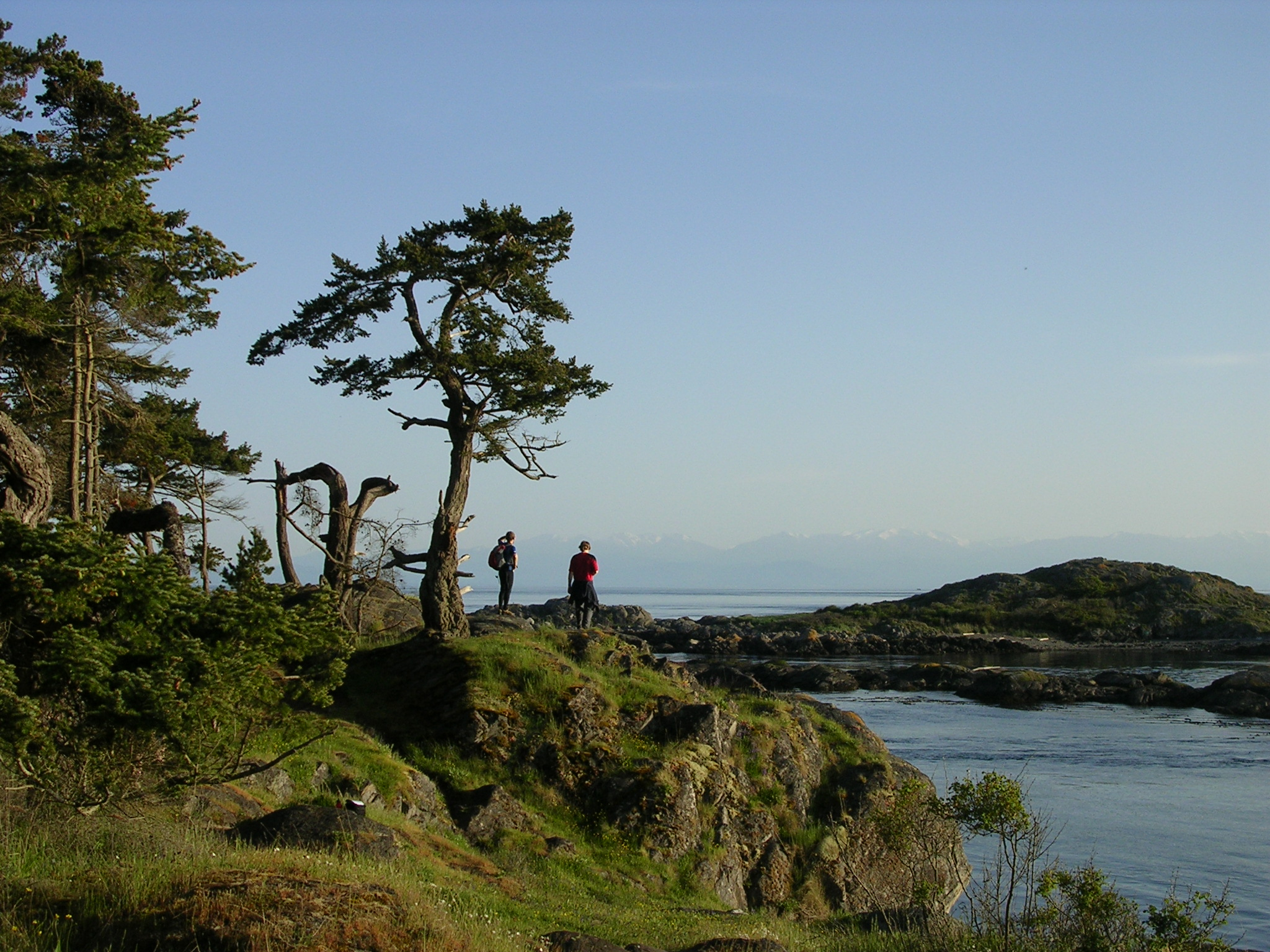
Shark Reef Park

Lopez Island is home to several parks that vary in purpose and geography. Agate Beach County Park, Odlin County Park, and Otis Perkins Day Parks are beach recreation areas and offer picnic amenities. Agate is located on the south end of the island. Odlin, one of the most popular beaches on the island, resides just south of Ferry Landing and offers sites for camping and has a boat launch. The beach at the Otis Perkins day use area is considered as one of the longest beaches in the San Juan Islands.

Two parks offer short hikes. Shark Reef Park offers long views west over San Juan Channel and it includes a half-mile trail through some old-growth trees. Upright Channel Park, a state-operated facility, offers several picnic sites and a hike down to a sandy beach.

The second largest campground on the island is Spencer Spit State Park. The focus of the park, located on the northeast side of the island, is a long, low sandspit that almost connects to small Frost Island just offshore. This 130 acre (53 ha) park has a camping area, picnic sites, and mooring buoys for boats.

== Media ==
- KLOI-LP - local low-power FM radio station based on Lopez Island.
