= Saint Edward State Park =

State park in the U.S. state of Washington

Coordinates: 47°43′49″N 122°15′22″W

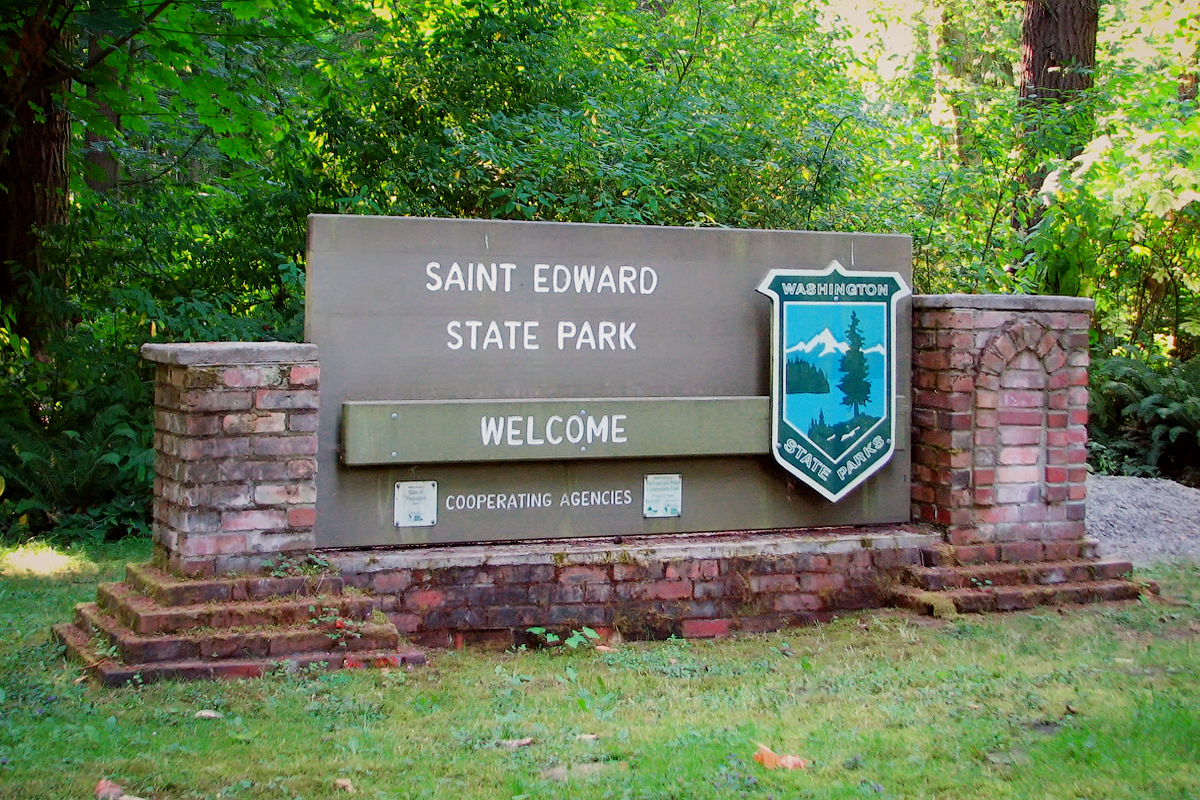
Saint Edward State Park welcome sign

Saint Edward State Park is a 326-acre (132 ha)-park in Kenmore, Washington and Kirkland, Washington. It is part of the Washington State Park System. Before becoming a Catholic seminary and later a state park, the area was logged in the 19th century and again in the 1920s. A series of trails runs through the park for bicyclists and hikers. The forest canopy is primarily made up of the Coast Douglas-fir, western redcedar, bigleaf maple, Pacific madrone and western hemlock. Its dense carpet includes many varieties of fern (mainly western sword fern), shrub and moss. It is flanked on the west by an undeveloped beach on Lake Washington. The park surrounds the Saint Thomas Center, which houses Bastyr University.

== Facilities ==
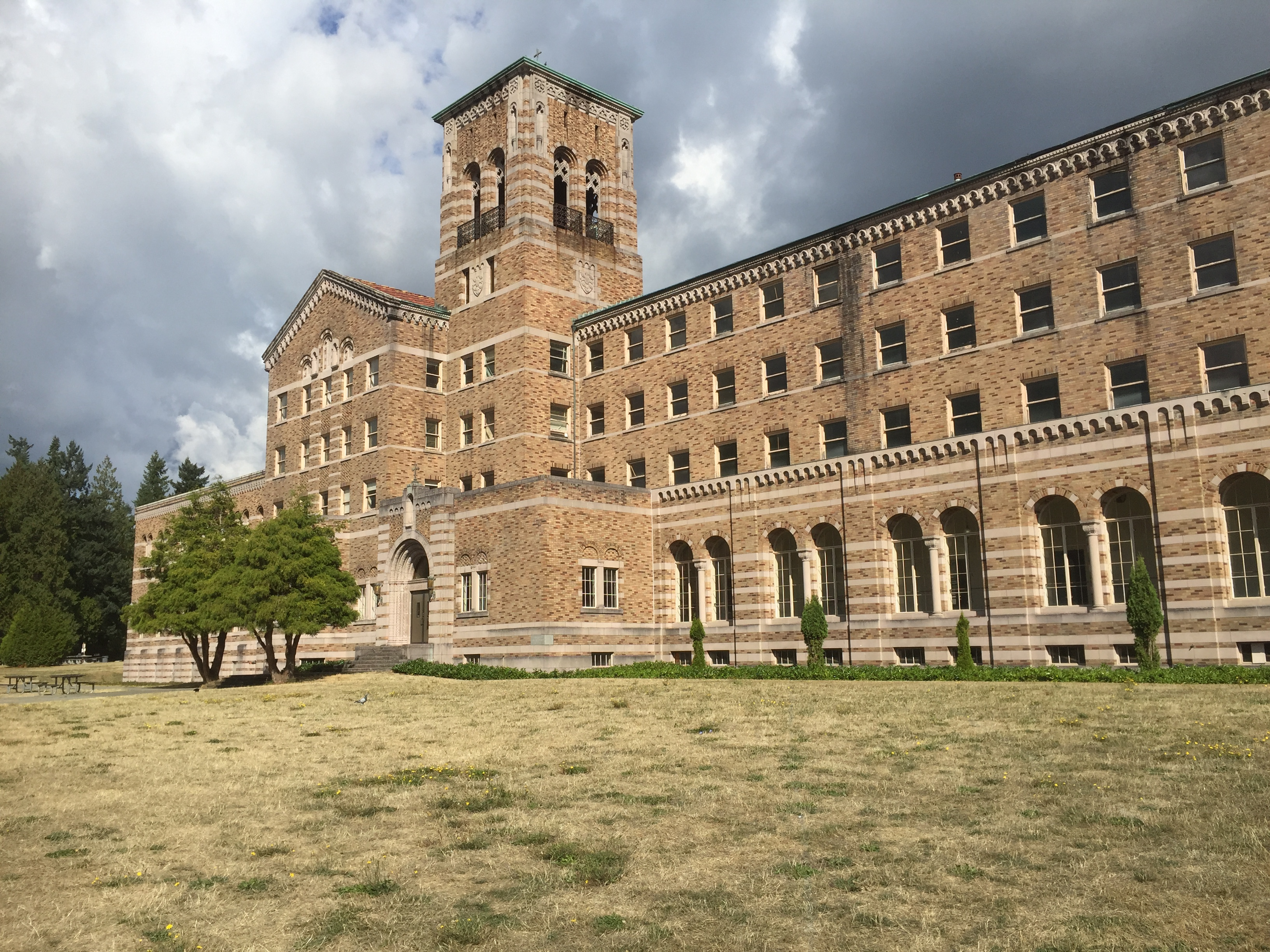
Saint Edward Seminary

=== Saint Edward Seminary ===
The park includes Saint Edward Seminary, listed on the Washington State Heritage Register since 1997 and added in April 2007 to the National Register of Historic Places. This large, historic building fell into disrepair until it was renovated into a hotel.

=== Other facilities ===
Other facilities include the indoor Carole Ann Wald Memorial Pool, which was built in the late 1960s with funding from a seminarian's family and named after the seminarian's sister and donors' daughter. The pool has been operated in recent years by concessionaires and was mothballed December 31, 2009, pending a new operator and/or a greater consortium of support from SESP near-neighbor citizenry, municipalities, and other sponsors.

City of Kenmore, EvergreenHealth, and Bastyr University helped underwrite the CAWM Pool from 2003–2008, but as of 2009, only Evergreen Health and Bastyr University were continuing partners.

The gymnasium and an outdoor stone sanctuary ("the Grotto") both date to the original 1930s construction period. A baseball field and a soccer field lie south of the seminary building.

The park boasts the largest children's playground in the state, built primarily by local volunteers in 2003. It was named one of the top five playgrounds in Washington state in 2009.

The park is day-use only, and no camping is permitted. Dogs are allowed at Saint Edward State Park but state law requires that they be on a physical leash (8 feet (2.4 m) or less) at all times.

== History ==
From the 1920s until 1977, the land on which Saint Edward State Park sits was owned by the Roman Catholic Archdiocese of Seattle. From 1931, it was developed and used for a seminary by the Sulpician Order. The St. Edward Seminary, opened in 1931, was designed by John Graham, Sr., a renowned Seattle architect, and constructed in eight months. The main seminary building was followed in 1958 by the Saint Thomas Seminary and a pool in 1969. Due to declining enrollments, the seminaries closed in 1977. Most of the land was sold in 1977 to the state government, with the support of then-governor Dixy Lee Ray.

The remainder of the land, which includes the Saint Thomas Seminary (now Saint Thomas Center) continued under the ownership of the archdiocese until November 2005, when its tenant, Bastyr University, completed their purchase of the property. The property was also used as a backdrop for several movies and television productions, including Northern Exposure, Singles, and Butterfly Dreaming.

=== Renovation ===
In 2005, Washington State Parks began a land use planning project for the park. Also known as Classification and Management Planning (CAMP), the project addresses overall visitor experiences, natural and cultural resources, use of the park's buildings, recreation fields and trails, and other topics of interest to the community and customers.

A proposal by McMenamins to develop the main building into a hotel, restaurant, and conference center was withdrawn in spring of 2007.

The State Legislature allocated $500,000 to evaluate the declining condition of the seminary building, and $500,000 toward much needed and previously deferred maintenance.

With the newly available injection of funding, State Parks began an RFQ process with architectural firms spring 2007, moving forward toward a timely evaluation, creating an opportunity for a wider array of prospective uses. Bassetti Architects were selected to evaluate and report on the Seminary building.

In 2010, Friends of Saint Edward State Park and Kenmore Heritage Society began working together on the interpretive sign project, drawing on KHS's experience with the Kenmore History Path at Log Boom Park.

In 2017, Daniels Real Estate signed a 62-year lease with Washington State Parks to renovate the main seminary building into a hotel; as part of the deal, Daniels purchased an adjacent waterfront property and transferred it to the state government. It reopened as the Lodge at St. Edwards in May 2021 at a cost of $57 million; the hotel includes 84 guest rooms, event space, a restaurant, and two bars.

== Advocacy groups ==
A local advocacy group, Citizens for Saint Edward State Park, is dedicated to maintaining the park for passive outdoor recreation.

Another citizen group, Saint Edward Environmental Learning Center (SEELC, 2008–2019) dedicated to creating a sustainable future through park preservation, community collaboration, and innovative educational experiences for all ages. The Kenmore Reporter covered SEELC's production of A Midsummer Night's Dream as part of its environmental-education program, which consists of a variety of courses at Saint Edward State Park between spring and fall each year.
