= Bliss Landing =

Coordinates: 50°02′N 124°49′W

Bliss Landing, formerly Bishop Landing or Bishops Landing, was a cannery town on the South Coast of British Columbia, Canada, located on the northwest side of the Malaspina Peninsula on the upper Sunshine Coast, north of the town of Lund and across the mouth of Desolation Sound from Cortes Bay and Manson's Landing on Cortes Island.

Bliss Landing is thought to have been named after an early settler, a Joe Blissto. This replaced an older name for the settlement, Bishop Landing or Bishops Landing. The Bishop Landing Post Office opened on June 1, 1917, and was named after P.W. Bishop, its first postmaster. The post office was redesignated as Bliss Landing on April 1, 1923. The post office closed on April 20, 1960.

== See also ==
- List of canneries in British Columbia
