= Kenmore Air =

Airline of the United States

IATA	ICAO	Call sign
M5	KEN	KENMORE
- Founded: 1946; 80 years ago
- AOC #: United States: GJRA163A; Canada: 949
- Hubs: Kenmore Lake Washington; Seattle Lake Union; Boeing Field; Paine Field; San Juan Islands
- Fleet size: 29
- Destinations: San Juan Islands, Victoria BC, Nanaimo and Desolation Sound BC (seasonal)
- Parent company: Seattle Hospitality Group
- Headquarters: Kenmore Air Harbor; Kenmore, Washington, United States
- Key people: David Gudgel, President
- Website: kenmoreair.com

Kenmore Air Harbor, Inc., doing business as Kenmore Air, is an American airline with its headquarters on the grounds of Kenmore Air Harbor in Kenmore, Washington, United States, north of Seattle. It operates scheduled and charter seaplane and landplane service to destinations throughout western Washington and southwestern British Columbia, as well as seaplane "flightseeing" flights around Seattle. In addition to its corporate headquarters, seaplane maintenance facility and terminal in Kenmore, the airline has hub operations in Seattle for seaplanes at Lake Union Seaplane Base and for land-based airplanes at Boeing Field. It also operates a maintenance facility for its airplane fleet at Boeing Field.

== History ==
=== 1940s ===
The airline was established as Kenmore Air Harbor and started operations on March 21, 1946. It was founded by Robert Munro, Reginald Collins and Jack Mines and began operations with a single Aeronca Model K seaplane and a hangar at a location formerly occupied by a lumber mill on north Lake Washington. The airline is still at its original location. After a short-term partnership Munro continued alone with the company until his death in October 2000.

The company was originally named Mines Collins Munro but was changed to the current name Kenmore Air a few months later to reflect its ties to the town of Kenmore, Washington where its operations were located both then and now. After beginning operations with its Aeronca Model K, it purchased three more aircraft a few weeks later.

Kenmore Air originally made its money by accessing remote and sometimes dangerous locations during its early years. In July 1946, pilot Jack Mines was killed while flying supplies to a search and rescue team in the nearby Cascade mountains; as a result, Collins and Munro became the two owners of Kenmore Air. Munro soon became the sole owner of Kenmore Air when Collins moved to California after accepting a job there.

From the start, Kenmore Air's seaplane maintenance and restoration service was an important part of the company. In the late-1940s, Kenmore Air became a Republic Seabee dealer for the Northwest and this became a success for Kenmore Air. At one point, 40 Seabees were based at Kenmore Air Harbor, though Kenmore Air themselves owned just one of these amphibian aircraft. Kenmore became experts in maintenance and repair of the aircraft and developed several modifications to improve the aircraft's performance. Kenmore Air also became an official aircraft and parts dealer for Cessna by the end of the 1950s, further expanding its aircraft maintenance business.

=== 1950s ===
In the 1950s, Kenmore Air began its charter business by offering flights to fishing and hunting spots in the Pacific Northwest. Kenmore Air also leased an aircraft to the US government for survey flights in Alaska. This led to a series of contracts with the US Navy which continues today. In 1953, a Canadian mining company hired Kenmore to help fly in equipment and tools to build a mining camp on Leduc Glacier, fifty miles north of Ketchikan, Alaska. Kenmore Air used two Noorduyn Norseman and a Seabed to fly in equipment over a two-month period. The aircraft flew in several pieces of large equipment to the glacier, including diesel engines, railroad cars, and tractors.

=== 1960s ===
In the 1960s, Kenmore Air expanded its maintenance services to include the de Havilland Canada DHC-2 Beaver seaplane. They purchased their first Beaver in 1963 and the Beaver soon became a centerpiece of Kenmore Air's fleet, and they created a rebuilding and modification program around the seven-passenger aircraft. After the Beaver ceased production in 1967, Kenmore Air began to establish itself as a leading refurbisher of the seaplane. They modified and rebuilt Beavers to such an extent that such aircraft modified by the company has become known as "Kenmore Beavers" by the global aviation community. Kenmore Air has rebuilt a total of 125 Beavers since then. To accommodate their expansion, the company built a new hangar and office building during the 1960s.

=== 1970s ===
In the early 1970s, in a contract with the US Navy, Kenmore Air transported unarmed torpedoes to a joint US-Canadian testing facility near Vancouver Island. For five years during this decade, Kenmore Air transported scientists and supplies for the U.S. Geological Survey to a glacier in the North Cascade Mountains, South Cascade Glacier, in which the seaplanes had to take off and land on a glacier 6,500 feet above sea level. The airline also expanded its charter service in the 1970s, offering round-trip flights to fishing resorts in British Columbia.

=== 1980s ===
In the mid-1980s Kenmore Air purchased Otter Air, an airline that offered seaplane service from Seattle to Victoria, BC. The Seattle-Victoria route was operated for two years before it was sold to its competitor Lake Union Air in 1988. Kenmore Air also added two Turbine Beavers (a Beaver manufactured with a PT-6 Engine, 60 of which were made by de Havilland) in the late 1980s and purchased its main competitor Lake Union Air in 1992. With this purchase, Kenmore Air acquired a seaplane terminal on Lake Union. They converted one of Lake Union Air's de Havilland Canada DHC-3 Otters into a Turbine Otter and later purchased several more Turbine Otters.

=== 1990s ===
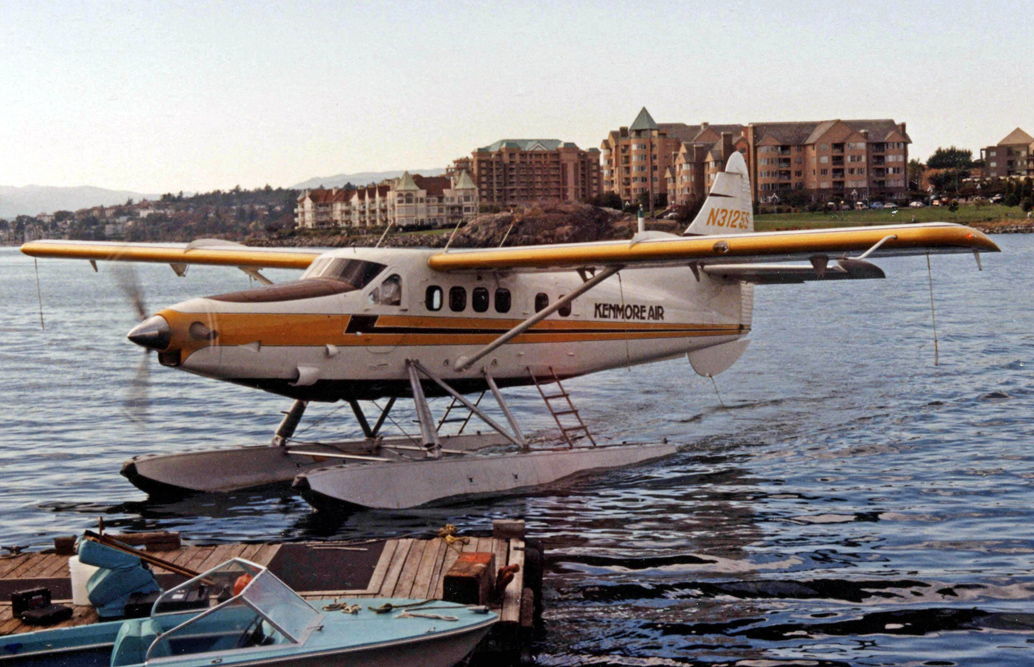
Kenmore Air DHC-3T Turbine Otter N3125S arriving at Victoria Harbor in 1998

Kenmore Air acquired Lake Union Air Service in 1993; in 1997 it planned to begin operating service from Elliott Bay, a body of water on Puget Sound where Seattle's downtown waterfront is located. In 1998, Kenmore Air gained a federal permit allowing them to begin operations there, pending approval from Seattle's city council. The company later abandoned its plans in fall 1999 after encountering resistance from members of the local community.

=== 2000s ===
In October 2000, Robert Munro, the company's founder, and owner, died at age 83 after an extended illness. Ownership was passed to Munro's son, Gregg Munro, while several other family members also held management positions at Kenmore Air.

=== 2010s ===
Residents in both Seattle near their Lake Union seaport and in Victoria have been growing increasingly concerned about noise and safety on the water. In Sept 2011, the James Bay Neighborhood Association in Victoria, BC commissioned a report that calls for "serious restrictions on seaplane businesses" (which include other services like helicopters). Kenmore Air has responded by encouraging their pilots to follow limited flight paths in Seattle In 2013 when new high rise condos were proposed by Vulcan in South Lake Union neighborhood, Kenmore requested that an easement be placed on new residents to prevent them from filing noise complaints.

=== 2018 ===
Kenmore Air and Harbour Air started a new seaplane service between Downtown Vancouver, BC and Downtown Seattle, WA on April 26, 2018. The service was suspended by Kenmore and Harbour air after the COVID-19 pandemic caused international travel to become inaccessible. Kenmore Air has resumed scheduled service to Vancouver.

=== 2023 ===
Kenmore Air Express began twice daily service from Friday Harbor to Victoria International Airport in the city of Sidney. The flight is operated on Kenmore's Cessna 208B Caravan. The flight departs and arrives into the Friday Harbor airport with options to connect through to both Boeing Field and Paine Field.

== Destinations ==
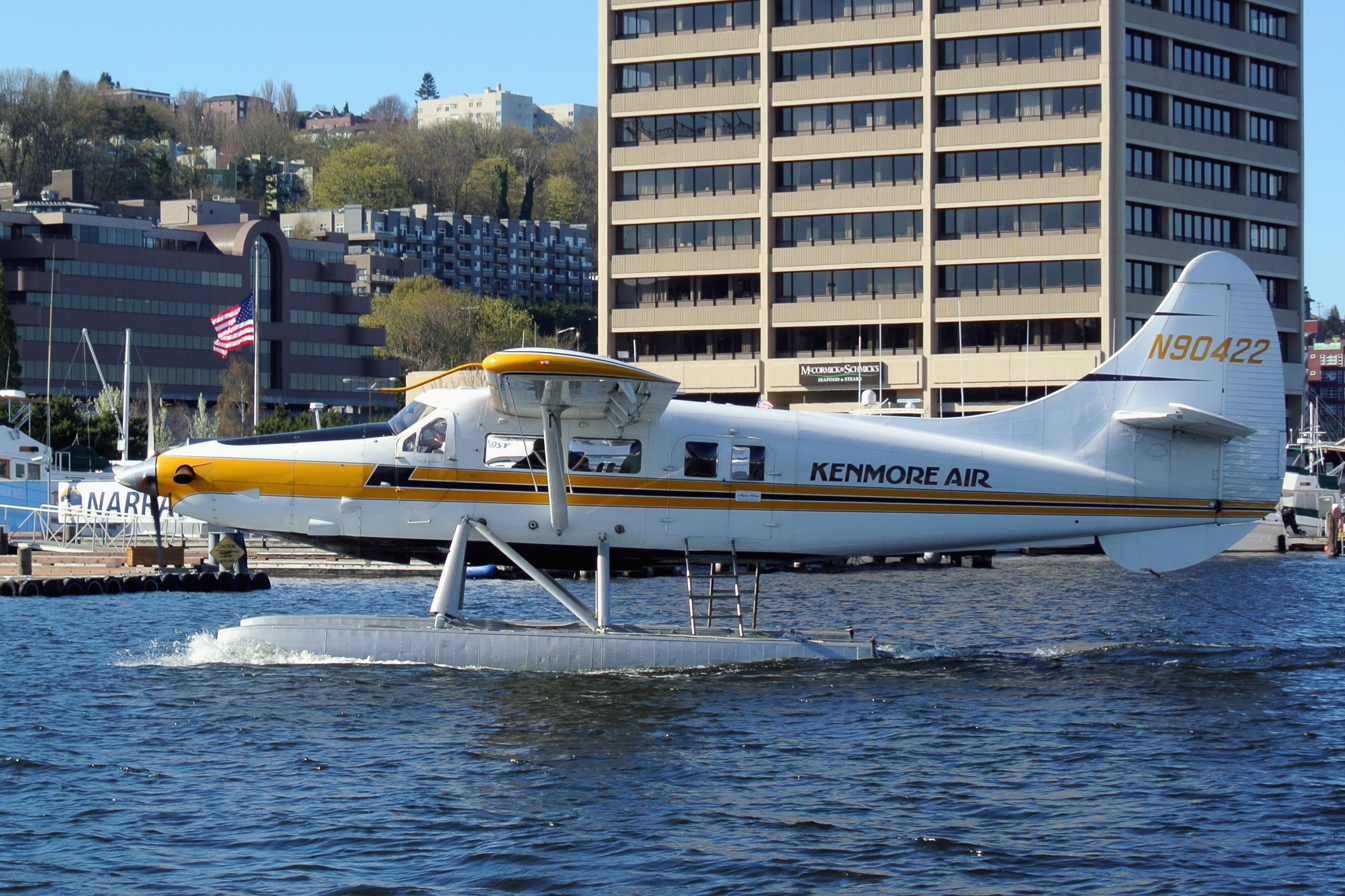
DHC-3 Otter on Lake Union, Seattle, WA

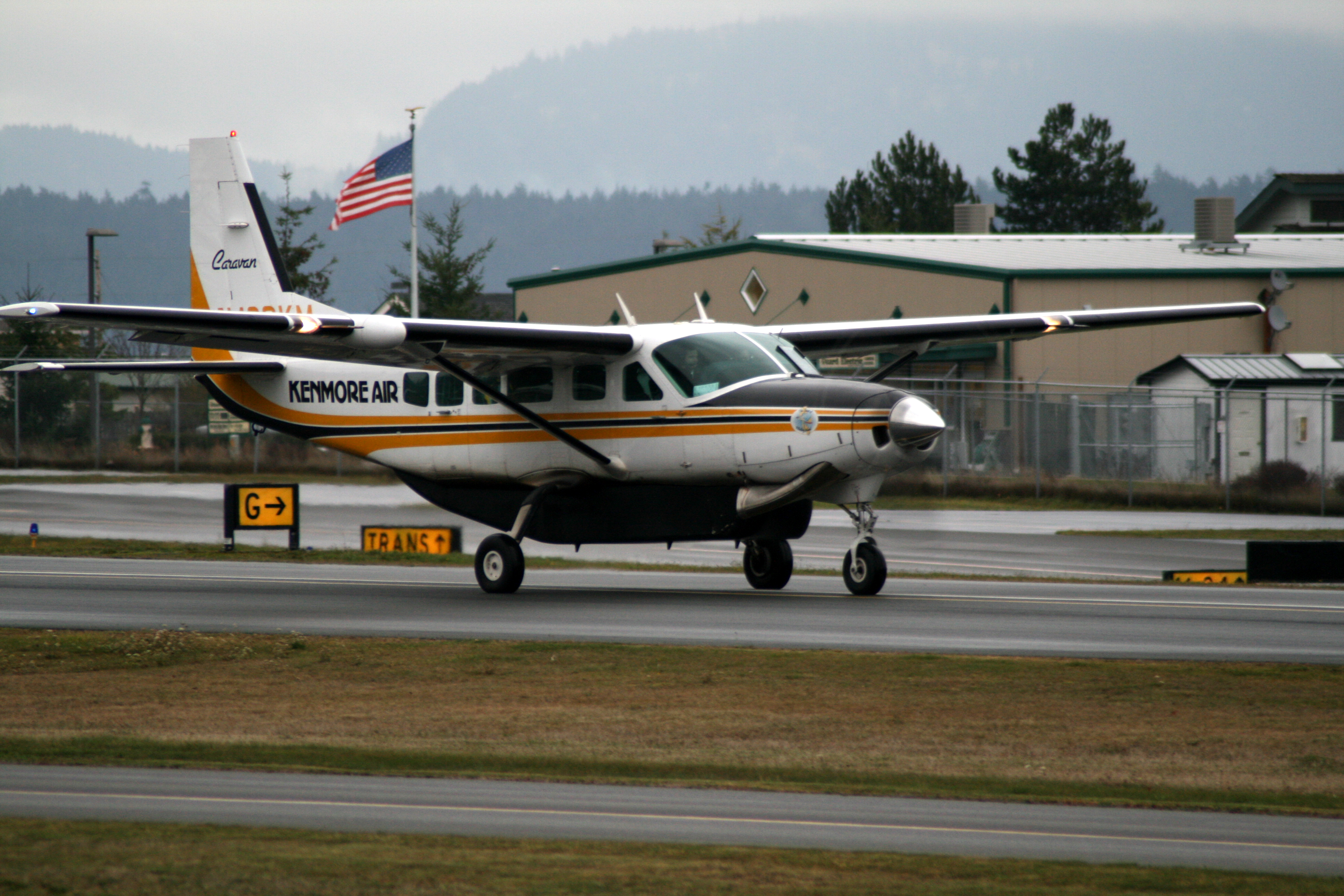
Kenmore Air Express Cessna 208 Caravan

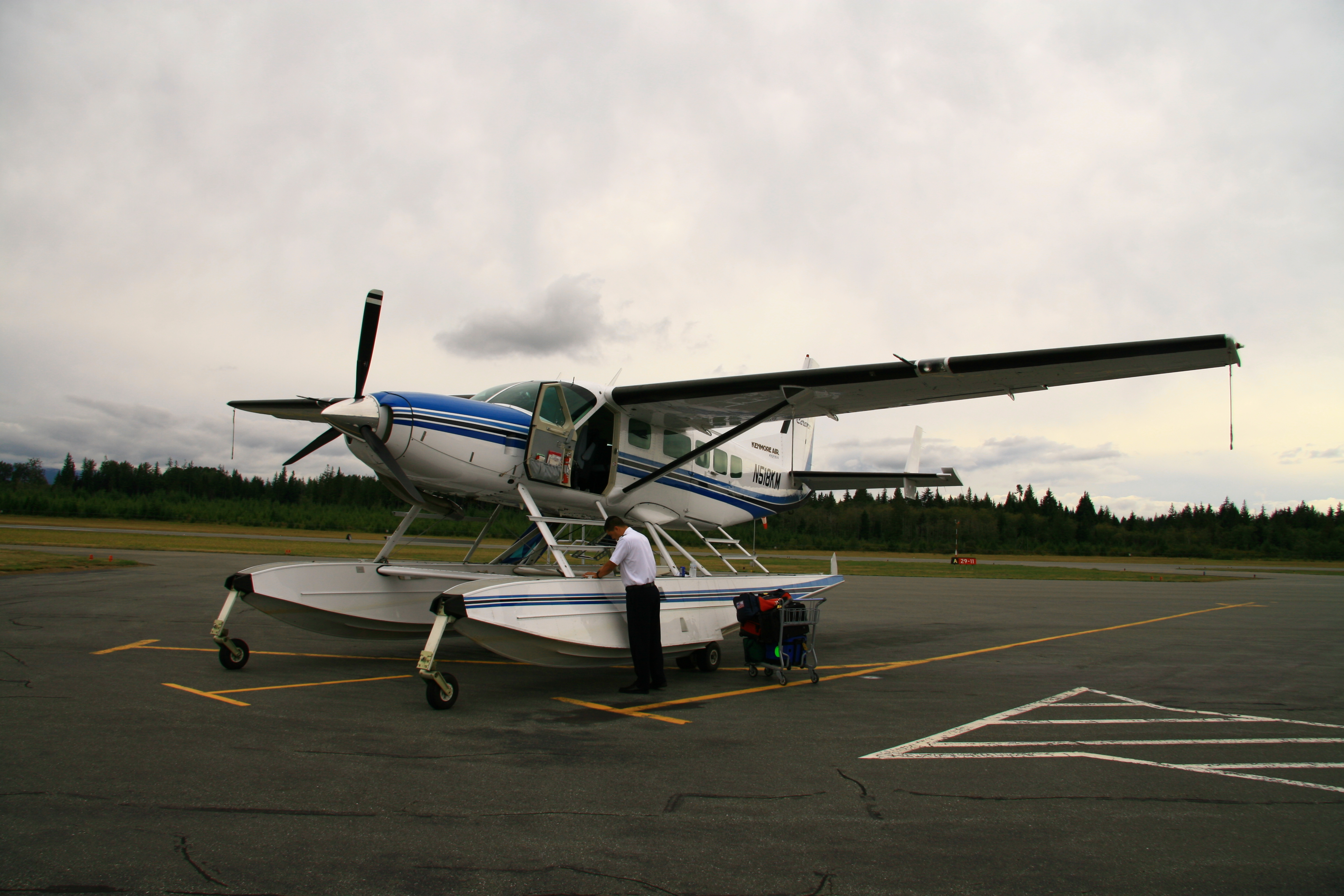
A Cessna 208 in Campbell River

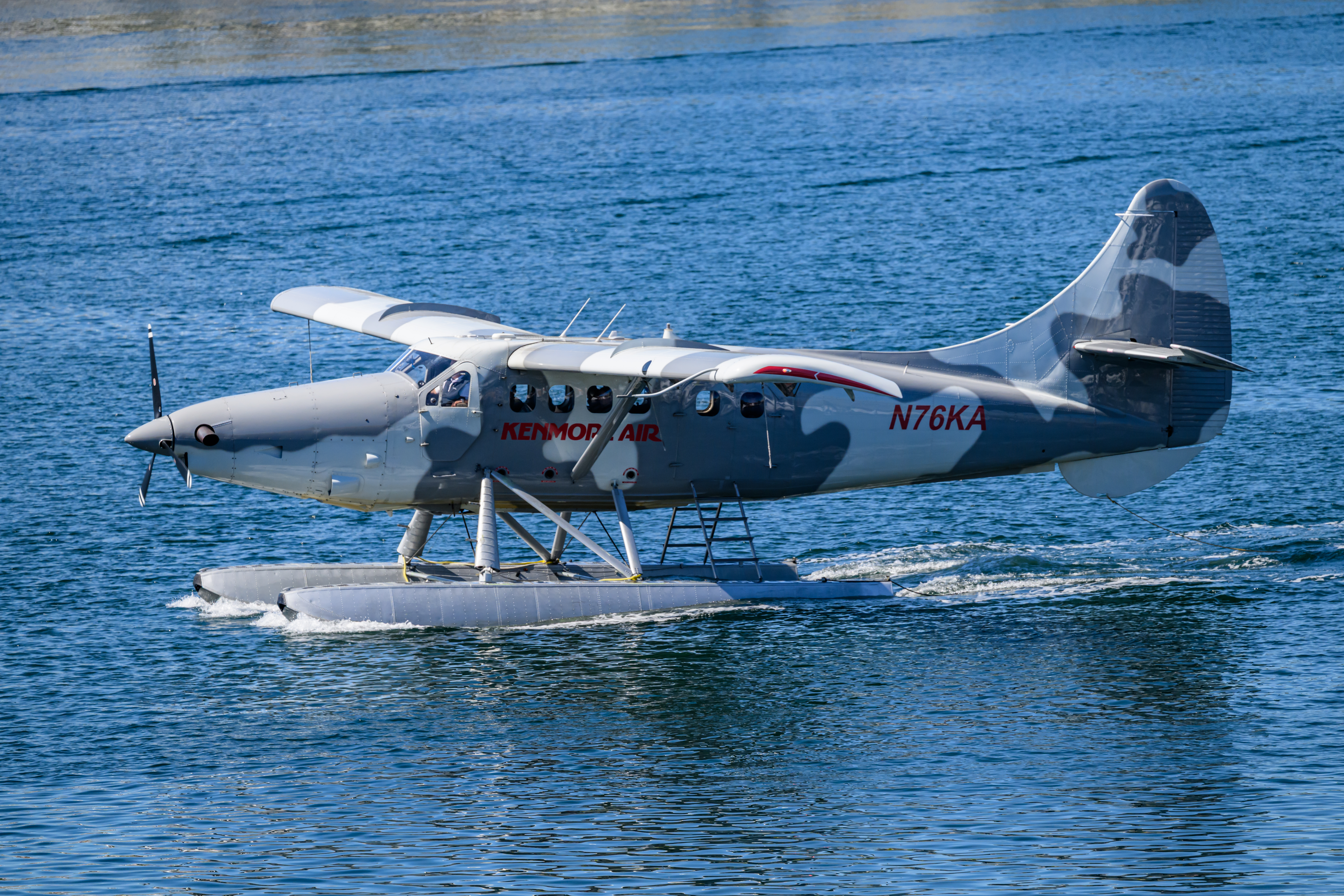
Kenmore Air De Havilland Canada DHC-3T Otter N76KA on inbound taxi at Victoria Harbor, BC Canada

Daily, year-round seaplane service is provided from Seattle's Lake Union to Lopez Island, Orcas Island and San Juan Island in Washington State, as well as to Victoria, BC and Vancouver, BC. Seasonally (May–September), daily seaplane service is provided from Kenmore Air Harbor to more than 30 destinations in British Columbia, including Big Bay, Cortes Island, Desolation Sound, Nanaimo, Port McNeill, Quadra Island, the Sechelt Peninsula, Sonora Island, and Refuge Cove.

In January 2014, Kenmore Air announced a regular commercial service between Nanaimo Airport and Boeing Field in Seattle, with a free shuttle between Boeing Field and Sea-Tac. The service started March 3, 2014, but was discontinued on May 4, 2015, due to low passenger numbers.

Kenmore Air Express provides daily, year-round service to the Washington communities of Eastsound and Friday Harbor. Service to Port Angeles was discontinued in November 2014.

== Fleet ==
As of September 2021, the Kenmore Air fleet contains 26 aircraft.

Kenmore Air fleet
Aircraft	In service	Passengers	Notes
DHC-2 Beaver	4	5	
DHC-2 Turbine Beaver	3	6	
DHC-3 Turbine Otter	10	10	
Cessna 180	1	2	Used primarily (but not exclusively) for charters
Cessna 208 Caravan	1	8	Equipped with wheels and operated under Kenmore Air Express Brand
Cessna 208 Grand Caravan	3	9	Equipped with wheels and operated under Kenmore Air Express Brand
Cessna 172	2	2	Used in flight instruction department for seaplane rating certificates
Piper PA-18 Super Cub	2	2	Used in flight instruction department for seaplane rating certificates
Pilatus PC-12	2	8	Used for charters only, or to supplement Kenmore Air Express service when all Caravans become unavailable.
Total	28		

== Incidents and accidents ==
- October 1, 1977: A Kenmore Air DHC-2 Beaver crashed after colliding with terrain near Stevens Pass, Washington, killing all seven occupants. The aircraft crashed while heading to Lake Hatheume, British Columbia, after departing from Kenmore, Washington. The incident marked Kenmore Air's first fatal crash in over 36 years of operation. The crash, attributed to the overloading the aircraft's payload capacity and the aircraft's inability to climb above the rising terrain. Originally written off as damaged beyond repair, the DHC-2 Beaver, registered as N64391, was restored, and reregistered as N62357.
- June 11, 1979: A Kenmore Air DHC-2 Beaver was damaged after it crashed at sea near Maurelle Island, British Columbia, killing the sole occupant. The aircraft, registered N68084, was later recovered, repaired and reregistered as N72TT.
- October 1, 1999: Exactly 22 years after the first Kenmore Air fatal accident, a Kenmore Air DHC-2 Beaver crashed in a wooded area near Port Blakely, Washington. The aircraft, registered as N9766Z, was carrying four passengers, all members of a BBC film crew. The pilot and four passengers all received minor injuries, and the aircraft returned to service. The cause of the accident was attributed to the pilot's failure to maintain proper clearance above the trees and terrain.
- September 30, 2016: After departing from Seattle's South Lake Union a Kenmore Air DHC-2 Beaver crashed in the waters near San Juan Islands at approximately 8:50 a.m. A husband and wife in a pleasure boat, the Northern Rose, were able to make it to the crash scene and pulled one woman and three men on board from the water. All four victims were treated for minor injuries and hypothermia and discharged.
- March 23, 2022: On Orcas Island, a Kenmore Air 1998 Cessna Caravan 208B experienced a mechanical power failure during takeoff and failed to gain altitude. The plane continued to drive off the runway through a fence and ended up in a field. No injuries were reported. The aircraft was repaired and returned to service.
- July 23, 2026: Kenmore Air Flight 140 originating from Lake Union, Seattle and operated by a DHC-3 Otter Seaplane, crash landed and caught fire at Shallow Bay near Sucia Island en route to Roche Harbor Airport. The flight carried 10 passengers and one pilot, all of whom survived.

== See also ==
- List of seaplane operators
