= National Register of Historic Places listings in San Juan County, Washington =

Location of San Juan County in Washington

This list presents the full set of buildings, structures, objects, sites, or districts designated on the National Register of Historic Places in San Juan County, Washington, and offers brief descriptive information about each of them. The National Register recognizes places of national, state, or local historic significance across the United States. Out of over 90,000 National Register sites nationwide, Washington is home to approximately 1,500, and 19 of those are found in San Juan County.

This National Park Service list is complete through NPS recent listings posted August 21, 2026.

== Current listings ==
	Name on the Register	Image	Date listed	Location	City or town	Description
1	Alderbrook Farmhouse	Alderbrook Farmhouse	November 21, 1985 (#85002919)	Point Lawrence Rd. 48°39′20″N 122°45′47″W	Doe Bay	
2	Center School	Center School	May 9, 2022 (#100007711)	452 Richardson Rd. 48°28′03″N 122°54′11″W	Lopez Island	Built in 1903 by Joe and John Burt. Served as a school until 1941. Since the mid 40's it has been known as Lopez Island Grange #1060 and maintained by the membership.
3	Crow Valley School	Crow Valley School	August 27, 1987 (#87001457)	Crow Valley Rd. 48°40′04″N 122°56′42″W	Eastsound	Built in 1888 in Eastsound. Now maintained by the Orcas Island Historical Museum. Rural Public Schools of Washington State MPS
4	Doe Bay General Store and Post Office	Doe Bay General Store and Post Office	May 8, 1986 (#86001017)	End of County Rd. 48°38′29″N 122°46′45″W	Doe Bay, Orcas Island	
5	Michael and Myra Donohue House	Michael and Myra Donohue House	January 9, 2013 (#12001161)	1159 N. Beach Rd. 48°42′20″N 122°54′24″W	Eastsound	
6	Emmanuel Episcopal Church	Emmanuel Episcopal Church	December 12, 1994 (#94001431)	Main St. 48°41′40″N 122°54′22″W	Eastsound	Built in 1885.
7	Krumdiack Homestead		April 29, 1993 (#93000367)	North coast, between Fishery Pt. and Pt. Hammond; 48°43′03″N 123°01′20″W	Waldron Island	Also known as the Cook Property.
8	Little Red Schoolhouse	Little Red Schoolhouse	June 19, 1973 (#73001886)	Corner of Hoffman Cove and Neck Point Cove Rd. 48°34′22″N 122°57′43″W	Shaw Island	
9	Moran State Park	Moran State Park	January 2, 2013 (#12001140)	3572 Olga Road; 48°38′58″N 122°50′31″W	Olga	
10	Orcas Hotel	Orcas Hotel	August 24, 1982 (#82004284)	In Orcas; 48°35′54″N 122°56′37″W	Orcas	Built in 1904.
11	Patos Island Light Station	Patos Island Light Station	October 21, 1977 (#77001355)	North of Eastsound on Patos Island; 48°47′21″N 122°58′11″W	Eastsound	Built in 1893.
12	Port Stanley School	Port Stanley School	December 9, 1994 (#94001437)	Port Stanley Rd. 48°31′32″N 122°52′35″W	Lopez Island	
13	Roche Harbor	Roche Harbor	August 29, 1977 (#77001356)	Northern San Juan Island; 48°36′32″N 123°09′01″W	San Juan Island	Founded in 1886, the district consists of 1,400 acres (5.7 km^{2}) and 17 buildings.
14	Rosario	Rosario	November 2, 1978 (#78002772)	South of East Sound on Orcas Island; 48°38′49″N 122°52′21″W	Orcas Island	Adjacent to Moran State Park.
15	San Juan County Courthouse	San Juan County Courthouse	April 12, 1984 (#84003603)	350 N. Court St. 48°32′09″N 123°01′01″W	Friday Harbor	Built in 1906.
16	San Juan Island National Historic Site	San Juan Island National Historic Site	October 15, 1966 (#66000369)	Between Haro Strait and San Juan Channel; 48°34′57″N 123°09′01″W	Friday Harbor	
17	San Juan Island, Lime Kiln Light Station	San Juan Island, Lime Kiln Light Station	December 15, 1978 (#78002771)	West of Friday Harbor on CR 1; 48°30′56″N 123°09′00″W	Friday Harbor	Built in 1914.
18	San Juan Lime Company/Cowell's	San Juan Lime Company/Cowell's	March 6, 2007 (#07000136)	1567 West Side Rd. N 48°31′10″N 123°09′05″W	Friday Harbor	
19	Tharald Homestead		January 17, 2002 (#01001473)	Hoffman Cove Rd. 48°33′40″N 122°58′03″W	Shaw Island	Also known as the Ellis Farm.

== Former listings ==
	Name on the Register	Image	Date listed	Date removed	Location	City or town	Description
1	Richardson General Store and Warehouse		November 21, 1985 (#85002918)	November 14, 1990	Richardson Rd.	Richardson (Lopez Island)	Destroyed by fire on October 27, 1990.

== See also ==
- National Register of Historic Places listings in Washington state
- Listings in neighboring counties: Clallam, Island, Jefferson, Skagit, Whatcom
- List of National Historic Landmarks in Washington (state)
- Historic preservation
- History of Washington (state)
- Index of Washington (state)-related articles
