= Henry Cayou =

Coast Salish businessman and politician (1869 - 1959)

Member of the Washington House of Representatives for the 40th district
- In office 1940–1942

County Commissioner for San Juan County, Washington
- In office 1906–1935

Personal details
- Born: 1865 Orcas Island, Washington
- Died: March 31, 1959 (aged 93–94) Bellingham, Washington
- Party: Republican
- Occupation: Politician, entrepreneur, fisherman

Henry Cayou (c. 1869 - March 31, 1959) was a Coast Salish businessman and politician who was one of the first Native elected officials in Washington state. He was a County Commissioner for San Juan County for 29 years and served one term in the Washington House of Representatives.

== Life ==
Cayou was born on Orcas Island, one of Washington's San Juan Islands, in 1869. His mother was Native American, from the unrecognized Mitchell Bay Band (a community of Northern Straits Salish speakers), and his father was of French descent. He was born into a large family with ten siblings in the household growing up. Growing up, Cayou immersed himself in both Native culture and the broader Orcas Island community, playing baseball for a Native team and becoming a successful entrepreneur. He started his career as a fisherman but quickly expanded, investing in a fleet of boats and running a large commercial operation including a cannery at Deer Harbor and a boat building enterprise on Decatur Island.

Cayou first entered politics in 1897 as a road supervisor. In 1901 he became the local agent for the Chemawa Indian School. In 1902, he was made postmaster of Decatur Island. In 1906, he won election to the San Juan County Board of Commissioners, a position he would hold for 29 years. He won election handily with a plurality of the vote. At the time of his election, Native people did not have a guaranteed right to vote. In 1928, Cayou launched a campaign for the Washington House of Representatives. He lost the election with 388 votes to his opponent's 490. He ran for the House again in 1938, citing opposition to increased taxes as his reason for entering the race, and lost in the general election. 1940 marked his third attempt at entering the house. He won election along with fellow Republican Grant Sisson in an election decided by absentee ballots. He lost reelection in 1942 to Democrat Violet Boede in another close race.

Cayou was involved in multiple near-death experiences during his life. On December 25, 1895, he and his family were involved in a capsize off the coast of Orcas Island and had to be rescued. On March 6, 1911, he suffered a skull fracture in an freak explosion when he accidentally caused a spark close to an open can of gasoline. He died on March 31, 1959, in Bellingham, Washington.

== Legacy ==
In 2021, a proposal to rename a channel between Orcas and Shaw islands after Cayou was submitted to the Washington State Board on Geographic Names. At the time of the proposal, the channel was named "Harney Channel" after William S. Harney, a general in the United States Army who led multiple massacres of Native people during his career, including one instance where he engaged in fake peace talks to gain the community's trust. Even during his time, Harney was described by newspapers as a "monster." On July 5, 2022, the Board unanimously approved the proposal, attributing its success to "a substantial community organizing effort from San Juan County residents."
