= Doe Bay, Washington =

Unincorporated community in San Juan County, Washington

- Unincorporated community
- Location within Washington (state) Location within the United States
- Coordinates: 48°38′28″N 122°46′52″W
- Country: United States
- State: Washington
- County: San Juan
- First Settled: 1870s
- Elevation: 30 ft (9.1 m)
- Time zone: UTC-8 (Pacific (PST))
  - Summer (DST): UTC-7 (PDT)
- GNIS feature ID: 1511639

Doe Bay, Washington is a small unincorporated community in San Juan County, Washington, United States. Doe Bay sits on the south-eastern shore of Orcas Island.

Doe Bay is about 19.1 miles (30.7 km) by road from Orcas Village, about 11 miles (18 km) by road from Eastsound, and a short 3.6 miles (5.8 km) from Olga.

Deer Harbor, a community on the opposite side of the island from Doe Bay, is about 20.6 miles (33.2 km) by road. It is also very near Moran State Park. It hosts an annual music festival.

== History ==
=== Pre-European history ===
Before the arrival of the European settlers, the area was a traditional sanctuary for various Coast Salish tribes.

=== Recent history ===
In the early 1870s, John Gottleib Viereck (a migrant of German origins), Jennie Kahlan (a woman of Tsimishian origins), alongside their seven children settled the area of what is today known as Doe Bay. Many immigrants soon followed them, seeing the prospect of limited governance in the area as a promising characteristic.

The settlement grew between 1890 and 1910 with the appearance of many orchards and farms in the area, and in 1908, the local post office was created.

Up until 1914, the entirety of Orcas, including Doe Bay, grew as an agricultural hub, and thus structured themselves around an agricultural economy, however, World War I stopped sales of U.S. fruit to foreign markets, thus heavily damaging the local economy, reducing the local active farms.

Starting from 1922, Doe Bay became a touristic hub, changing its economy once again, using the proximity to natural highlights such as the Moran State Park to boost its tourism. This has been the policy that the community has used for the last few decades.
