= Obstruction Pass State Park =

State park in Washington (state), United States

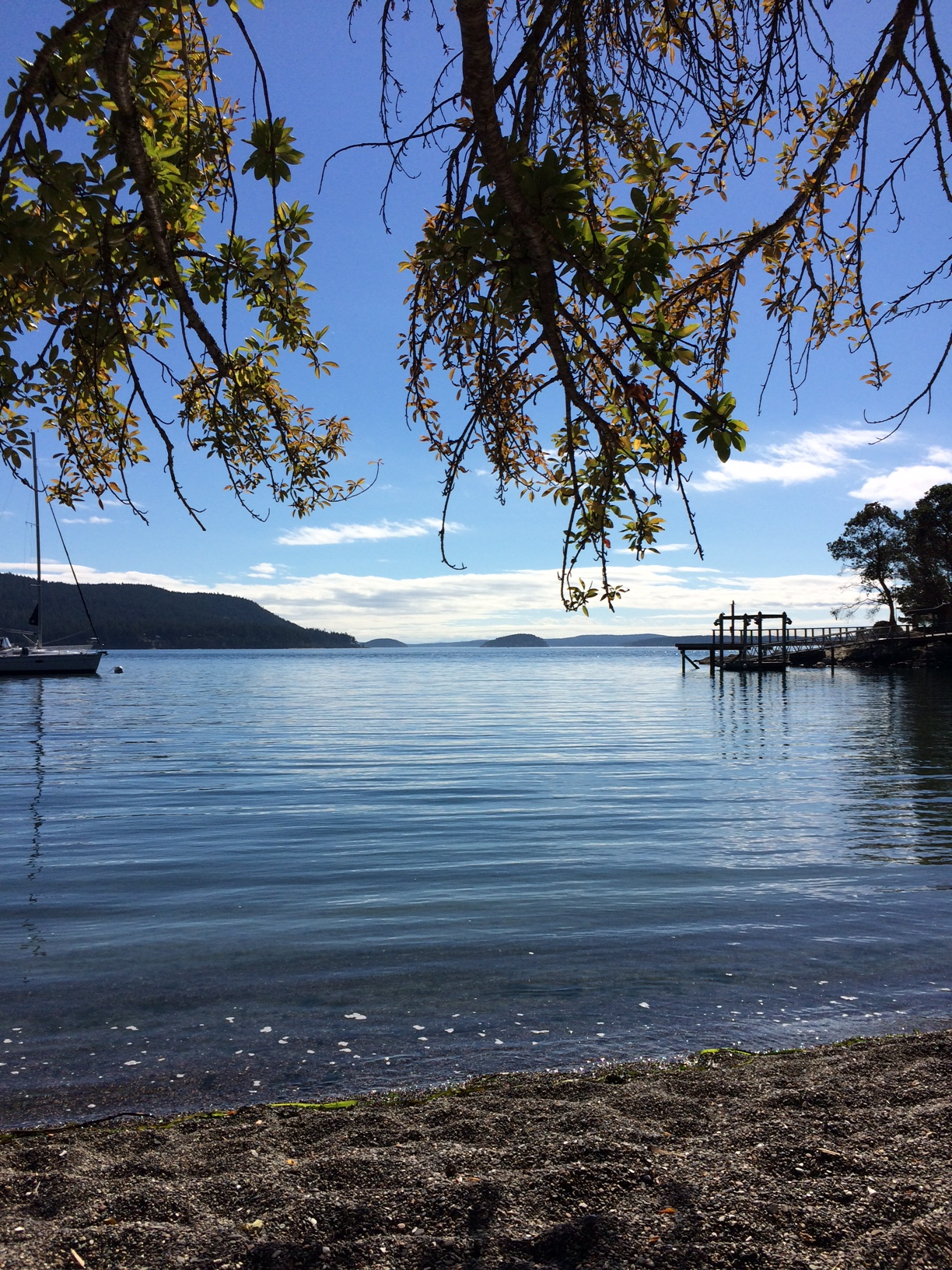
- Obstruction Pass State Park, September 2016

- Location within Washington (state) Location within the United States
- Location: San Juan County, Washington, United States
- Coordinates: 48°36′19″N 122°49′39″W
- Area: 76 acres (31 ha)
- Established: 2002
- Administrator: Washington State Parks and Recreation Commission
- Visitors: 57,020 (in 2024)
- Website: Official website

Obstruction Pass State Park is a public recreation area occupying 76 acres (31 ha) one mile southeast of Olga at the southern end of Orcas Island in San Juan County, Washington. Park activities include picnicking, fishing, crabbing, beachcombing, bird watching, and hiking on a zero-point-six-mile (0.97 km) trail. The campground has nine tent spaces, one of which is reserved for kayakers on the Cascadia Marine Trail.
