= Violet P. Boede =

American politician

Member of the Washington House of Representatives San Juan County, Washington
- In office 1934–1950

Personal details
- Born: Amy Violet Paxson c. March 6, 1892 Friday Harbor, Washington
- Died: June 4, 1964 (aged 72)
- Resting place: Woodlawn Cemetery, Orcas Island, Washington

Violet P. Boede was a state legislator from Orcas Island, Washington. A Democrat, she represented the 40th district (San Juan County) in the Washington House of Representatives for six terms from 1934 to 1950. She died in 1964, at which time she was living in Eastsound. A tribute was given for her in 1965.
