= West Sound =

West Sound may refer to:

- West Sound, Washington, an unincorporated community on Orcas Island in the U.S. state of Washington
- Westsound/WSX Seaplane Base, a seaplane base adjacent to West Sound, Washington
- Greatest Hits Radio, which was previously known in Scotland as West Sound
