= Westsound/WSX Seaplane Base =

Westsound Seaplane Base
- IATA: WSX; ICAO: none; FAA LID: WA83

Summary
- Airport type: Private
- Owner: Westsound Marina
- Serves: West Sound, Washington
- Elevation AMSL: 0 ft / 0 m
- Coordinates: 48°37′05″N 122°57′24″W

Map
- Location of airport in Washington WSX (the United States)

Runways
Direction	Length		Surface
Direction	ft	m	Surface
10/28	4,000	1,219	Water
18/36	5,000	1,524	Water
- Source: Federal Aviation Administration

Westsound Seaplane Base (SPB) (IATA: WSX, FAA LID: WA83) is a seaplane base located adjacent to West Sound on Orcas Island in San Juan County, Washington, United States. It is owned by the Westsound Marina.

== Facilities ==
Westsound Seaplane Base has two seaplane landing areas: 10/28 is 4,000 by 500 feet (1,219 x 152 m) and 18/36 is 5,000 by 500 feet (1,524 x 152 m).

== Airlines and destinations ==
Airlines	Destinations
Kenmore Air	Seattle–Lake Union

== See also ==
- List of airports in Washington
