= Argyle, Washington =

Unincorporated community in San Juan County, Washington

- Unincorporated community
- Location within Washington (state) Location within the United States
- Coordinates: 48°30′52″N 123°01′11″W
- Country: United States
- State: Washington
- County: San Juan
- Established: 1886
- Elevation: 23 ft (7.0 m)
- Time zone: UTC-8 (Pacific (PST))
  - Summer (DST): UTC-7 (PDT)
- GNIS feature ID: 1510786

Argyle is an unincorporated community in San Juan County, in the U.S. state of Washington.

== History ==
A post office called Argyle was established in 1886, and remained in operation until 1912. In 1887, the Postmaster was Robert Lyall with yearly salary of $77.80 The origin of the name Argyle is uncertain.
