= Mount Constitution =

Mountain in Washington (state), United States

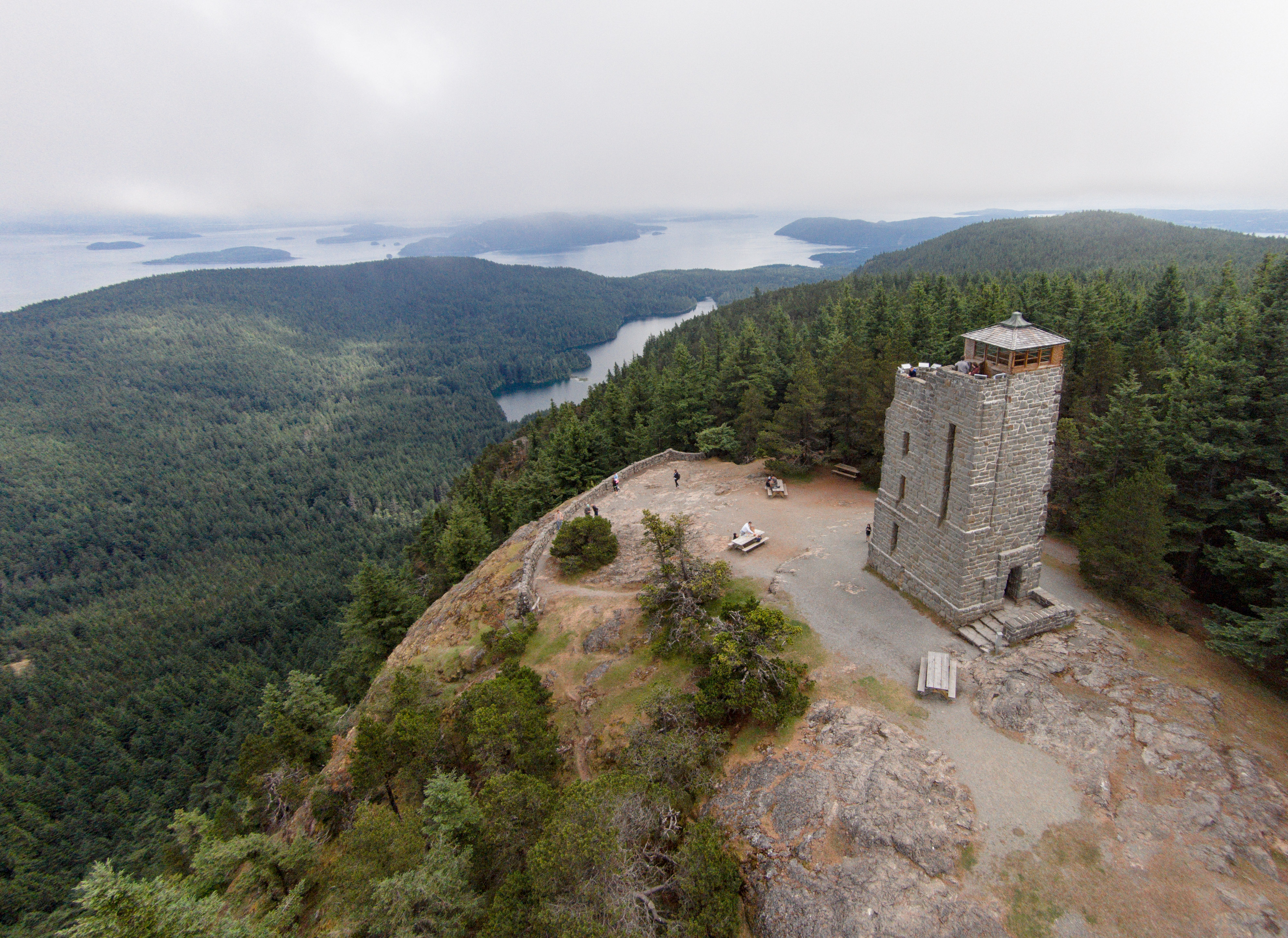
- The observation tower at the peak of Mt. Constitution as seen from an unmanned aerial vehicle

Highest point
- Elevation: 2,409 ft (734 m) NAVD 88
- Prominence: 2,409 ft (734 m)
- Coordinates: 48°40′39″N 122°49′52″W

Geography
- Location: Orcas Island, San Juan County, Washington, U.S.

Mount Constitution is a mountain on Orcas Island, the highest point in the San Juan Islands and the second highest mountain on an ocean island in the contiguous 48 states. Only Devils Peak in the Channel Islands of California is higher.

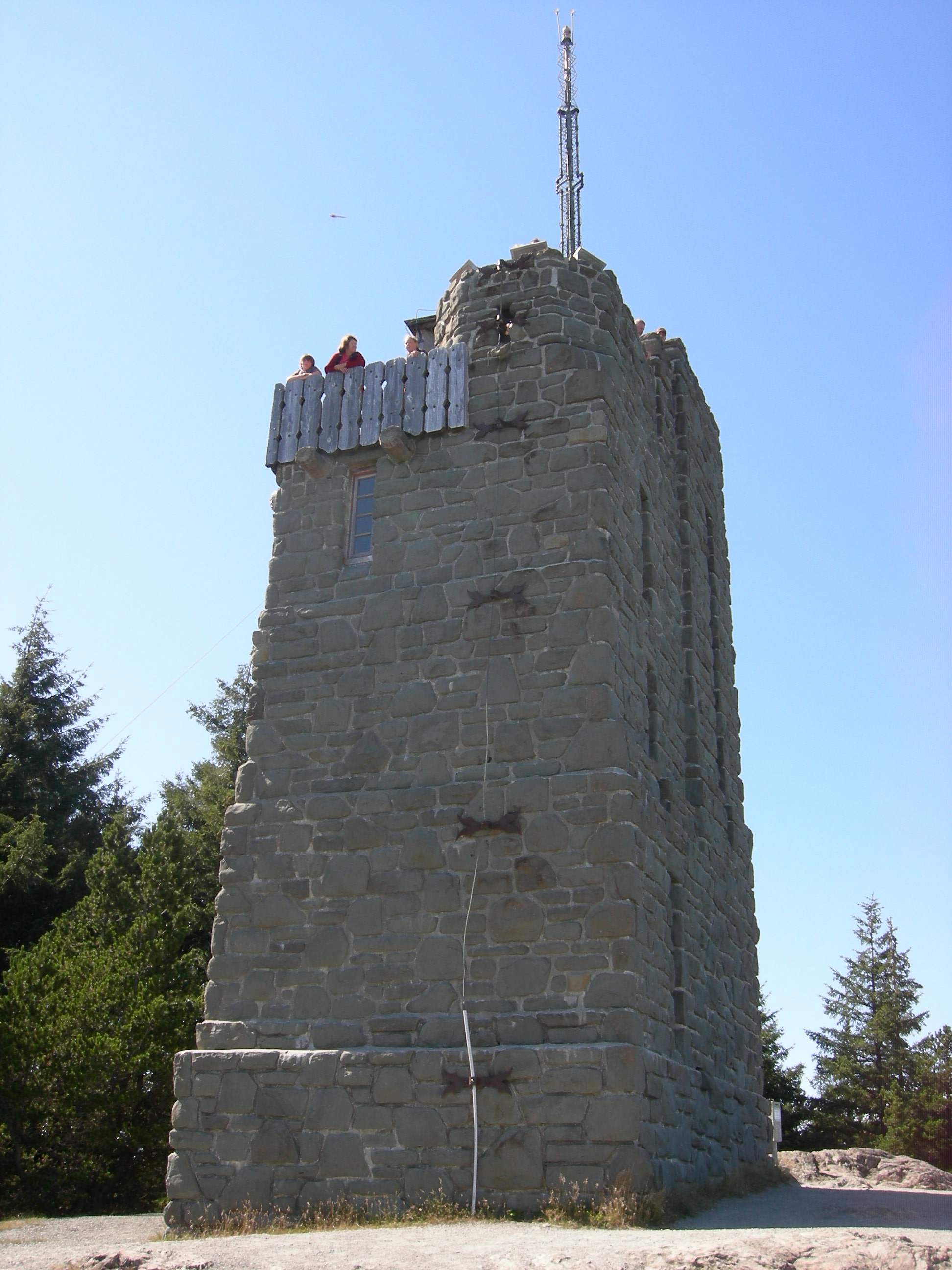
At the top of Mount Constitution sits a 53-foot sandstone tower, reinforced with 2 tons of steel, and measuring 18 x 28 feet at the base.

== Stone observation tower ==
A stone observation tower patterned after a medieval watch tower stands 52 feet (16 m) above the summit, which is 2,400 feet (730 m) above sea level.

=== Designer and builder ===
It was designed by architect Ellsworth Storey and built by the Civilian Conservation Corps in 1936.

=== Views ===
The tower offers panoramic views of the surrounding islands, the Cascade Mountains, the Olympic Mountains, and many Canadian and American cities. On a clear day, the view encompasses locations as diverse as Mount Baker, Mount Rainier, Saturna Island, and the cities of Vancouver, and Victoria, British Columbia.

== Location and naming ==
Mount Constitution lies within the 5,000-acre (20.2 km^{2}) Moran State Park.

The prominence was named by Charles Wilkes during the Wilkes Expedition of 1838-1842 for the USS Constitution.
