= Ellsworth Storey =

American architect

Ellsworth Prime Storey
- Born: November 16, 1879; Chicago, Illinois
- Died: May 28, 1960 (aged 80)
- Education: University of Illinois
- Occupation: Architect
- Buildings: Hoo Hoo House (Alaska–Yukon–Pacific Exposition), Beacon Hill First Baptist Church
- Projects: Ellsworth Storey Cottages, Mount Constitution Lookout Tower

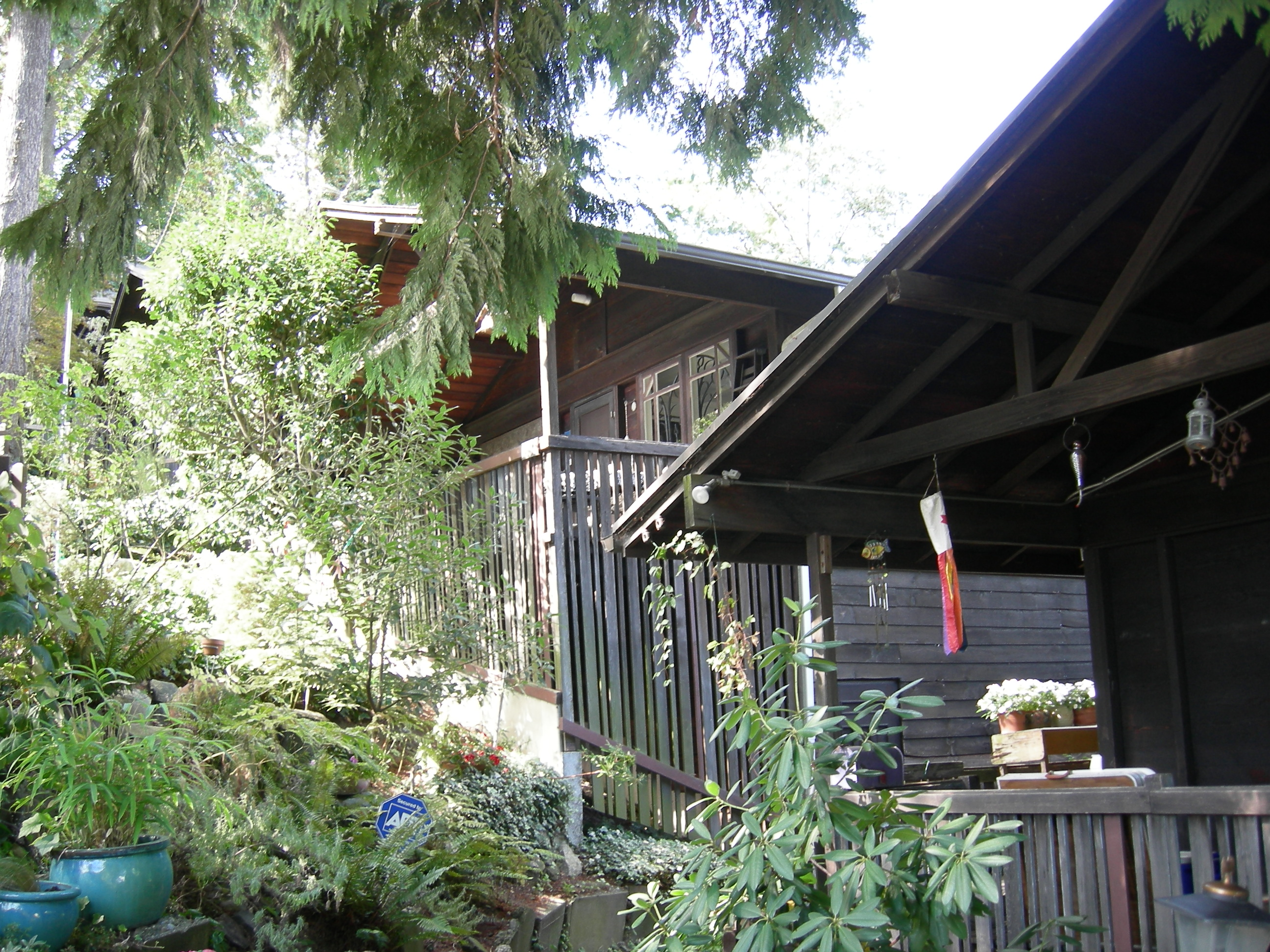
The Ellsworth Storey Cottages (1910-1915) near Colman Park in Seattle's Mount Baker neighborhood are listed on the National Register of Historic Places.

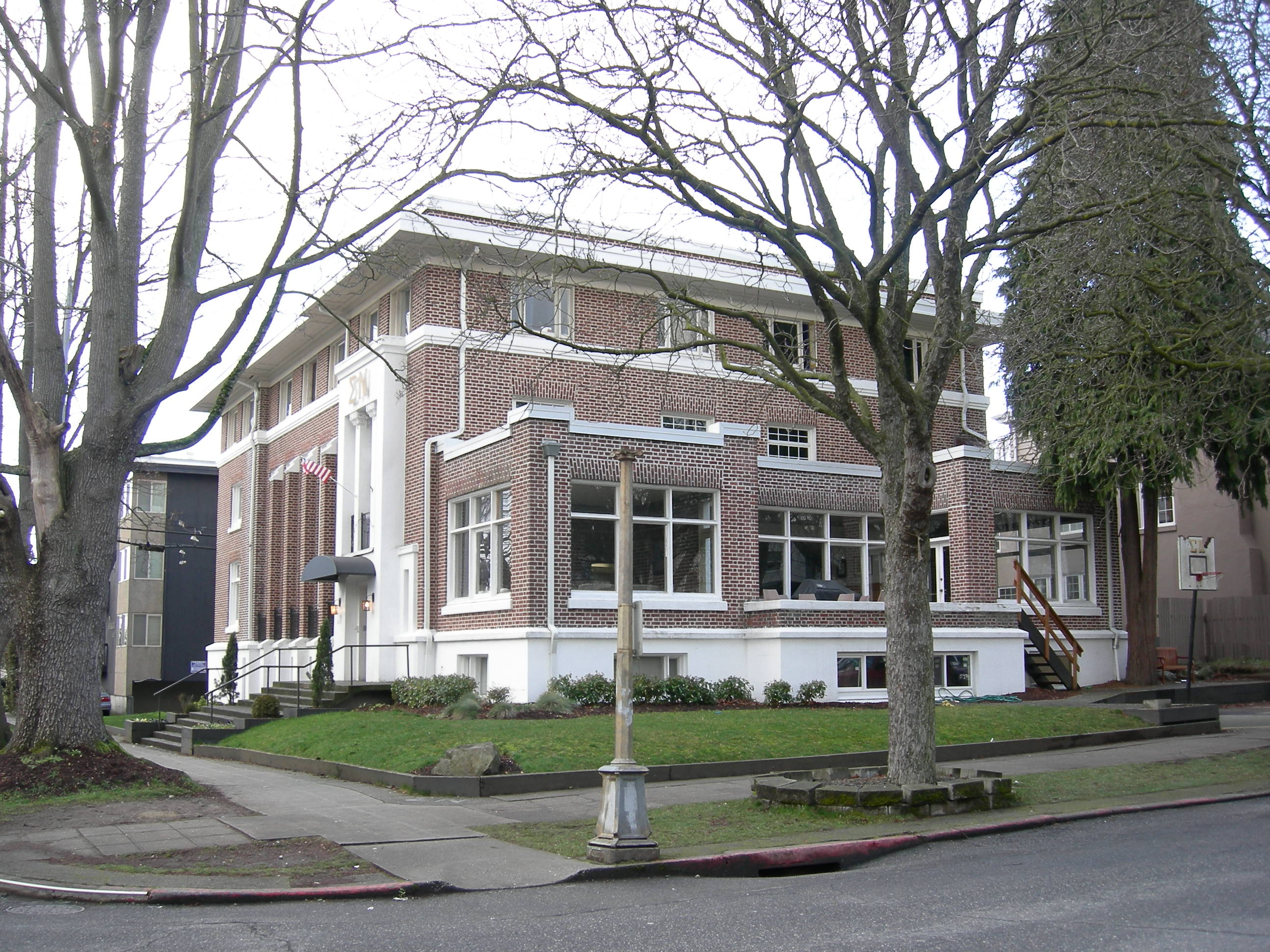
The heavy masonry pylons of Sigma Nu fraternity house, University of Washington, are similar to those found in Frank Lloyd Wright's Unity Temple and Larkin Building.

Ellsworth Storey (November 16, 1879 – May 28, 1960) was a Seattle architect. He is known for combining contemporary and historical architectural styles with local materials to create a regional architectural style that reflected the natural environment of the Pacific Northwest.

Storey was inspired to become an architect after visiting the World's Columbian Exposition as a child. He attended architecture school at the University of Illinois at the same time as Walter Burley Griffin, where he was influenced by the new Prairie School of architecture and its main proponent, Frank Lloyd Wright.

He moved to Seattle in 1903 to begin his career. His early projects, including the Hoo Hoo house, designed for the Alaska–Yukon–Pacific Exposition, were designed in a mix of Arts and Crafts and Tudor Revival styles, but also incorporated elements of pioneer architecture. Many of Storey's early residences, including the Henry C. Storey and Ellsworth Storey houses, which he built for himself and his parents, reflect his fondness for Swiss chalets.

Storey's residential and commercial projects included private houses, the Sigma Nu fraternity house of the University of Washington, and several churches. His designs blended the Prairie Style with a wide variety of historical American and European architectural styles such as Georgian and Elizabethan revival, English gothic, Mission style, and California bungalow.

Between 1912 and 1915, Storey built a set of 12 rental cottages adjacent to Colman Park on Lake Washington Boulevard. The Ellsworth Storey Cottages, as they came to be known, were constructed with exposed frames, shingled roofs, and interior detailing made from local woods. The cottages also featured generous front porches that encouraged neighborly interactions, and modular designs that made the most of their modest size. The fresh, non-derivative forms of these cottages, and their imaginative use of local materials, influenced the Northwest Regional style developed by mid-century modernist architects such as John Yeon and Pietro Belluschi.

In 1934, Storey began work on facilities for Moran State Park. His buildings incorporated Arts and Crafts motifs into the prevalent rustic style of the National Park Service. The project culminated in the construction of eight buildings, including a 12-story fire lookout tower on Mount Constitution.

Storey continued to work with government agencies into the 1950s, including projects for the Federal Housing Authority and United States Navy's Sand Point Naval Air Station. He retired completely from architecture in 1955. He died in 1960, in Ithaca, New York, and requested that his ashes be scattered over Puget Sound.
