= Islandale, Washington =

Unincorporated community in San Juan County, Washington

- Unincorporated community
- Location within Washington (state) Location within the United States
- Coordinates: 48°26′46″N 122°51′28″W
- Country: United States
- State: Washington
- County: San Juan
- Established: 1910
- Elevation: 98 ft (30 m)
- Time zone: UTC-8 (Pacific (PST))
  - Summer (DST): UTC-7 (PDT)
- GNIS feature ID: 1514691

Islandale is an unincorporated community in San Juan County, in the U.S. state of Washington.

== History ==
A post office called Islandale was established in 1910, and remained in operation until 1917. The community was named for its location on Lopez Island.
