= Port Stanley School =

Historic school

- Schoolhouse in 2021
- Interactive map of the Port Stanley School area

General information
- Type: Wood
- Location: 144 Grayling Ln, Lopez Island, WA, USA
- Coordinates: 48.525°N 122.877°W
- Port Stanley School
- U.S. National Register of Historic Places
- Nearest city: Lopez Island, Washington
- Area: 1 acre
- Built: 1876; 1888; 1917 (current building)
- NRHP reference No.: 94001437
- Added to NRHP: December 9, 1994

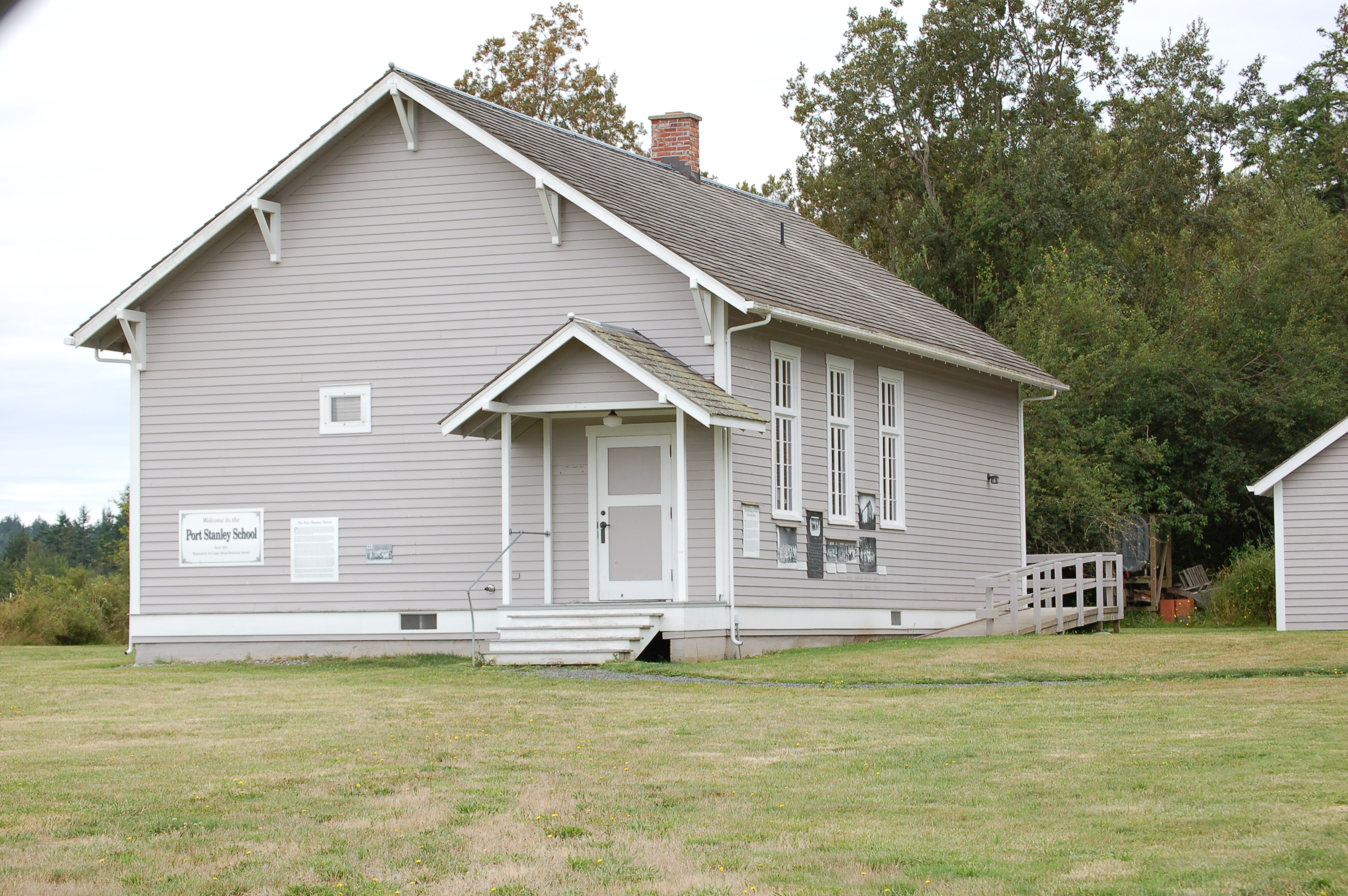
Schoolhouse in 2007

The Port Stanley School is located on Lopez Island, in the San Juan Islands (San Juan County), Washington, in the United States. It was listed on the U.S. National Register of Historic Places in 1994. The building was restored in 2003 and currently serves as an exhibit of the Lopez Island Historical Society and community space.

== History ==
The Port Stanley School was first constructed in 1876 in the style of a rough log cabin, however no photos of this building are currently known to exist. In 1888, a lumber-framed second version of the school had been built to replace the previous building. When constructed, it was a single room school house accommodating a class of 25 children. In 1917, Lee Norderer (a then recent graduate of Seattle's Lincoln High School) designed and had constructed the craftsman-styled third version of the Port Stanley School. This version of the school was in use until the Lopez Island School districts consolidated in 1941. The building was left vacant and mostly unused until it was donated to the Lopez Island Historical Society by Christopher and Helena Jones's family in December 1994. In 1996 restoration work began and continued until 2005.

It is a one-story school building which had a cloakroom, a single classroom, and, per its National Register nomination, a room at the rear for a teacher's office and library. Per a plan of the school available at the Lopez Island Historical Society and Museum website, the rear room was a second classroom.
