= Emmanuel Episcopal Church (Eastsound, Washington) =

Historic church in Washington, United States

Coordinates: 48.6943°N 122.9075°W

- U.S. National Register of Historic Places
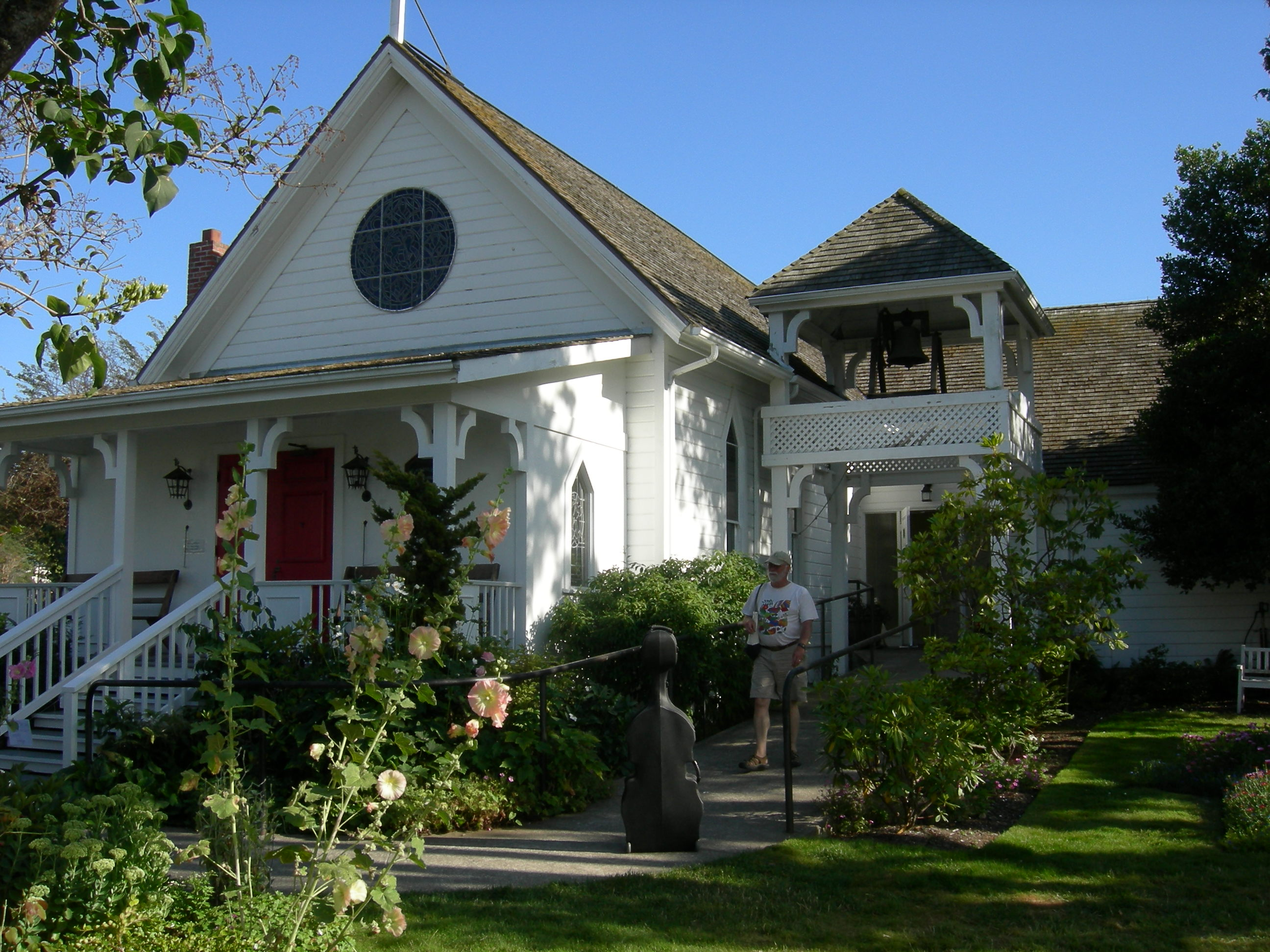
- Emmanuel Episcopal Church, Orcas Island, Washington
- Location: 242 Main Street Orcas Island Eastsound, Washington
- Built: 1885
- NRHP reference No.: 94001431
- Added to NRHP: December 12, 1994

Emmanuel Episcopal Church is a historic Carpenter Gothic church located on Main Street in Eastsound on Orcas Island, Washington. On December 12, 1994, it was added to the National Register of Historic Places.

== National Register listing ==
- Emmanuel Episcopal Church (added 1994 - Building - #94001431)
- Main St., Eastsound
- Historic Significance: Event
- Area of Significance: Exploration/Settlement
- Period of Significance: 1875–1899, 1900–1924
- Owner: Private
- Historic Function: Religion
- Historic Sub-function: Religious Structure
- Current Function: Religion
- Current Sub-function: Religious Structure

== Current use ==
The church is still functioning.

== See also ==
List of Registered Historic Places in Washington
