= Deer Harbor, Washington =

Unincorporated community in San Juan County, Washington

Deer Harbor
- Unincorporated community
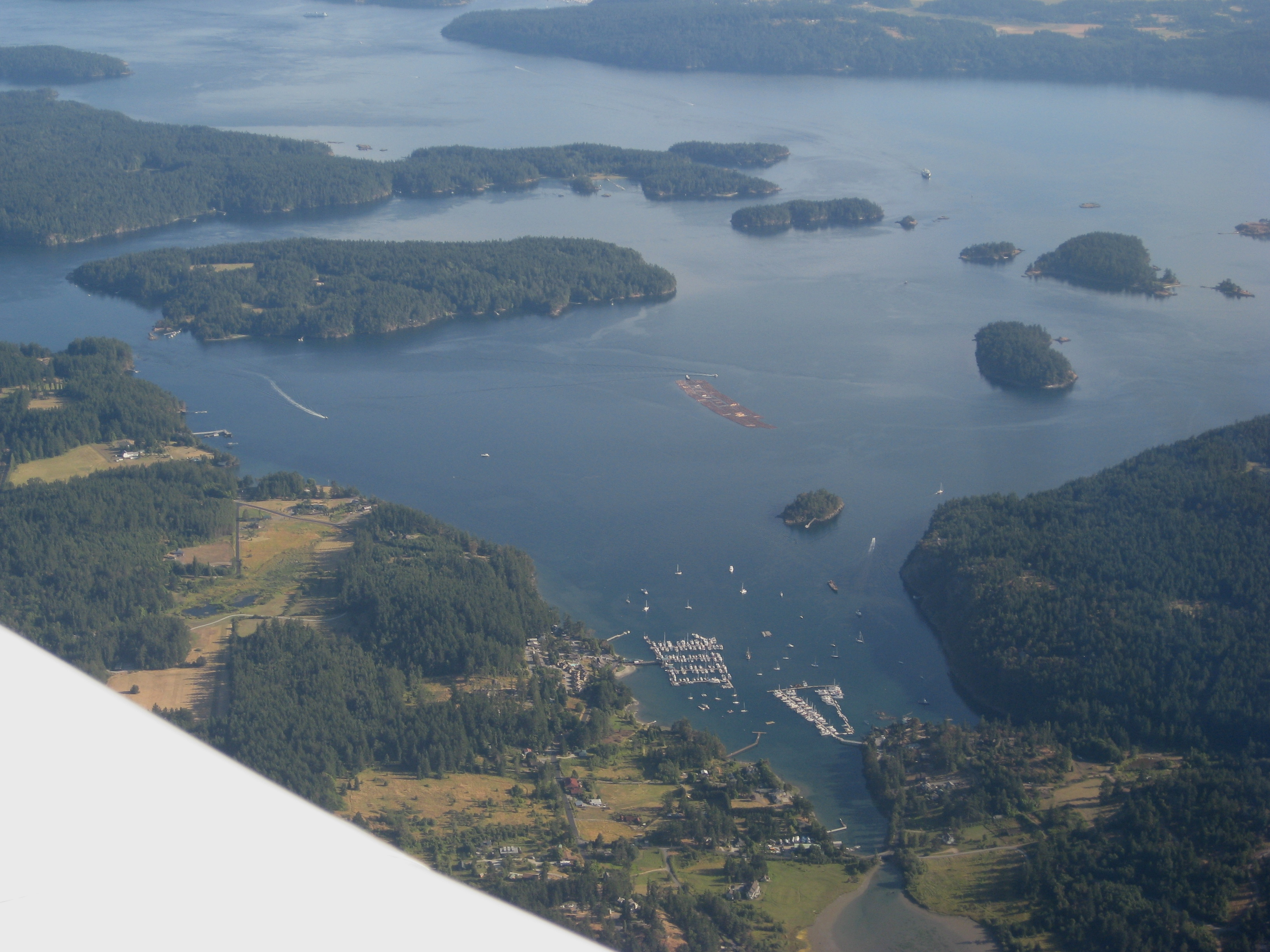
- Deer Harbor, Washington

- Location within the state of Washington
- Coordinates: 48°37′24″N 123°00′30″W
- Country: United States
- State: Washington
- County: San Juan
- First settled: 1852

Population (2023)
  - Total: 340
- Time zone: UTC-8 (Pacific (PST))
  - Summer (DST): UTC-7 (PDT)
- ZIP codes: 98243
- GNIS feature ID: 1504414
- Website: Deer Harbor Marina

Deer Harbor is an unincorporated community on Orcas Island in San Juan County, Washington, United States.

The population of the community was 340, according to a census that took place in 2023.

== History ==
The very first expeditions of the San Juan Islands took place in 1792, directed by the Spanish Empire, during one of the Spanish expeditions to the Pacific Northwest. When the first Europeans arrived on Orcas Island, in Deer Harbor they found a peaceful Lummi people encampment. It would take another 50 years before in the 1840s both the United States and the British Empire explored the area.

The very first permanent European settlers would however only arrive in the current spot of Deer Harbor in 1852. One year later, the very first post office was established on January 14. In 1858 the name Deer Harbor first officially appeared on British Admiralty charts of the San Juan Islands, signaling an official recognition by the British authorities of the settlements in the area.

In 1905, the town built a two-room schoolhouse, and in 1907, the city's dance hall was created. A bridge connecting the two sided of the slough upon which the city was built was created in 1910.

A coastal defense observation post was built behind a local Inn in 1941 in order to help with the war effort during the Second World War.

== Culture ==
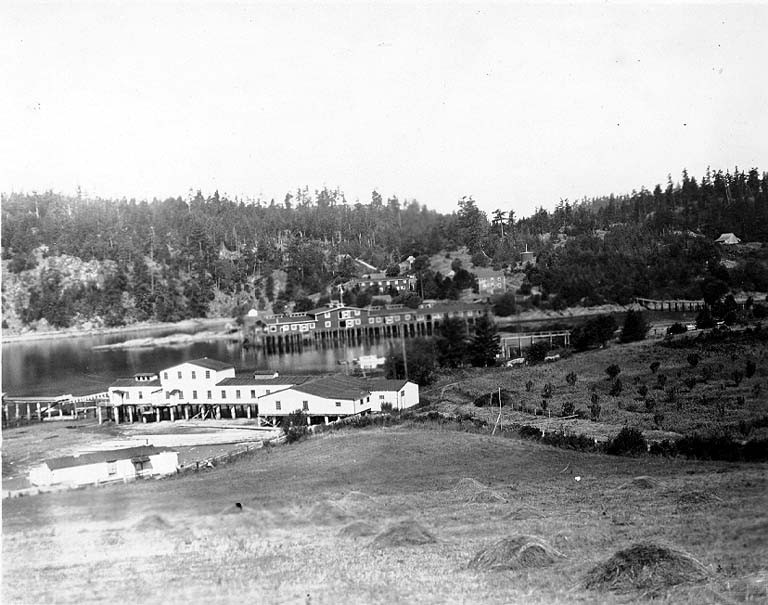
George W. Hume Co. and Deer Harbor Fisheries Co. salmon canneries at Deer Harbor, 1919

As with most San Juan Islands communities, Deer Harbor is known for its recreation and tourism, including kayaking, whale watching, and fishing. Many people fish for Dungeness crab, rock crab, and shrimp there.

Doe Bay is a community on the opposite side of the island from Deer Harbor. Deer Harbor is assigned the ZIP code 98243.
