= Mitchell Bay Band of the San Juan Islands =

Coast Salish community in San Juan Islands, Washington

The Mitchell Bay Band of the San Juan Islands is an Indigenous Coast Salish community based in the San Juan Islands of Washington, United States. The community was first referred to as the Mitchell Bay Tribe by Office of Indian Affairs agent Charles Roblin in his 1919 Census of Unenrolled Indians, in reference to one of several bays with historically significant indigenous populations.

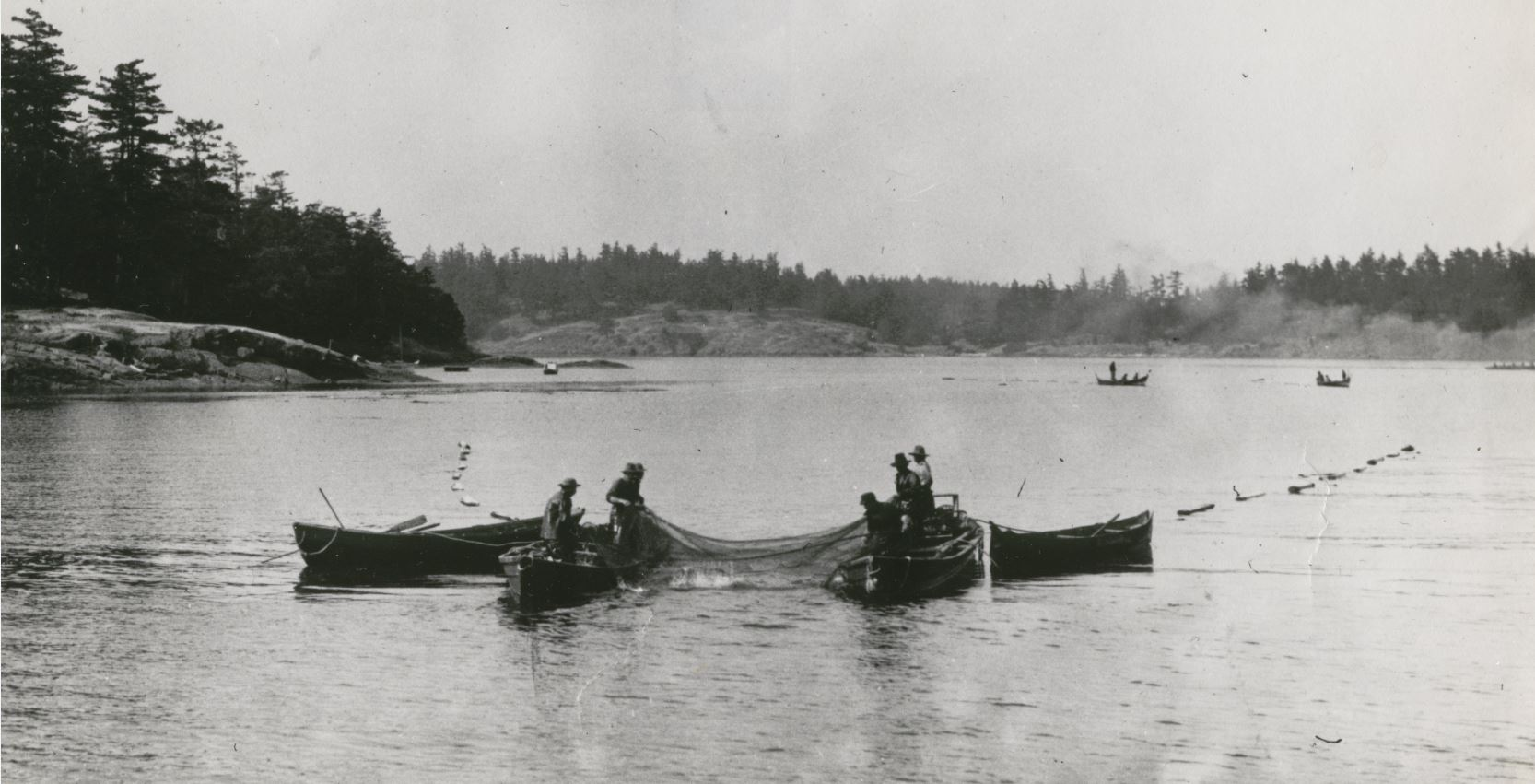
Reef netting, an efficient form of fishing that the Coast Salish peoples say was a gift from the Creator, is still conducted by Coast Salish peoples, including members of the Mitchell Bay Band

Mitchell Bay Band ancestors were related to other peoples — among them the Lummi, Saanich and Samish — with whom they share an origin story and language. Great Britain and the United States claimed and jointly occupied San Juan Island from 1859 to 1872. After the dispute was settled in favor of the U.S., many Indigenous people moved to reservations at Lummi or Swinomish; many others, however, chose to remain on the island. These individuals were grouped in Roblin's census as the Mitchell Bay Tribe or the San Juan Tribe.

Members of the Mitchell Bay Band met on June 5, 1976, to adopt a constitution and bylaws and elect a government in an effort to become a party to U.S. v. Washington. Efforts to establish federal recognition — and a government-to-government relationship with the U.S. government — have to date been unsuccessful.

== History ==
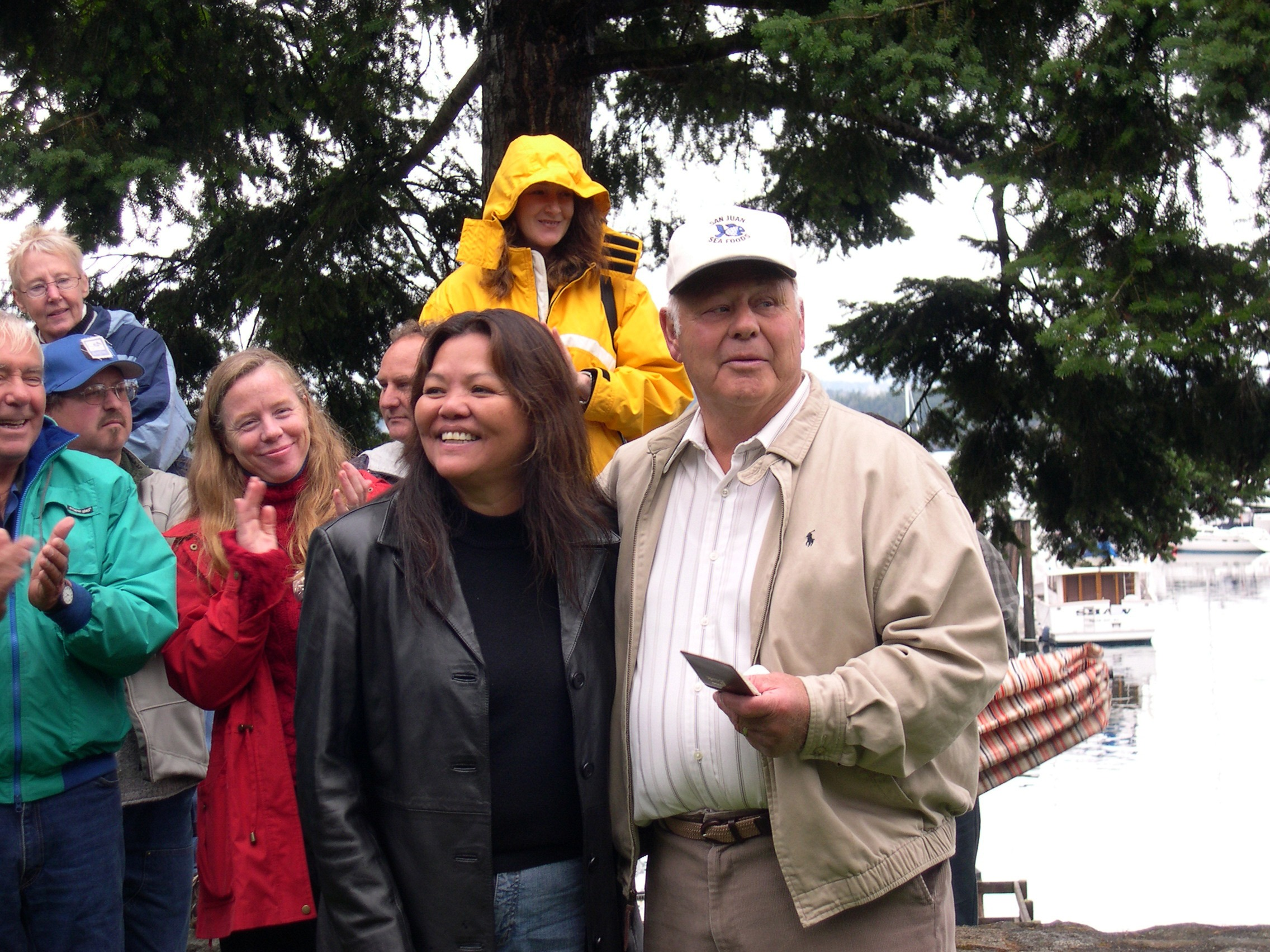
E.W. Chevalier, elder of the Mitchell Bay Band, pictured in May 2004

- Pre-contact: The ancestors of today's Northern Straits Coast Salish, including those of the Mitchell Bay Band, begin to appear in the wake of the continental ice sheet that resided 11,000 years ago. Their creation story traces their origin to a common ancestor, sweh-tuhn, who first appeared at Open Bay on Henry Island. The Indigenous people of the San Juan islands and surrounding areas are primarily members of six Coast Salish groups who speak the Northern Straits language: Sooke, Saanich, Songhees, Lummi, Samish and Semiahmoo. In addition to sharing language, these groups share a culture that encompasses a wide variety of marine and upland resources. They follow patterns of seasonal movement between islands and the mainland from large winter villages to smaller resource collection camps in the other seasons.
- 1855: Leaders of 23 Indigenous Nations sign the Treaty of Point Elliott, which makes a large swath of Western Washington available for non-Native settlement. To ensure all aboriginal land claims are extinguished, several leaders are appointed to sign on behalf of non-named or non-represented groups. Chow-its-hoot, a leader of the Lummi people, signs as “chief of the Lummi and other allied tribes,” including those living in the San Juan Islands. The U.S. Court of Claims later rules in a land claims case (1927) that the island's Indigenous peoples are "a subordinate band of the Lummi and Samish Indian tribes, and as such bound by the treaty of Point Elliott to which the Lummi Tribe agreed.”
- 1884: She-Kla-Malt (1825–1900) obtains title to a Lhaq'temish (Lummi) village site, part of the larger community of whelaalk (near present-day Roche Harbor), through the Indian Trust Homestead Act. This site remains in Indigenous ownership – and a gathering place for the Indigenous community – until 1983, when She-Kla-Malt's granddaughter Pearl Little died without direct heirs.
- 1900: Indigenous leaders on the island, identified in depositions in 1927 before the U.S. Court of Claims in Duwamish et al v. United States, include Captain George (southeast San Juan Island, at present-day Cape San Juan), and Chief Seattlak (Bald Hill, on Griffin Bay).
- 1919: Charles Roblin, an agent for the U.S. Office of Indian Affairs, identifies 180 people as being of the Mitchell Bay or San Juan Tribe.
- 1926: The “San Juan Islands Tribes of Indians” are listed as a plaintiff in the case of Duwamish et al v United States, which seeks just compensation for lands ceded in the Treaty of Point Elliott.
- 1927: Among those testifying in Duwamish et al v United States is Catherine Mason, secretary of the San Juan Tribe of Indians. She testifies that 318 people are enrolled with the Tribe.
- 1957: The San Juan Tribe of Indians file a land compensation claim with the Indian Claims Commission. The claim is denied. The commission rules: “It appears from the evidence that the San Juan Tribe of Indians are composed, at least in part, of descendants and successors in interest of the Lummi and Samish Indians, both of whom have filed claims before the Commission.”
- 1971: The Mitchell Bay Indian Tribe is included in a report of the Washington state Indian Affairs Task Force, “Are You Listening, Neighbor?”
- 1976: The people of the Mitchell Bay Indian Tribe adopt a constitution and bylaws and elect a seven-member council. William P. Chevalier is elected chairman.

== Present day ==
- Mitchell Bay Band members and descendants continue to be involved in cultural preservation, habitat and resource protection, Indian law, and traditional fisheries.
- The National Park Service commissions a report, "Historical Study of the Mitchell Bay Band and San Juan Tribe."
