= Eastsound, Washington =

Unincorporated community in San Juan County, Washington

Eastsound
- Unincorporated community
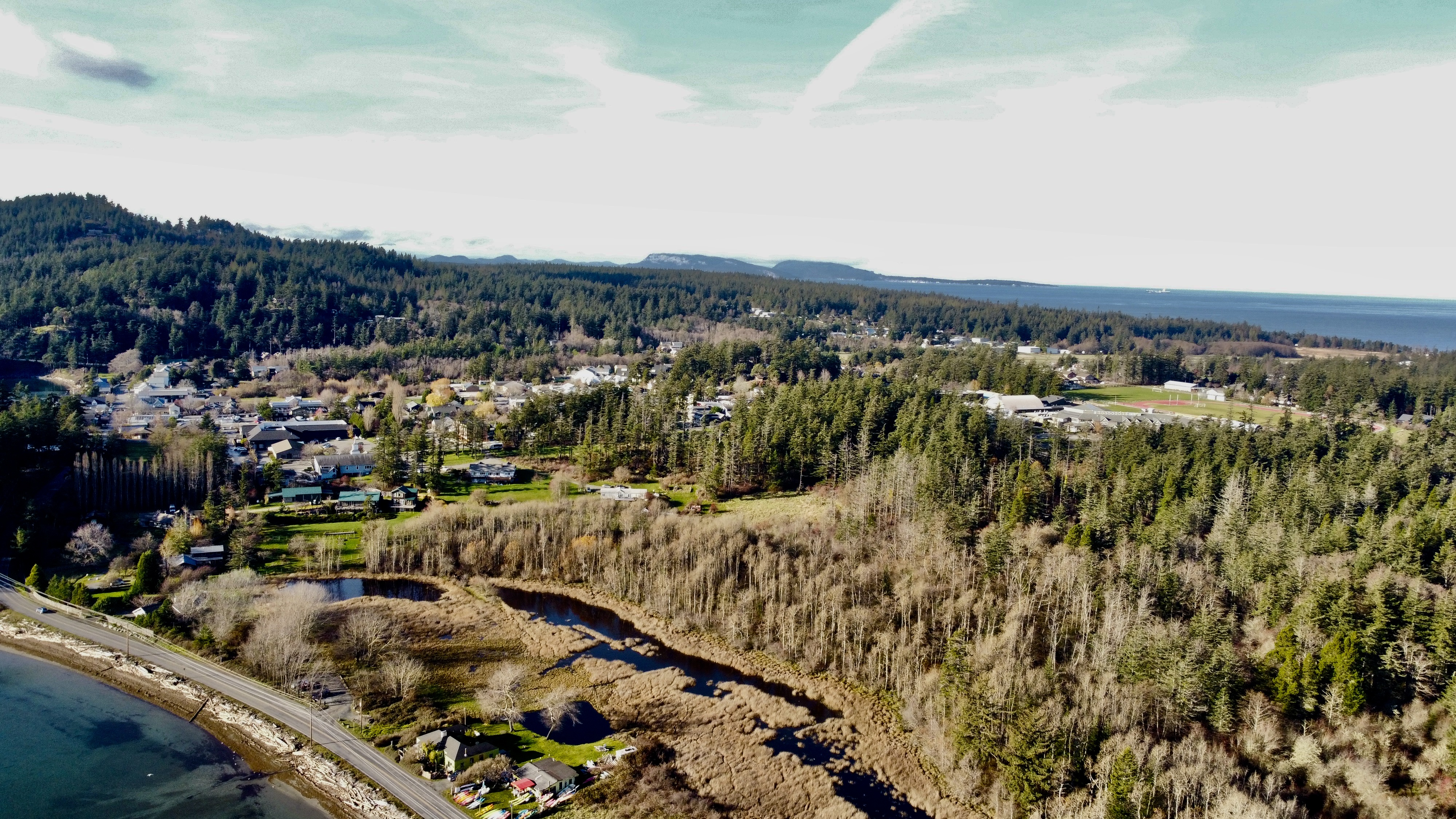
- Eastsound, Washington

- Location in the state of Washington
- Coordinates: 48°41′48″N 122°54′20″W
- Country: United States
- State: Washington
- County: San Juan
- Elevation: 49 ft (15 m)
- Time zone: UTC-8 (Pacific (PST))
  - Summer (DST): UTC-7 (PDT)
- ZIP code: 98245
- GNIS feature ID: 1513104

Eastsound (not to be confused with East Sound, which is the body of water adjoining Eastsound) is an unincorporated community on Orcas Island in San Juan County, Washington, United States. Eastsound is the largest population center on Orcas Island, the second-most populated (after San Juan Island) and physically largest of the San Juan Islands.

== History ==
The first inhabitants of Eastsound were the Lummi tribe, who were often raided by the warlike Haida, who traveled from Southeast Alaska in massive war canoes to attack the Lummis, for the purpose of slaving. The Haida had a distinct advantage, armed with flintlock rifles obtained from Russian traders. The first white people arrived in the 1850s, employees of the Hudson's Bay Company sent from the Fort Victoria post to hunt deer. These trappers brought smallpox, which, combined with the brutal Haida attacks, significantly reduced the native population.

One of the first European settlers of Eastsound was Charles Shattuck, who built a log cabin and operated a store in the late 1850s. Other early inhabitants of note included Michael Adams, a prospector and trapper from Pennsylvania and horticulturalist who planted the first apple orchard on Orcas. Belle Langell was the first white child born on Orcas, the daughter of Ephraim and Rosa Langell, who homesteaded near Michael Adams in present-day Eastsound. The Emmanuel Episcopal Church (Eastsound, Washington) was the first church on Orcas Island, was built in 1885, by the Reverend Sidney Robert Spencer Gray, on a plot of land deeded from Charles Shattuck.

Steamboats of the Puget Sound Mosquito Fleet used to dock at East Sound, one such vessel was the Sioux, a steel steamship built in 1910 and running out of Bellingham under the ownership of the Black Ball Line.

== Climate ==
Climate data for Eastsound, Washington
Month	Jan	Feb	Mar	Apr	May	Jun	Jul	Aug	Sep	Oct	Nov	Dec	Year
Record high °F (°C)	65 (18)	66 (19)	76 (24)	78 (26)	87 (31)	89 (32)	92 (33)	89 (32)	87 (31)	77 (25)	67 (19)	65 (18)	92 (33)
Mean daily maximum °F (°C)	47 (8)	49 (9)	53 (12)	58 (14)	63 (17)	67 (19)	71 (22)	71 (22)	67 (19)	59 (15)	50 (10)	46 (8)	58 (15)
Mean daily minimum °F (°C)	36 (2)	36 (2)	38 (3)	41 (5)	45 (7)	48 (9)	51 (11)	51 (11)	48 (9)	44 (7)	38 (3)	34 (1)	43 (6)
Record low °F (°C)	−8 (−22)	−4 (−20)	10 (−12)	28 (−2)	31 (−1)	37 (3)	40 (4)	38 (3)	32 (0)	26 (−3)	4 (−16)	2 (−17)	−8 (−22)
Average precipitation inches (mm)	3.92 (100)	2.49 (63)	2.33 (59)	1.89 (48)	1.80 (46)	1.29 (33)	0.80 (20)	1.06 (27)	1.33 (34)	2.97 (75)	4.82 (122)	3.54 (90)	28.24 (717)
Source: weather.com

== Culture ==
The town is known for its community events, frequent musical performances, recreation and tourism. Eastsound consists of a village green, a few hotels and several restaurants, numerous gift shops, large grocery store, food co-op, hardware store, pharmacy, brewery, various music venues, several churches, post office, school, small airport, and public dock. Eastsound's scenic location, thriving music and arts community, and quaint village aesthetic makes it a popular tourist destination.

== Parks and recreation ==
There is a public village green with extensive lawn, picnic tables, shade trees, and outdoor stage that hosts music performances, community events, and the weekly farmers' market. Indian Island is just offshore Eastsound's public beach. Moran State Park is located near the community.

== Infrastructure ==
Half a mile north of Eastsound is Orcas Island Airport, with scheduled service to Seattle, Bellingham, Anacortes, Friday Harbor and Lopez Island and unscheduled service to many other locations. Washington State Ferry service to other islands and the mainland is located 8.4 miles south at Orcas Landing.

== Media ==
The Islands' Sounder, a weekly publication founded as the Orcas Sounder in 1964, is based in Eastsound.

== Notable residents ==
- William Anders, astronaut
- Gary Larson, cartoonist
