= Rosario (estate) =

Historic house in Washington, United States

- U.S. National Register of Historic Places
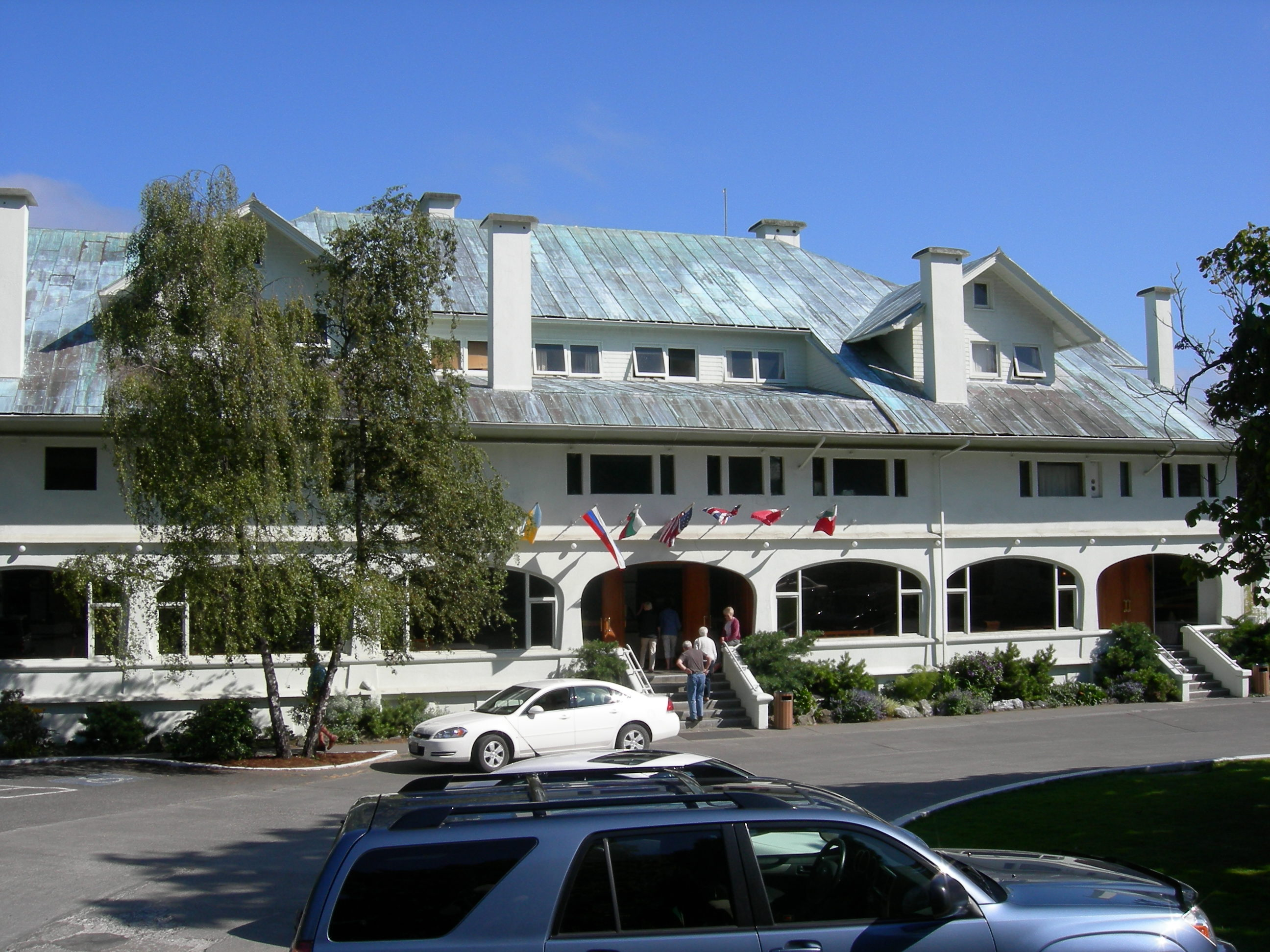

- Location within Washington (state)
- Location: South of East Sound on Orcas Island, Washington
- Coordinates: 48°38′43″N 122°52′20″W
- Area: 84 acres (34 ha)
- Built: 1906-1909
- Architect: Moran, Robert
- Architectural style: Arts and Craft, Nautical
- NRHP reference No.: 78002772
- Added to NRHP: November 2, 1978

Rosario is the former estate of Seattle mayor and shipbuilder Robert Moran and is located on Orcas Island, Washington in the San Juan archipelago. Portions of the estate became part of Moran State Park in the early 1920s and the site has been of use as the Rosario Resort and Spa since 1960. The estate was listed on the National Register of Historic Places in 1978.

== History ==
Due to poor health, Robert Moran, a former Seattle Mayor and shipbuilder, moved to Orcas Island and between 1906 and 1909 built his estate. Wood and stone material found on the island were used to construct the estate's houses and buildings. In 1921, Moran gave a large portion of his property to the state of Washington for the creation of Moran State Park. Moran sold the resort in 1938 and the mansion and its grounds have been sold several times since, but remained in private hands. It began operating as the Rosario Resort and Spa in 1960.

The Rosario Resort was listed for sale in 2023 and by February 2024, the resort was temporarily closed after the sale was completed. The new owners planned to renovate the building with particular attention to the Moran Mansion. During the closure, the marina and grounds remained open for use. The resort, excepting the mansion, was partially reopened two months later. The final sale cost was listed as more than $20 million.

Rosario was listed on the National Register of Historic Places in 1978.

== Architecture and design ==
Constructed in an Arts & Crafts style, the 5-story resort was named after the Rosario Strait and contains a music room that features a 1913 two-story 34-rank German-style Aeolian organ consisting of over 1,900 pipes and a 1900 Steinway grand piano. The hotel was also designed in a nautical style, containing stained glass windows, a Tiffany chandelier, and two libraries. The 84-acre (34 ha) grounds (Note: Acreage of the grounds at Rosario has fluctuated mildly in reporting during and immediately after the 2024 estate sale, usually mentioning a measurement above 80 acres.) were designed with paths and water features. The Rosario mansion features a museum honoring Robert Moran, complete with original furnishings.
