= West Sound, Washington =

Unincorporated community in San Juan County, Washington

West Sound
- Unincorporated community
- Interactive map of West Sound
- Coordinates: 48°37′52.37″N 122°57′22.66″W
- Country: United States
- State: Washington
- County: San Juan
- Elevation: 36 ft (11 m)
- Time zone: UTC-8 (Pacific (PST))
  - Summer (DST): UTC-7 (PDT)
- ZIP codes: 98245
- GNIS feature ID: 1512796

West Sound (or Westsound) is an unincorporated community on Orcas Island in San Juan County, Washington, United States.

== Transportation ==
The locality is served by the Westsound Seaplane Base (IATA: WSX, FAA LID: WA83).
