= Orcas Village, Washington =

Unincorporated community in San Juan County, Washington

Orcas Village
- Unincorporated community
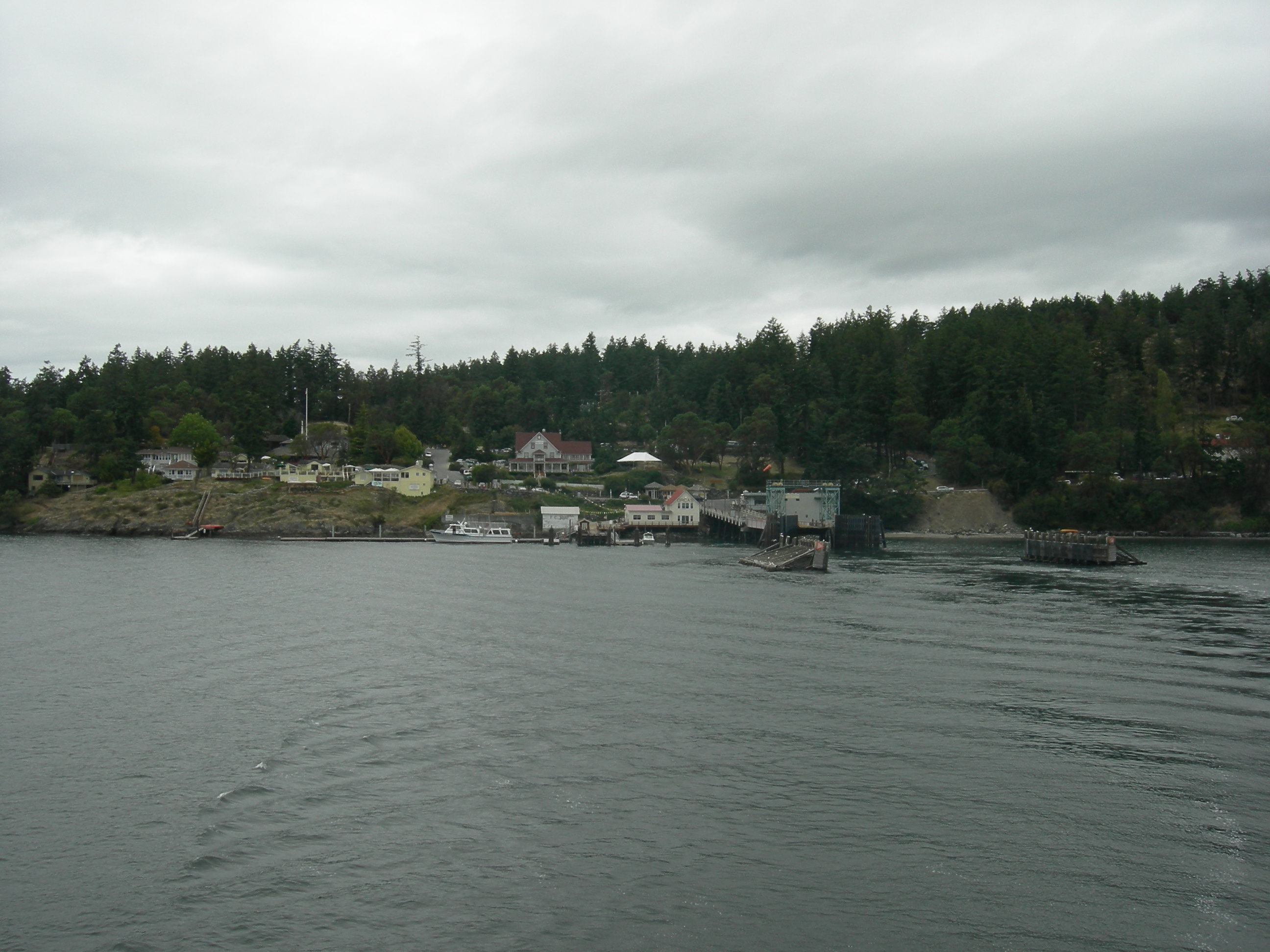
- Orcas Village, seen from the water (August 2007)

- Location within the state of Washington
- Coordinates: 48°35′52″N 122°56′41″W
- Country: United States
- State: Washington
- County: San Juan
- Elevation: 39 ft (12 m)
- Time zone: UTC-8 (Pacific (PST))
  - Summer (DST): UTC-7 (PDT)
- ZIP codes: 98280
- GNIS feature ID: 1512531

Orcas Village (also known as Orcas or Orcas Landing) is an unincorporated community at the southeastern corner of the West Sound watershed on Orcas Island in San Juan County, Washington, United States.

The only Washington State Ferry dock on the island is at Orcas Village and consequently handles all vehicular traffic to and from the island. While the island can also be accessed by Orcas Island Airport or by private boats, the ferry connection means that most people enter and leave the island through this small village, which consequently has restaurants, small grocery, and gift shops.

Orcas Village is home to the Orcas Hotel which was built 1904 and listed on the National Register of Historic Places since 1982. The town also has a small public dock, a private marina, and parking for islanders who commute off-island by ferry. It is designated as an activity center under San Juan County's comprehensive plan.
