= Moran State Park =

State park in Washington (state), US

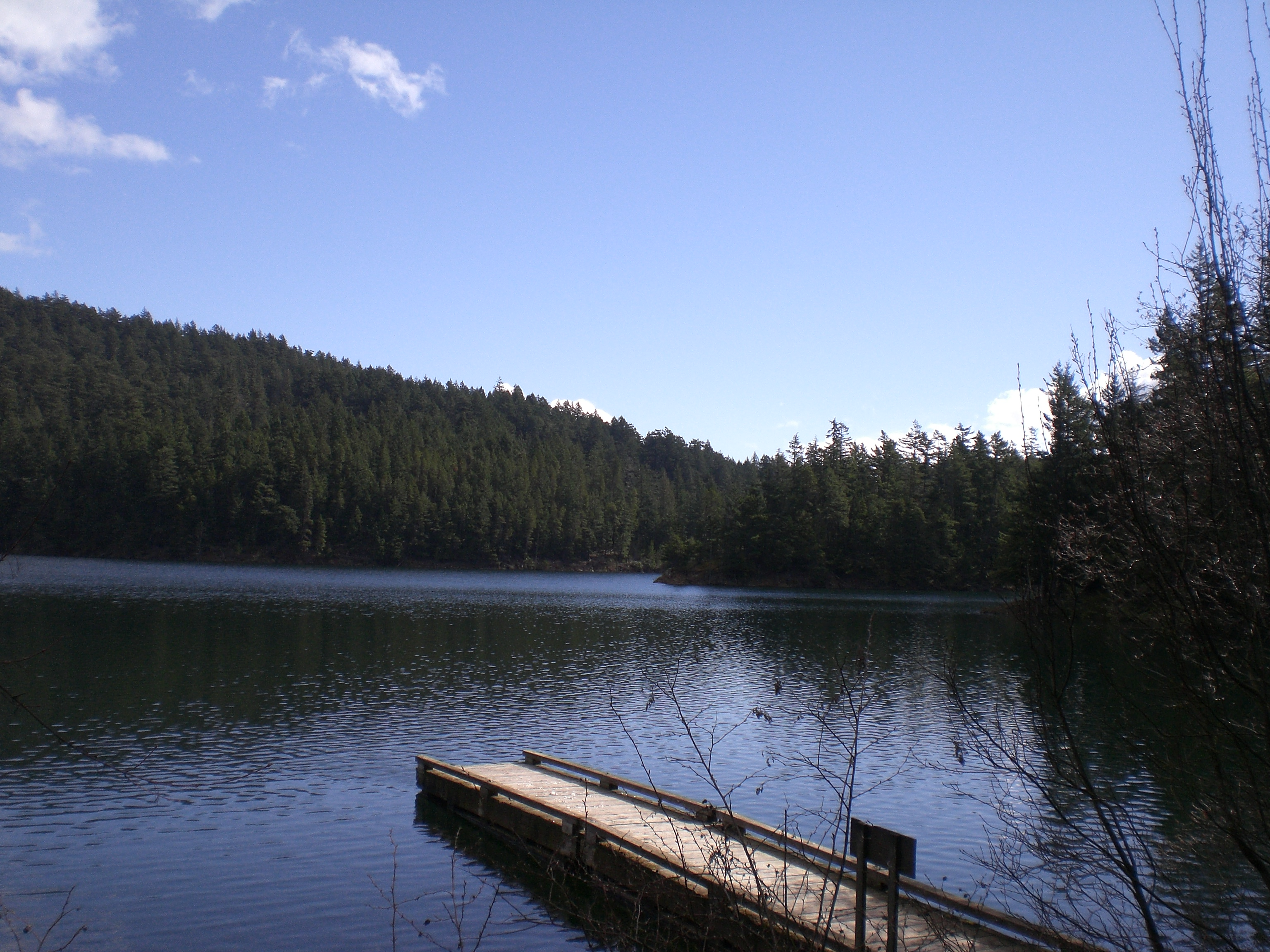
- Mountain Lake in Moran State Park

- Location within Washington (state) Location within the United States
- Location: San Juan County, Washington, United States
- Coordinates: 48°40′39″N 122°49′53″W
- Area: 5,424 acres (2,195 ha)
- Elevation: 2,402 ft (732 m)
- Established: 1921
- Administrator: Washington State Parks and Recreation Commission
- Visitors: 922,937 (in 2024)
- Website: Official website
- Moran State Park
- U.S. National Register of Historic Places
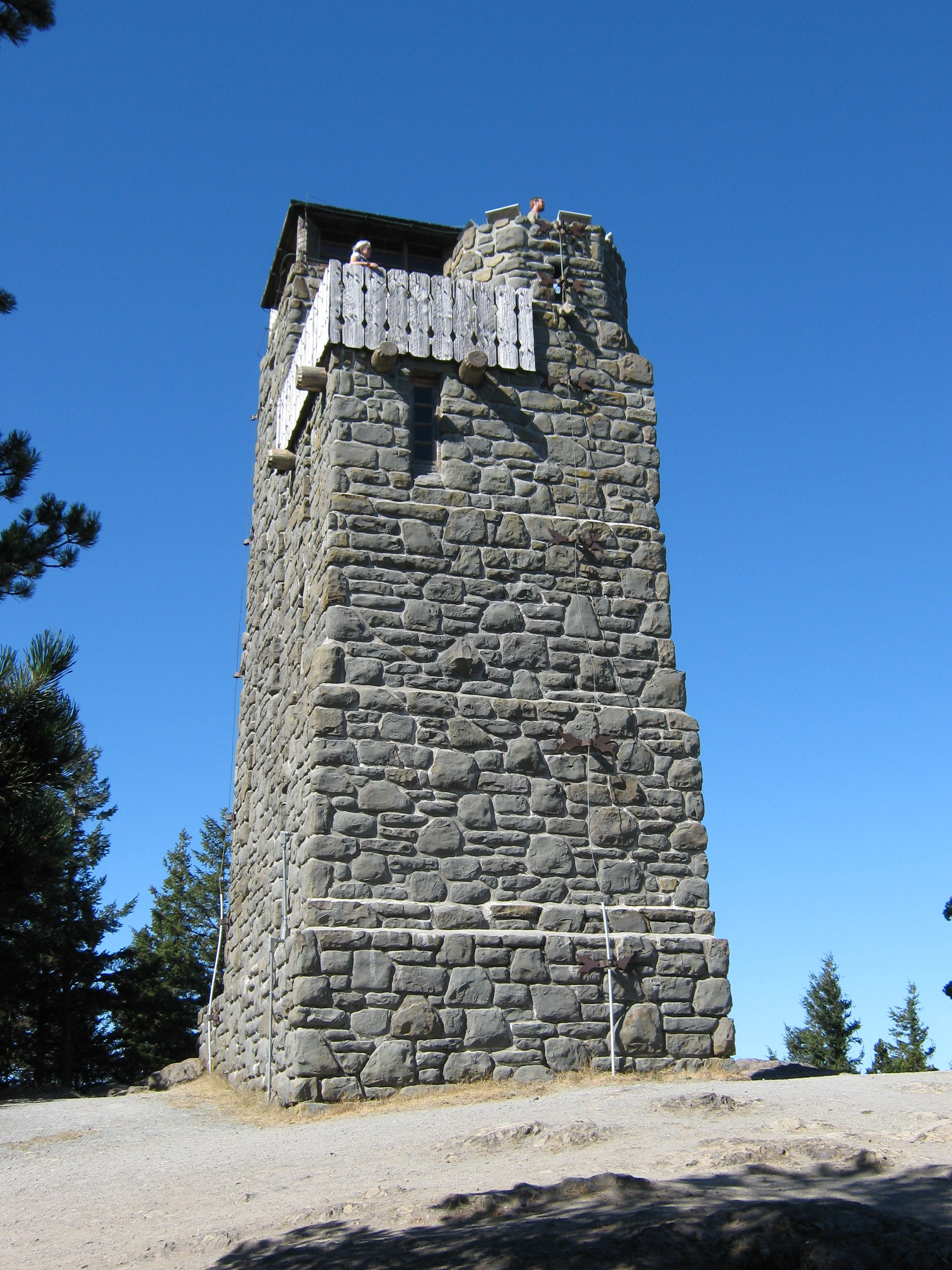
- Mt. Constitution observation tower
- Location: 3572 Olga Road, Olga, San Juan County; Orcas Island, Washington
- Built by: Civilian Conservation Corps
- Architect: Civilian Conservation Corps; Storey, Ellsworth; Paterson, Jack
- NRHP reference No.: 12001140
- Added to NRHP: January 2, 2013

Moran State Park is a public recreation area on Orcas Island in Puget Sound's San Juan Islands in the state of Washington, United States. The state park encompasses over 5,000 acres of various terrain including forests, wetlands, bogs, hills, and lakes. It is the largest public recreation area in the San Juan Islands and the fourth largest state park in the state. A park focal point is the observation tower atop Mount Constitution, the highest point in San Juan County at 2,407 feet.

== History ==
The park was originally the estate of Seattle mayor and shipbuilder Robert Moran. Due to poor health, Moran moved to Orcas Island and between 1906 and 1909 built his estate, which included a large mansion named Rosario. Wood and stone material found on the island were used to construct the estate's houses and buildings. In 1921, Moran gave a large portion of his property to the state of Washington for the creation of Moran State Park. The mansion and its grounds remain in private hands, operated as Rosario Resort and Spa.

In August 1935, 28 men from the 4768th Company of the Civilian Conservation Corps (CCC) began constructing a stone observation tower atop 2,407-foot (734 m) Mount Constitution. Designed by noted Seattle architect Ellsworth Storey, the tower became the literal and figurative high point of eight years of work by crews from the CCC's Camp Moran. The state park was added to the National Register of Historic Places in 2013.

== Activities and amenities ==
The park has more than 30 miles (48 km) of trails for hiking, biking and horseback riding, non-motorized boating from two boat ramps, and year-round camping in five camping areas. The Mount Constitution observation tower commands sweeping marine views from the highest point in the San Juan Islands.

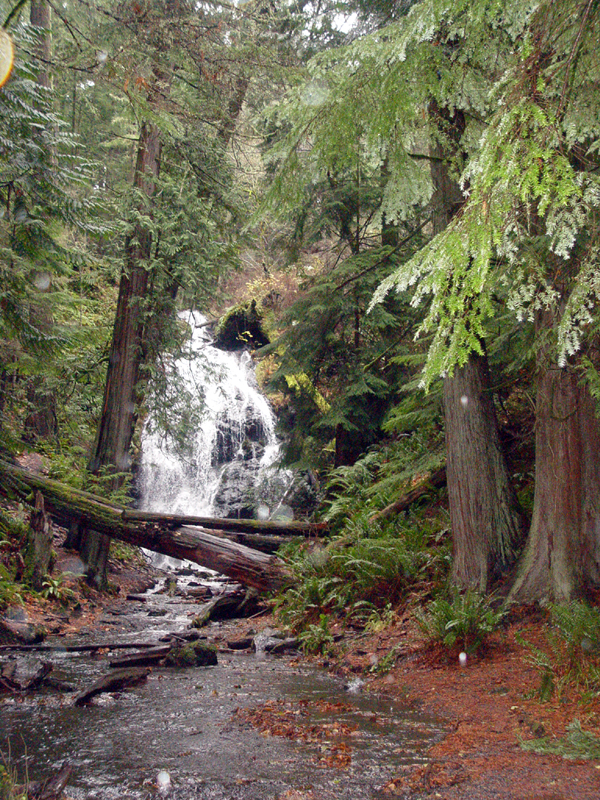
Cascade Falls

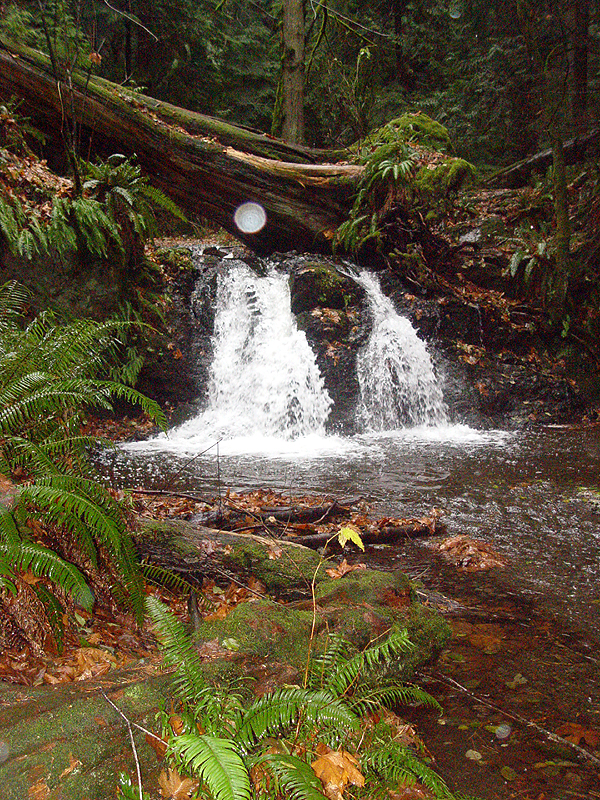
Rustic Falls on Cascade Creek

Friends of Moran raise money for park needs through fundraising and by operating a small gift shop at the top of the mountain. The volunteer group organizes park cleanups and improvement events.
