= Olga, Washington =

Unincorporated community in San Juan County, Washington

Olga
- Unincorporated community
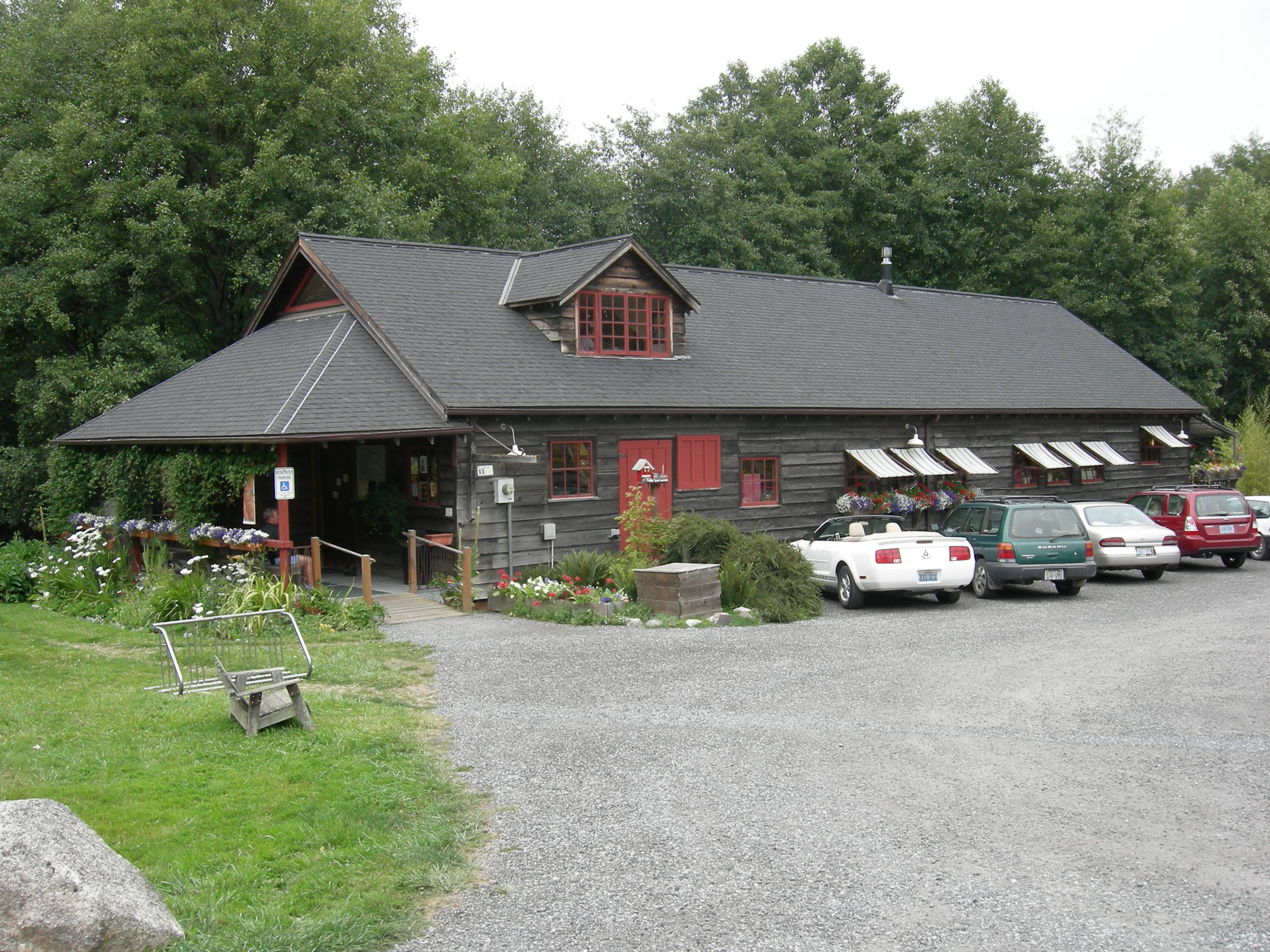
- The Strawberry Barreling Plant in Olga, now a cafe and art galleries

- Location within the state of Washington
- Coordinates: 48°37′10″N 122°50′08″W
- Country: United States
- State: Washington
- County: San Juan
- Founded: 1860
- Elevation: 39 ft (12 m)
- Time zone: UTC-8 (Pacific (PST))
  - Summer (DST): UTC-7 (PDT)
- ZIP code: 98279
- GNIS feature ID: 1511204

Olga is a waterfront unincorporated community on Orcas Island in San Juan County, Washington, United States.

== History ==
Olga was founded in 1860, after William Moore homesteaded the region. The Olga post office opened in 1890, with Hibbard Stone serving as postmaster. Olga is named after the mother of the first storekeeper of the area, John Ohlert.

== Climate ==
Climate data for Olga, Washington
Month	Jan	Feb	Mar	Apr	May	Jun	Jul	Aug	Sep	Oct	Nov	Dec	Year
Record high °F (°C)	65 (18)	66 (19)	76 (24)	78 (26)	87 (31)	89 (32)	93 (34)	89 (32)	87 (31)	77 (25)	67 (19)	65 (18)	93 (34)
Mean daily maximum °F (°C)	44.2 (6.8)	47.3 (8.5)	51.1 (10.6)	56.6 (13.7)	62.1 (16.7)	66.4 (19.1)	70.0 (21.1)	69.7 (20.9)	65.4 (18.6)	57.5 (14.2)	49.8 (9.9)	45.6 (7.6)	57.1 (13.9)
Daily mean °F (°C)	39.4 (4.1)	41.6 (5.3)	44.4 (6.9)	48.6 (9.2)	53.3 (11.8)	57.2 (14.0)	60.0 (15.6)	60.0 (15.6)	56.8 (13.8)	50.8 (10.4)	44.4 (6.9)	40.8 (4.9)	49.8 (9.9)
Mean daily minimum °F (°C)	34.5 (1.4)	35.8 (2.1)	37.6 (3.1)	40.6 (4.8)	44.5 (6.9)	48.0 (8.9)	50.0 (10.0)	50.3 (10.2)	48.1 (8.9)	44.0 (6.7)	39.1 (3.9)	36.0 (2.2)	42.4 (5.8)
Record low °F (°C)	−8 (−22)	−4 (−20)	10 (−12)	28 (−2)	31 (−1)	37 (3)	40 (4)	38 (3)	32 (0)	26 (−3)	4 (−16)	2 (−17)	−8 (−22)
Average precipitation inches (mm)	3.91 (99)	2.79 (71)	2.41 (61)	1.89 (48)	1.60 (41)	1.33 (34)	0.81 (21)	1.02 (26)	1.68 (43)	2.93 (74)	4.24 (108)	4.35 (110)	28.95 (735)
Average snowfall inches (cm)	2.5 (6.4)	1.6 (4.1)	0.7 (1.8)	0 (0)	0 (0)	0 (0)	0 (0)	0 (0)	0 (0)	0 (0)	0.5 (1.3)	1.3 (3.3)	6.7 (17)
Average precipitation days (≥ 0.01 in)	16	13	14	11	9	8	5	6	8	13	16	17	135
Source: WRCC (normals 1891-present)
