= Orcas Island =

Largest of the San Juan Islands, in Washington state, USA

Nickname: Gem of the San Juan Islands
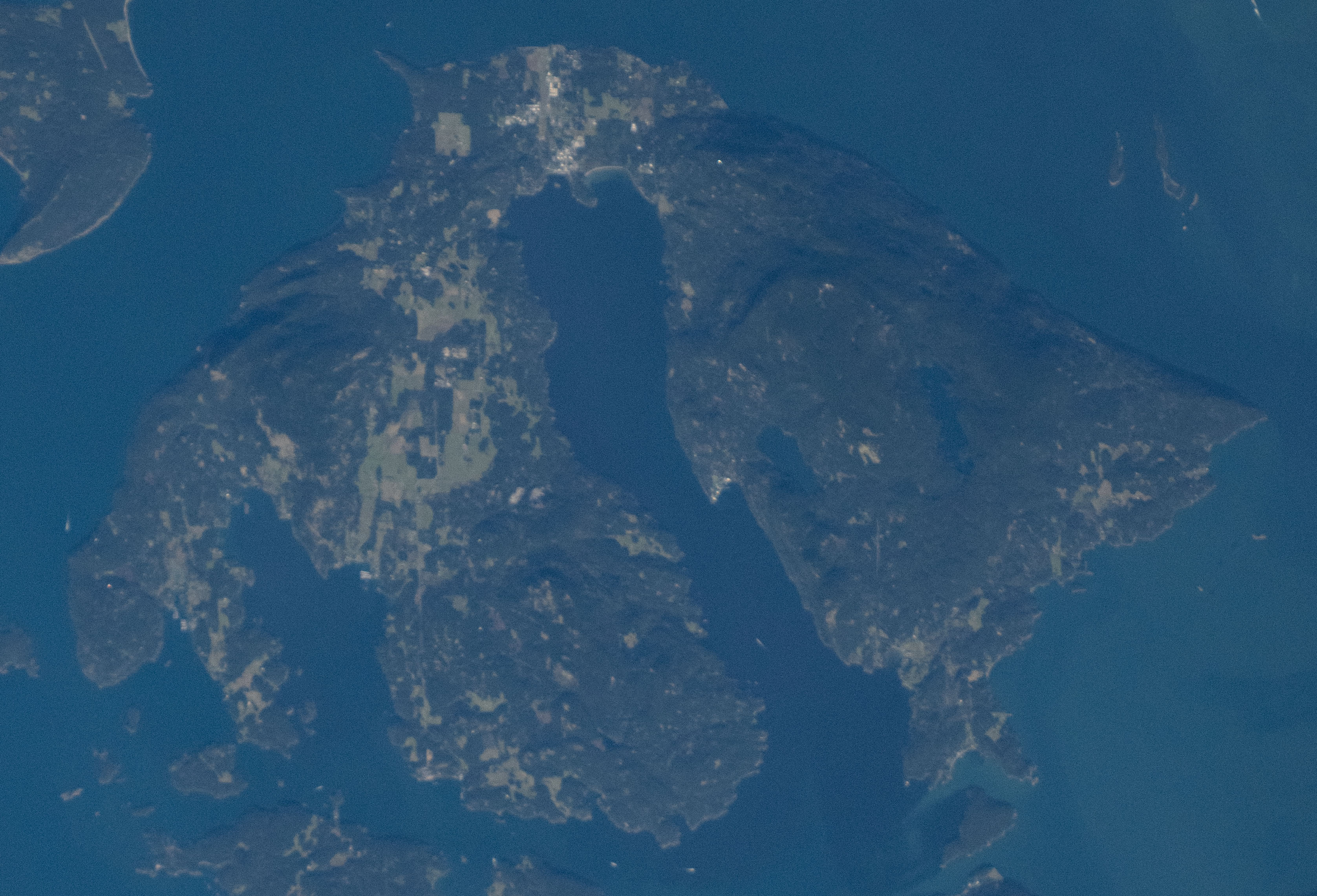
- View from Expedition 72, October 2024

- Location of Orcas Island in the San Juan Islands

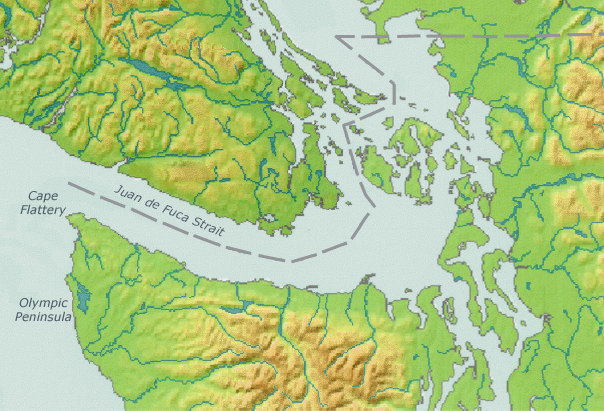
- Location within Strait of Juan de Fuca Location within Washington (state) Location within the United States

Geography
- Location: Pacific Northwest
- Coordinates: 48°40′N 122°56′W
- Archipelago: San Juan Islands
- Area: 57.3 sq mi (148 km^{2})
- Highest elevation: 2,409 ft (734.3 m)
- Highest point: Mount Constitution

Administration
- United States
- State: Washington
- County: San Juan
- Largest settlement: Eastsound

Demographics
- Population: 5,387 (2010)
- Pop. density: 30.09/km^{2} (77.93/sq mi)

Orcas Island (/ˈɔːrkəs/) is the largest of the San Juan Islands of the Pacific Northwest, in northwestern Washington, United States.

== History ==
The name "Orcas" is a shortened form of Horcasitas, from Juan Vicente de Güemes Padilla Horcasitas y Aguayo, 2nd Count of Revillagigedo, the Viceroy of New Spain who sent an exploration expedition under Francisco de Eliza to the Pacific Northwest in 1791. During the voyage, Eliza explored part of the San Juan Islands. He did not apply the name Orcas specifically to Orcas Island, but rather to part of the archipelago. In 1847, Henry Kellett assigned the name to Orcas Island during his reorganization of the British Admiralty charts. Kellett's work eliminated the patriotically American names that Charles Wilkes had given to many features of the San Juans during the Wilkes Expedition of 1838–1842. Wilkes had named Orcas Island "Hull Island" after Commodore Isaac Hull. Other features of Orcas Island Wilkes named include "Ironsides Inlet" for East Sound and "Guerrier Bay" for West Sound. One of the names Wilkes gave remains: Mount Constitution. Wilkes' names follow a pattern: Hull was the commander of "Old Ironsides" (the USS Constitution) and won fame after capturing the British warship HMS Guerriere in the War of 1812. The islands were first claimed by Spain, then by Britain, who agreed, in the Treaty of Ghent signed after the War of 1812, that everything below the 49th parallel was part of the US. The Oregon territory, which then included Washington state and this island, was used jointly by the US and Britain until 1848, but border disputes specifically concerning the San Juan Islands, including the Pig War (1859), were not settled until 1871.

== Geography ==
With an area of 57.3 square miles (148 km^{2}) and a population of 6000 (2020 census), Orcas Island is slightly larger, and less populous, than neighboring San Juan Island. It is shaped like a pair of saddlebags, separated by fjord-like Eastsound, and two prominent bays, Westsound and Deer Harbor, on the southwest side. At the island's northern end is the village of Eastsound, the largest population center on Orcas and the second largest in San Juan County.

Other, smaller hamlets on the island include Orcas Landing (where the inter-island/mainland ferry lands), West Sound (with Eastsound addresses), Deer Harbor, Rosario (with Eastsound addresses), Olga and Doe Bay.

== Transportation ==
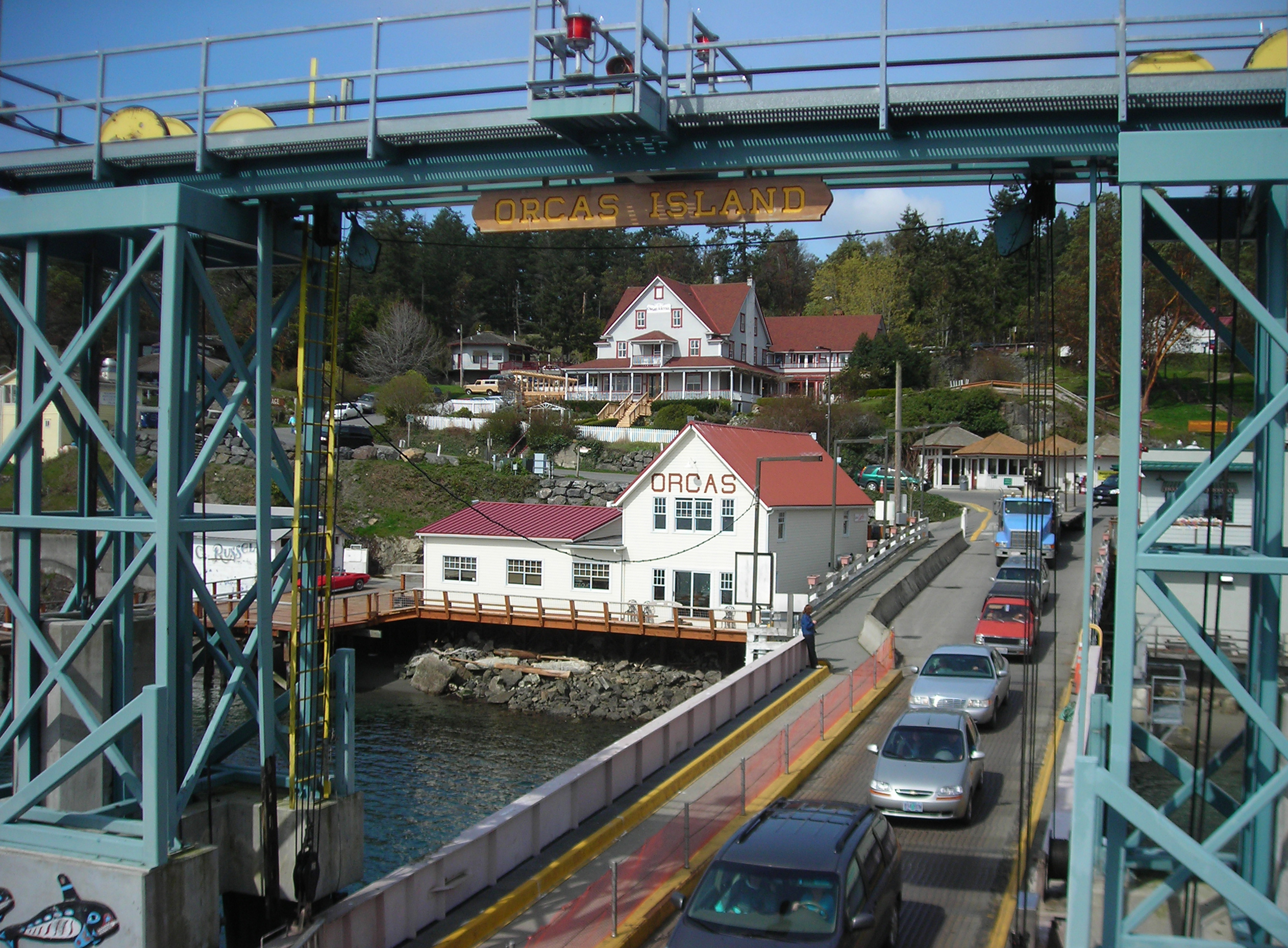
Ferry landing at Orcas

The state supports island access through the Washington State Ferries system. In addition, the island can be accessed through a variety of air, seaplane and sea charter services. Private watercraft can use public docks located near the villages around the island, and various public shoreline access points. During the summer season, there is an island shuttle van that runs from the ferry landing to Eastsound and other points.

== Arts and culture ==
The island is home to two museums. The Orcas Island Historical Museum is located in downtown Eastsound and is the only object-based, interpretive heritage facility for the island, with a permanent collection containing approximately 6000 objects, paper documents and photographs. Crow Valley School Museum is a one-room school house built in 1888, open by appointment only.

Rosario Resort was built beginning in 1906 by Robert Moran, a former mayor of Seattle and a shipbuilder. Constructed in an Arts & Crafts style, the 5-story resort was named after the Rosario Strait and contains a two-story German-style organ, operational since 1913, consisting of over 1,900 pipes. Also known as the Rosario Resort and Spa, it opened as such in 1960 and the hotel was also designed with a nautical style, containing stained glass windows, a Tiffany chandelier, and two libraries. The 82-acre (33 ha) grounds were designed with paths and water features. Moran sold the resort in 1938 and several owners have overseen operations since.

Orcas Island is home to YMCA Camp Orkila.

The Islands' Sounder, originally named the Orcas Sounder, is a weekly newspaper published in Eastsound since 1964.

== Public services ==
The Orcas Island School District operates three schools on a single campus: Orcas Island Elementary School housed in the island's historic Nellie S. Milton school building; Orcas Island Middle School; and Orcas Island High School. All of the island's public schools are located in Eastsound.

The Orcas Island Public Library is located in Eastsound and serves a population of approximately 6,000 card holders. The Orcas Island Library District is a junior-taxing district that funds the Orcas Island Public Library's operating budget through property taxes. The annual Library Fair sells books donated by Orcas Island residents and visitors, the proceeds of which are donated back to the Library's operating budget.

In 2018 Orcas Island Voters approved the creation of San Juan County Public Hospital District #3 (OIHCD) and later elected five Commissioners to the board. OIHCD funds local health care services ensuring care services to locals.

== Parks ==
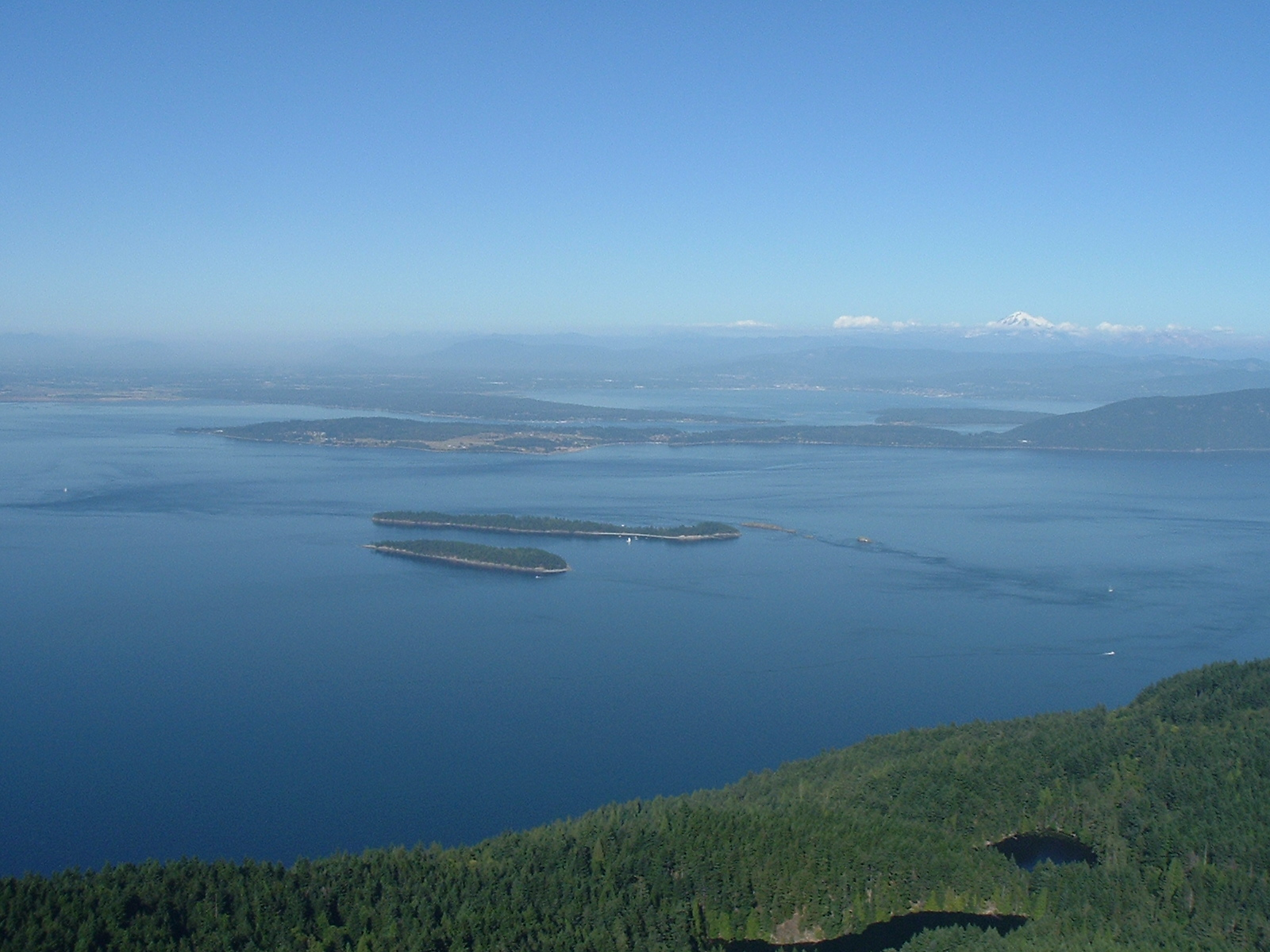
View eastward from Mount Constitution over the Rosario Strait with Mount Baker visible

Mount Constitution (elevation 2,409 feet (734 meters) is the highest point in the San Juan islands. The mountain is part of Moran State Park, the largest public recreation area in the San Juan Islands, and the largest State Park in Washington. Moran State Park encompasses over 5,000 acres (2,000 hectares) of woodland and has several lakes, including Cascade Lake, Mountain Lake, Summit Lake, and Twin Lakes, and numerous waterfalls.

Obstruction Pass State Park is an 76-acre park with access to more than a mile of public saltwater shoreline on the south end of Orcas Island, south of Moran State Park.

Madrona Point is a traditional burial ground which was controversially sold by the Cemetery Association in 1890. In 1989, the site was purchased out of private ownership for $2.2 million provided by the Department of the Interior. The site was returned to the Lummi Nation. The tribe agreed to manage the property as an open space open to individuals and groups under a memorandum of understanding with San Juan County. The Lummi Nation closed the site in 2007 citing disrespect to the land.

The Village Green is located in the center of Eastsound village. Buck Park is just north of the school on Mt. Baker Road.

== In popular culture ==
Two films use Orcas Island as a backdrop. The 2011 film Your Sister's Sister starring Emily Blunt was partially filmed on Orcas Island. While the 2022 Netflix Original film Lou is set on Orcas Island, it was not filmed on the island. In The Terminal List, Secretary of State Lorraine Hartley's palatial family estate is located on Orcas Island.

The 2017 video game What Remains of Edith Finch takes place on the island.
