= San Juan County, Washington =

County in Washington, United States

- County
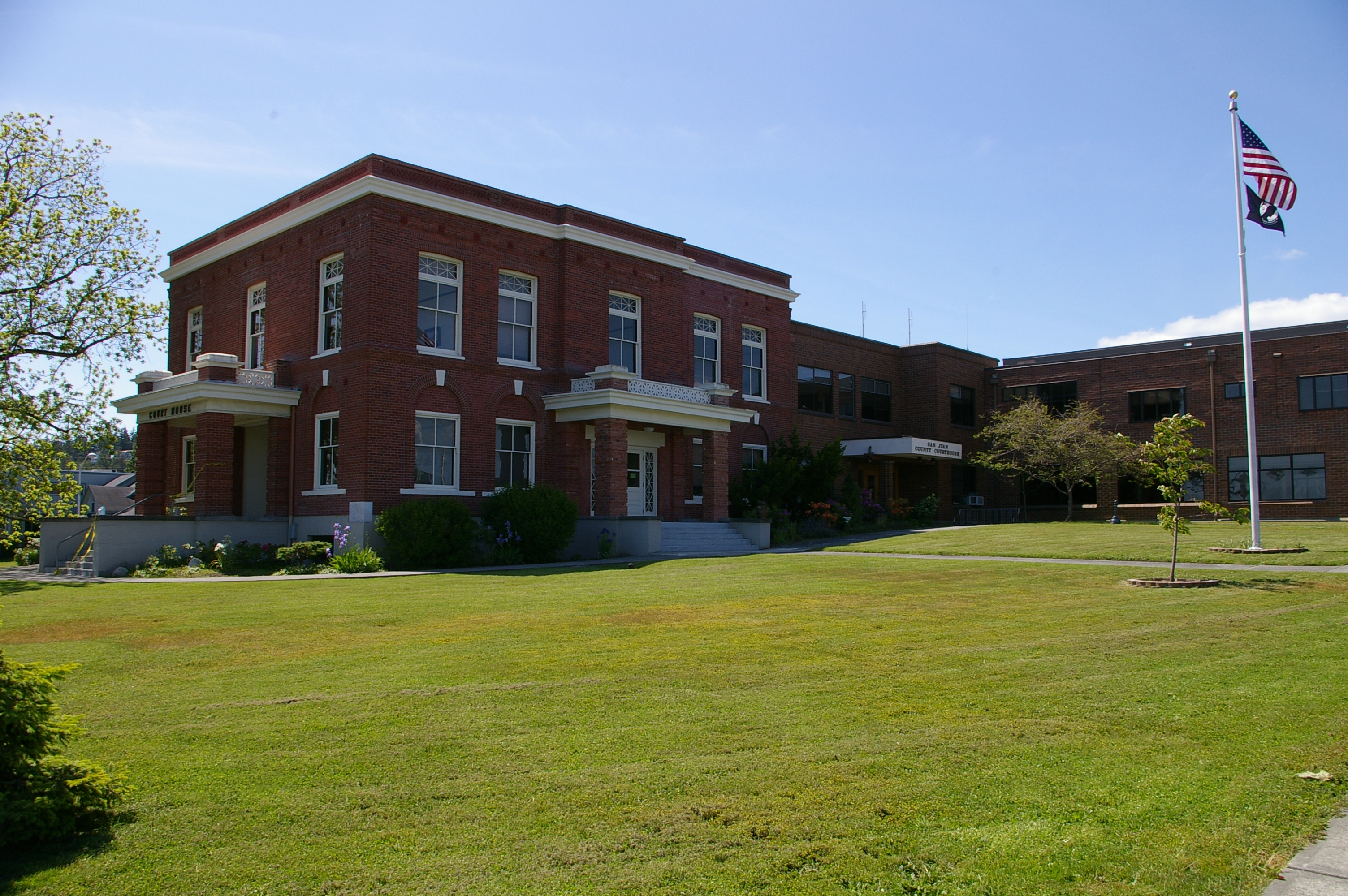
- San Juan County Courthouse

- Flag
- Motto: A World Away
- Location within the U.S. state of Washington
- Coordinates: 48°34′N 122°58′W
- Country: United States
- State: Washington
- Founded: October 31, 1873
- Named for: San Juan Islands
- Seat: Friday Harbor
- Largest town: Friday Harbor

Area
  - Total: 621 sq mi (1,610 km^{2})
  - Land: 174 sq mi (450 km^{2})
  - Water: 447 sq mi (1,160 km^{2}) 72%

Population (2020)
  - Total: 17,788
  - Estimate (2025): 18,577 ▲
  - Density: 96/sq mi (37/km^{2})
- Time zone: UTC−8 (Pacific)
  - Summer (DST): UTC−7 (PDT)
- Congressional district: 2nd
- Website: sanjuancountywa.gov

San Juan County is a county in the Salish Sea in the far northwestern corner of the U.S. state of Washington. As of the 2020 census, its population was 17,788. The county seat and only incorporated town is Friday Harbor, on San Juan Island. The county was formed on October 31, 1873, from Whatcom County and is named for the San Juan Islands, which are in turn named for Juan Vicente de Güemes, 2nd Count of Revillagigedo, the Viceroy of New Spain.

Although the islands have no state highways, the ferry routes serving them are designated as part of the state highway system.

== History ==
The San Juan Islands were the subject of a territorial dispute between Great Britain and the United States from 1846 to 1872, leading to the Pig War in 1859. The bloodless conflict ended through arbitration led by Kaiser Wilhelm I, which awarded the islands to the United States. San Juan County was home to Henry Cayou, one of the first elected officials of Native descent in Washington.

On June 7, 2024, a T-34 plane flown by former astronaut and Air Force pilot William Anders crashed in the San Juan Islands. Anders did not survive the crash.

== Geography ==
According to the United States Census Bureau, the county has a total area of 621 square miles (1,610 km^{2}), of which 174 square miles (450 km^{2}) is land and 447 square miles (1,160 km^{2}) (72%) is water. It is the smallest county in Washington by land area and fourth-smallest by total area.

San Juan County is a cluster of more than 400 islands and rocks with elevations above mean high tide. 134 of these islands and rocks are named. The county has a rugged, rocky shoreline and several mountains. The highest point in the county is Mount Constitution on Orcas Island at 2,407 feet (734 m) above sea level.

=== Geographic features ===
- Boundary Pass
- Haro Strait
- Rosario Strait
- San Juan Islands
- Strait of Georgia
- Strait of Juan de Fuca

=== Major islands ===
There are approximately 743 islands and rocks in the San Juan Island chain. Most of the county's population lives on the largest four islands, which are the only county islands served by the Washington State Ferries. The four largest islands are:

- Orcas Island (149.43 km^{2}; 57.70 sq mi)
- San Juan Island (143.62 km^{2}; 55.45 sq mi)
- Lopez Island (76.57 km^{2}; 29.56 sq mi)
- Shaw Island (19.64 km^{2}; 7.58 sq mi)
- Blakely Island
- Crane Island
- Decatur Island

=== Adjacent counties ===
- Whatcom County – northeast
- Skagit County – east
- Island County – southeast
- Jefferson County – south
- Clallam County – south/southwest
- Capital Regional District, British Columbia – west

=== National protected areas ===
- San Juan Island National Historical Park
- San Juan Islands National Wildlife Refuge
- San Juan Islands National Monument
- San Juan Wilderness

== Demographics ==
Historical population
Census	Pop.	Note	%±
1870	554		—
1880	948		71.1%
1890	2,072		118.6%
1900	2,928		41.3%
1910	3,603		23.1%
1920	3,605		0.1%
1930	3,097		−14.1%
1940	3,157		1.9%
1950	3,245		2.8%
1960	2,872		−11.5%
1970	3,856		34.3%
1980	7,838		103.3%
1990	10,035		28.0%
2000	14,077		40.3%
2010	15,769		12.0%
2020	17,788		12.8%
2025 (est.)	18,577	▲	4.4%
U.S. Decennial Census; 1790–1960 1900–1990; 1990–2000 2010–2020

The county's population grew from around 4,000 in 1970 to nearly 19,000 by 2022, including a significant contingent of remote workers. Due to high housing costs, San Juan County has the highest income inequality rate in Washington.

=== 2020 census ===
As of the 2020 census, the county had a population of 17,788. Of the residents, 14.2% were under the age of 18 and 34.3% were 65 years of age or older; the median age was 56.1 years. For every 100 females there were 95.1 males, and for every 100 females age 18 and over there were 94.9 males. 19.9% of residents lived in urban areas and 80.1% lived in rural areas.

2.8% of the population were under the age of 5.

The population density was 102.3 people per square mile (39.5 people/km^{2}).

San Juan County, Washington – Racial and ethnic composition Note: the US Census treats Hispanic/Latino as an ethnic category. This table excludes Latinos from the racial categories and assigns them to a separate category. Hispanics/Latinos may be of any race.
Race / Ethnicity (NH = Non-Hispanic)	Pop 2000	Pop 2010	Pop 2020	% 2000	% 2010	% 2020
White alone (NH)	13,187	14,228	15,024	93.68%	90.23%	84.46%
Black or African American alone (NH)	34	49	48	0.24%	0.31%	0.27%
Native American or Alaska Native alone (NH)	109	84	92	0.77%	0.53%	0.52%
Asian alone (NH)	125	179	224	0.89%	1.14%	1.26%
Pacific Islander alone (NH)	11	14	23	0.08%	0.09%	0.13%
Other race alone (NH)	18	35	122	0.13%	0.22%	0.69%
Mixed race or Multiracial (NH)	255	323	957	1.81%	2.05%	5.38%
Hispanic or Latino (any race)	338	857	1,298	2.40%	5.43%	7.30%
Total	14,077	15,769	17,788	100.00%	100.00%	100.00%

The racial makeup of the county was 85.9% White, 0.3% Black or African American, 0.6% American Indian and Alaska Native, 1.3% Asian, 3.5% from some other race, and 8.3% from two or more races. Hispanic or Latino residents of any race comprised 7.3% of the population.

There were 8,446 households in the county, of which 18.4% had children under the age of 18 living with them and 24.9% had a female householder with no spouse or partner present. About 32.1% of all households were made up of individuals and 17.5% had someone living alone who was 65 years of age or older.

There were 13,772 housing units, of which 38.7% were vacant. Among occupied housing units, 73.8% were owner-occupied and 26.2% were renter-occupied. The homeowner vacancy rate was 1.8% and the rental vacancy rate was 6.2%.

The median household income was $68,577, and the per capita income was $52,881. 10.8% of the population were below the poverty line.

=== 2010 census ===
As of the 2010 census, there were 15,769 people, 7,613 households, and 4,438 families residing in the county. The population density was 90.7 people per square mile (35.0 people/km^{2}). There were 13,313 housing units at an average density of 76.5 units per square mile (29.5 units/km^{2}). The racial makeup of the county was 92.6% white, 1.1% Asian, 0.7% American Indian, 0.3% black or African American, 0.1% Pacific islander, 2.6% from other races, and 2.5% from two or more races. Those of Hispanic or Latino origin made up 5.4% of the population. The largest ancestry groups were:

- 19.6% German
- 19.3% English
- 14.1% Irish
- 5.6% Norwegian
- 5.6% Scottish
- 5.0% French
- 4.4% Swedish
- 4.2% Mexican
- 3.6% Italian
- 3.1% Scotch-Irish
- 2.9% Dutch
- 2.8% American
- 2.1% Welsh
- 1.8% Polish
- 1.7% Russian
- 1.6% Danish
- 1.4% British
- 1.1% Swiss
- 1.0% Canadian

Of the 7,613 households, 19.3% had children under the age of 18 living with them, 48.3% were married couples living together, 6.6% had a female householder with no husband present, 41.7% were non-families, and 34.0% of all households were made up of individuals. The average household size was 2.05 and the average family size was 2.56. The median age was 52.7 years.

The median income for a household in the county was $50,726 and the median income for a family was $61,096. Males had a median income of $44,190 versus $32,911 for females. The per capita income for the county was $35,487. About 7.6% of families and 10.1% of the population were below the poverty line, including 13.3% of those under age 18 and 5.2% of those age 65 or over.

=== 2000 census ===
As of the 2000 census there were 14,077 people living in the county in 6,466 households and 4,015 families, resulting in a population density of 80 people per square mile (31 people/km^{2}). The census reported 9,752 housing units at an average density of 56 units per square mile (22 units/km^{2}). The residents of the county reported their race as 95.0% White, 0.3% Black or African American, 0.8% Native American, 0.9% Asian, 0.1% Pacific Islander, 0.9% from other races, and 2.0% from two or more races. 2.4% of the population identified themselves as Hispanic or Latino of any race. In response to the census question concerning ancestry, 16.7% reported English ancestry; 15.0%, German; 11.6%, Irish; 5.7%, United States or American; 5.4%, French; and 5.0%, Norwegian.

Of the 6,466 households, 22.90% had children under the age of 18; 51.80% were married couples living together; 6.90% had a female householder with no husband present; 37.90% were not families; 30.60% were individuals; and 10.70% were individuals 65 years of age or older, living alone. The average household size was 2.16 persons and the average family size was 2.65.

19.1% of the county's population was under the age of 18; 4.5% ranged in age from 18 to 24; 21.7%, 25–44; 35.7%, 45–64; and 19.0%, 65 or older. The median age was 47 years. For every 100 females, there were 95.10 males. For every 100 females age 18 and over, there were 93.00 males.

The median income for a household in the county was $43,491, and the median income for a family was $51,835. Males had a median income of $36,250 versus $26,516 for females. The per capita income for the county was $30,603. About 6.0% of families and 9.2% of the population were below the poverty line, including 12.4% of those under age 18 and 3.1% of those age 65 or over.

San Juan County has the highest per capita income in the state of Washington. Deer Harbor, located in the county, has a per capita income exceeding $100,000. Waldron Island, with a population of 104 in the 2000 census, is considered one of the most impoverished areas in Washington, with about 56% of the people living in poverty.

In a survey by the University of Wisconsin Population Health Institute and the Robert Wood Johnson Foundation, San Juan County was ranked the healthiest in the state of Washington.

=== Religion ===
According to a 2020 survey by the Public Religion Research Institute, San Juan County has the highest concentration of religiously unaffiliated people of any county in the United States. The unaffiliated make up 49% of the population.

== Law enforcement ==
The San Juan County Sheriff's Office is responsible for maintaining the county jail, providing security at the San Juan County Superior Court, serving civil processes, coordinating emergency management among the county's emergency services, and maintaining law and order throughout the county, as there are no municipal police departments in San Juan County. Due to San Juan County's island geography, the sheriff also operates a robust marine unit equipped with four small patrol craft, used for search and rescue and for transporting deputies and prisoners to and from remote islands. The sheriff has a mutual aid agreement with the National Park Service Law Enforcement Rangers assigned to the San Juan Island National Historical Park and, in the event of an exigency, can also request assistance from the Washington State Patrol's District 7 field detachment.

The county's first sheriff was Stephen Boyce, who was known among area Native Americans as Hyas Tyee ("great and powerful man" in Chinook Jargon). Boyce helped investigate the sensational "Kanaka Joe" murders of 1873, and supervised the hanging of Joe "Kanaka Joe" Nuanna.

Stephen Boyce, San Juan County's first sheriff.

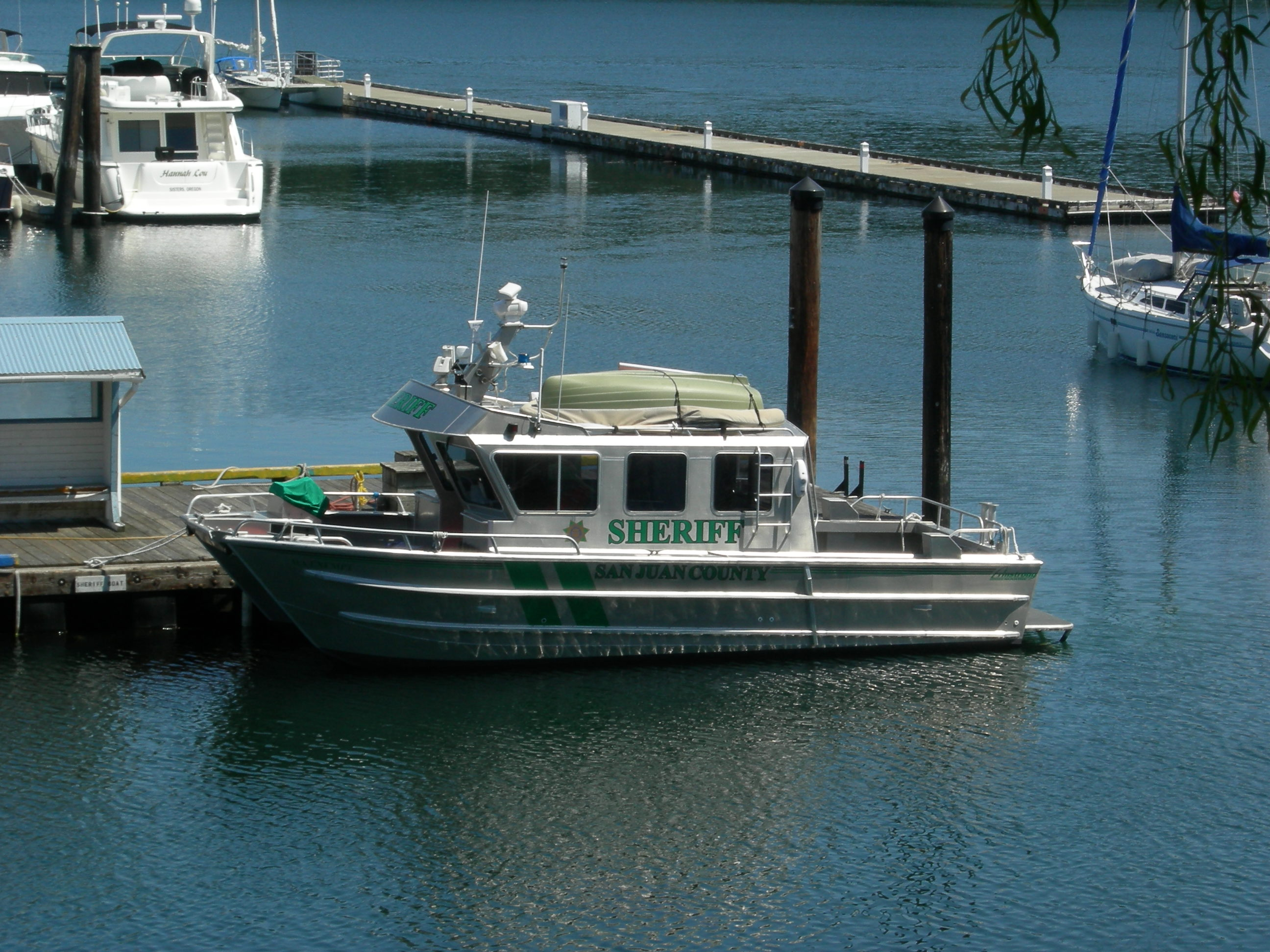
A San Juan County sheriff's office patrol boat photographed in 2009.

== Government and politics ==
United States presidential election results for San Juan County, Washington
Year	Republican		Democratic		Third party(ies)	
Year	No.	%	No.	%	No.	%
1892	348	54.89%	226	35.65%	60	9.46%
1896	411	58.30%	291	41.28%	3	0.43%
1900	428	61.49%	245	35.20%	23	3.30%
1904	554	71.95%	113	14.68%	103	13.38%
1908	581	65.95%	178	20.20%	122	13.85%
1912	341	27.52%	311	25.10%	587	47.38%
1916	591	42.37%	669	47.96%	135	9.68%
1920	833	66.64%	196	15.68%	221	17.68%
1924	744	66.67%	86	7.71%	286	25.63%
1928	814	66.72%	400	32.79%	6	0.49%
1932	607	40.44%	786	52.37%	108	7.20%
1936	690	43.26%	775	48.59%	130	8.15%
1940	808	48.24%	860	51.34%	7	0.42%
1944	703	51.92%	644	47.56%	7	0.52%
1948	881	55.94%	636	40.38%	58	3.68%
1952	1,133	64.16%	619	35.05%	14	0.79%
1956	1,105	65.27%	584	34.49%	4	0.24%
1960	1,112	63.91%	624	35.86%	4	0.23%
1964	839	47.94%	906	51.77%	5	0.29%
1968	1,164	59.30%	685	34.90%	114	5.81%
1972	1,786	63.90%	906	32.42%	103	3.69%
1976	1,998	53.68%	1,467	39.41%	257	6.90%
1980	2,363	46.97%	1,666	33.11%	1,002	19.92%
1984	2,900	52.48%	2,514	45.49%	112	2.03%
1988	2,660	45.75%	3,008	51.74%	146	2.51%
1992	1,901	26.71%	3,353	47.11%	1,863	26.18%
1996	2,523	34.31%	3,663	49.81%	1,168	15.88%
2000	3,005	35.74%	4,426	52.65%	976	11.61%
2004	3,290	32.61%	6,589	65.32%	209	2.07%
2008	2,958	28.09%	7,374	70.02%	199	1.89%
2012	3,111	29.37%	7,125	67.26%	358	3.38%
2016	2,688	24.14%	7,172	64.42%	1,274	11.44%
2020	3,057	23.16%	9,725	73.69%	415	3.14%
2024	2,890	22.22%	9,539	73.34%	577	4.44%

The county has voted heavily Democratic in presidential elections since the 1990s. The only area of the county won by George W. Bush in 2004 was the Decatur Island/Blakely Island precinct, which had just over 50 votes cast. Waldron Island's precinct voted 96.5% for John Kerry. In 2006, Maria Cantwell, the Democrat running for re-election to the U.S. Senate, won all precincts. The county's legislative body is the San Juan County Council, which was created in 2006. In 2024, the county did not swing rightward like the nation, and Democratic nominee Kamala Harris even improved upon Joe Biden's margin in the county.

The county government adopted a 32-hour workweek for its approximately 160 employees in August 2023 to address chronic vacancies and the difficulty of the island lifestyle; the lone exception was the county sheriff's office. Benefits and overall pay were retained through a deal with the employees' union by raising the hourly wage. In the first nine months under the policy, vacancies were filled faster and fewer sick days were used by employees.

== Transportation ==
San Juan County is connected to the rest of Washington by the state ferry system, which operates the Anacortes–San Juan Islands ferry. The ferry's runs include inter-island service as well as bypass runs that serve only Friday Harbor and Anacortes. It also included service to Sidney, British Columbia, but that was suspended in 2020. Due to high demand, vehicle spaces on the ferry runs generally require reservations during the summer months.

A public transit system, named San Juan Transit, was established in 1993 and primarily operates buses on San Juan Island for residents and visitors.

== Communities ==
=== Town ===
- Friday Harbor (county seat)

=== Census-designated place ===
- Roche Harbor

=== Unincorporated communities ===
- Argyle
- Beach Haven
- Buckhorn
- Camp Orkila
- Decatur
- Deer Harbor
- Doe Bay
- Eastsound
- Islandale
- Lakedale
- Olga
- Orcas Village
- Port Stanley
- Prevost
- Pump Station
- Richardson
- Rockland
- Rosario
- Sea Acre
- Thatcher
- The Tee
- Waldron
- West Beach
- West Sound
- Yacht Haven

== Education ==
San Juan County has four school districts that provide public education to K–12 students: the Lopez School District, Orcas Island School District, San Juan Island School District, and Shaw Island School District.

== See also ==
- National Register of Historic Places listings in San Juan County, Washington
