= KORS =

KORS or Kors may refer to:

- Orcas Island Airport (ICAO code: KORS), an airport in Washington, United States
- KORS-CD, a low-power television station (channel 36) licensed to serve Salem, Oregon, United States
- KORS, a Russian shoe manufacturer
- Kors Church, in Rauma Municipality, Møre og Romsdal county, Norway
- Michael Kors (brand) (NASDAQ symbol: KORS), American fashion company

== See also ==
- Kors, a surname (including a list of people with the name)
