= Anacortes Airport =

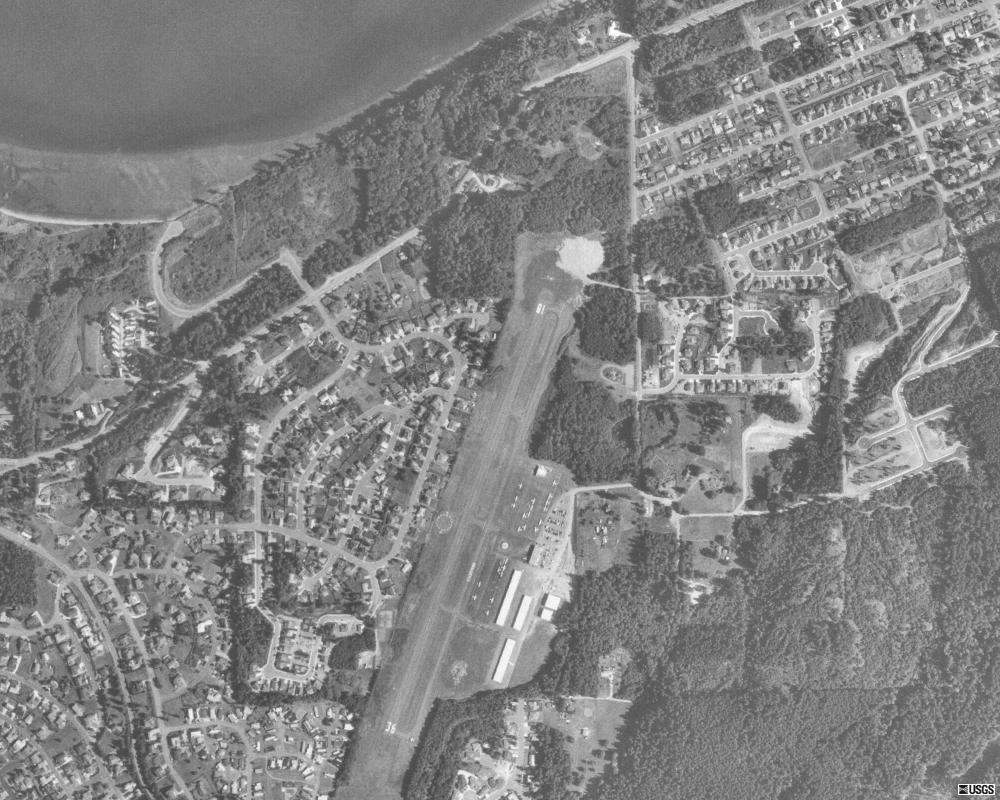
- USGS aerial image as of 21 July 1998
- IATA: OTS; ICAO: none; FAA LID: 74S

Summary
- Airport type: Public
- Owner: Port of Anacortes
- Serves: Anacortes, Washington
- Elevation AMSL: 241 ft (73 m)
- Coordinates: 48°29′56″N 122°39′45″W
- Website: portofanacortes.com/airport

Map
- Location within Washington (state) Location within the United States

Runways
Direction	Length		Surface
Direction	ft	m	Surface
18/36	3,015	919	Asphalt

Statistics
- Aircraft operations (2014): 9,000
- Based aircraft (2017): 55
- Source: Federal Aviation Administration

Anacortes Airport (IATA: OTS, FAA LID: 74S) is a public use airport located two nautical miles (3.7 km) west of the central business district of Anacortes, a city in Skagit County, Washington, United States. It is owned by the Port of Anacortes.

Many U.S. airports use the same three-letter location identifier for the FAA and IATA. However, this airport is assigned 74S by the FAA but has been assigned OTS from the IATA. It is included in the Federal Aviation Administration (FAA) National Plan of Integrated Airport Systems for 2017–2021, in which it is categorized as a local general aviation facility.

== Facilities and aircraft ==
Anacortes Airport covers an area of 120 acres (49 ha) at an elevation of 241 feet (73 m) above mean sea level. It has one runway designated 18/36 with an asphalt surface measuring 3,015 by 60 feet (919 x 18 m).

For the 12-month period ending July 31, 2014, the airport had 9,000 aircraft operations, an average of 25 per day: 73% general aviation and 17% air taxi. In July 2017, there were 55 aircraft based at this airport: 53 single-engine, 1 jet, and 1 helicopter.

== Airline and destinations ==
The airlines and its destinations are tabulated below:

Airlines	Destinations
San Juan Airlines	Eastsound, Friday Harbor, Lopez Island, Roche Harbor

== See also ==
- List of airports in Washington
