= Paine Field =

Airport in Everett, Washington, United States

Seattle Paine Field International Airport

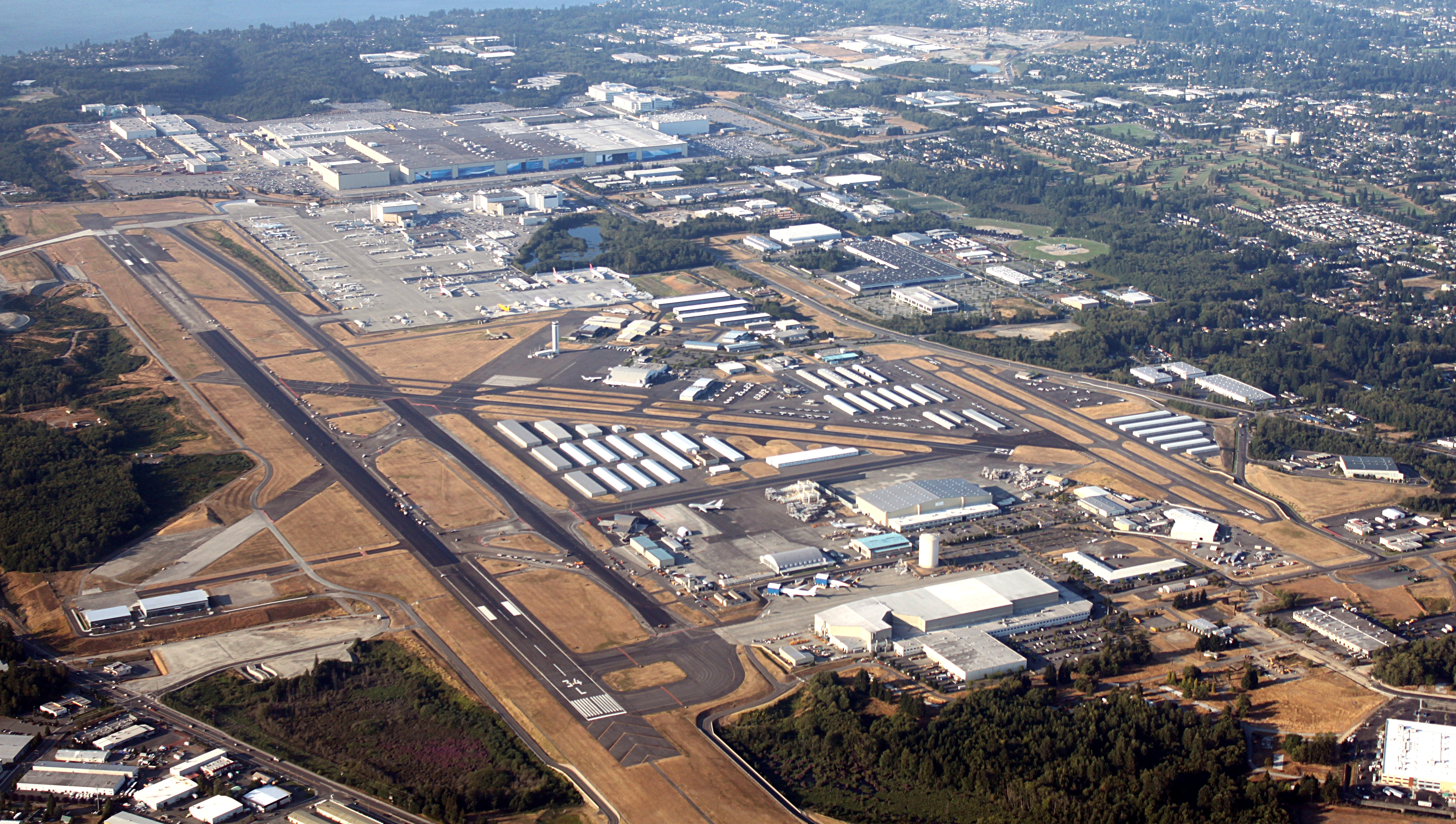
- Aerial from southwest; August 2009
- IATA: PAE; ICAO: KPAE; FAA LID: PAE

Summary
- Airport type: Public
- Owner: Snohomish County
- Serves: Seattle metropolitan area
- Location: Everett, Washington, U.S.
- Opened: 1936; 90 years ago
- Time zone: PST (UTC−08:00)
  - Summer (DST): PDT (UTC−07:00)
- Elevation AMSL: 608 ft (185 m)
- Coordinates: 47°54′22″N 122°16′53″W
- Website: www.painefield.com

Maps
- FAA diagram
- Interactive map of Seattle Paine Field International Airport

Runways
Direction	Length		Surface
Direction	ft	m	Surface
16R/34L	9,010	2,746	Concrete/Asphalt
16L/34R	3,004	916	Asphalt

Statistics (2024)
- Aircraft operations: 150,501
- Based aircraft: 486 (not finished)
- Passengers: 550,000
- Source: Federal Aviation Administration, BTS

Seattle Paine Field International Airport (IATA: PAE, ICAO: KPAE, FAA LID: PAE) — also known as Paine Field and Snohomish County Airport — is a commercial and general aviation airport serving the Seattle metropolitan area in the U.S. state of Washington. It is located in unincorporated Snohomish County, Washington, between the cities of Mukilteo and Everett, about 25 miles (40 km) north of Seattle. PAE covers 1,315 acres (2.05 mi^{2}; 5.32 km^{2}) of land.

The airport was built in 1936 by the Works Progress Administration and began commercial service in 1939. It was named for Topliff Olin Paine in 1941, shortly before the Army Air Corps began the occupation of Paine Field for military use. The airport briefly returned to civilian use from 1946 through 1950 with service by West Coast Airlines before conversion into an air force base during the Korean War. In 1966, the Boeing Company selected Paine Field for the site of its Everett assembly plant as part of the Boeing 747 program. By the 1970s, the airport had grown into a hub for light aviation and manufacturing, lacking commercial service. The county government sought to begin commercial service at Paine Field as early as the 1980s but was halted by opposition from neighboring cities.

In March 2019, Paine Field resumed commercial service at a newly constructed terminal. The Federal Aviation Administration (FAA) National Plan of Integrated Airport Systems for 2023–2027 categorized it as a non-hub primary commercial service facility.

== Description ==
Paine Field has two runways: 16R/34L and 16L/34R. 16R/34L, at 9,010 feet (2,750 m) in length, is suited for the majority of aircraft and sees occasional heavy traffic. The first 1,000 feet of runway 16R is concrete, while the remainder is asphalt. It is in very good condition. Runway 16L/34R is 3,004 feet (916 m) in length, and suitable only for small aircraft. Its pavement is in fair condition, with a noticeable rise in elevation mid-field, when compared with the ends. Runway 11-29 was decommissioned on September 10, 2020, and Boeing is leasing some of the former runway space to park partially completed aircraft. The Paine (PAE) VOR/DME is located on the field. It is unusually mounted on top of a Boeing hangar.

The airport has 456 general aviation hangars, of which 326 are leased by the County, and 130 are "condominium" hangars. Wait time for a hangar currently ranges between 6 months and 5 years, depending on type.

Paine Field is adjacent to the Boeing Everett Factory, the world's largest building by volume, and the primary assembly location for Boeing's wide-body 767 and 777, although the facility also produced the 747 and the 787, with the former ending production in 2022 and the latter being moved to Boeing South Carolina in March 2021. Paine Field is also home to Aviation Technical Services (ATS), one of the nation's largest aviation maintenance facilities. ATS operates a 950,000-square-foot (88,000 m^{2}) facility, formerly operated by Goodrich (formerly known as Tramco), and sold to ATS in the fall of 2007. ATS does 'heavy' checks for a number of airlines and cargo companies. According to their web page, they average 443 aircraft redeliveries each year.

Paine Field is home to four flight schools – Chinook Flight Simulations, Regal Air, Northway Aviation, and Everett Helicopters – making it a popular destination for flight training. There are also a number of flying clubs on the field. Paine Field leases commercial space to aviation-related and other small businesses on its property at the "IAC Building" located between the runways at the south end of the airport.

The FAA-operated control tower maintains limited hours, operating only between 7 AM and 9 PM local time. During times that the tower is operational, both runways are active, but after hours, only runway 16R-34L is open. The airport's administrative offices are located adjacent to the passenger terminal. It is scheduled to move in late February 2025 to a former Boeing training building to accommodate future expansion of the passenger terminal. The new administration building will be shared with the Snohomish County Sheriff's Office, who will locate their West Precinct on the first floor. The airport has several natural reserves and sanctuaries around its perimeter, including ponds that were certified in 2019 as Salmon-Safe. The salmon-safe area is bounded generally by Mukilteo Speedway on the west, State Route 526 ("Boeing Freeway") on the north, Airport Road (east) and Beverly Park Road on the south.

== History ==
Paine Field was originally constructed in 1936 as a Works Progress Administration project. At the time of development, it was envisioned that the Airport would create jobs and economic growth in the region by becoming one of the ten new "super airports" around the country.

Paine Field was taken over by the U.S. Army Air Corps prior to entry into World War II as a patrol, air defense, and fighter training base and was later controlled by the U.S. Army Air Forces. With the end of the war, the airfield began to be returned to the civilian control of Snohomish County. In 1947, as transition activities were still underway, military control of the then-Paine Army Airfield was transferred to the newly established U.S. Air Force, with the facility renamed Paine Field. Transfer of the property to the Snohomish County government was completed in 1948, however, the Air Force continued to maintain various Air Defense Command units at the airport as military tenants.

Before Snohomish County could start planning for the continued development of a "super airport", the United States was again involved in an armed conflict—this time in Korea and also the breakout of the Cold War with the Soviet Union. When the Pacific Northwest defense installations were reviewed House Representative Henry M. Jackson recommended more military presence in the area and Paine Field was reactivated as a military airbase.

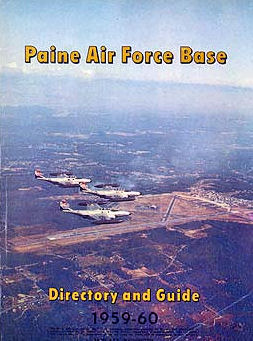
Paine AFB Directory, 1959–1960. Cover photo views the base from the northwest and showing a formation of three F-89 Scorpions overflying the airfield.

Paine Field was returned to USAF control in 1951, renamed Paine Air Force Base, and placed under the jurisdiction of the Air Defense Command (ADC). While the county relinquished most of its commercial facilities to house USAF personnel, units, and assets, the site did not have an exclusive military presence. The airfield remained a joint civil-military airport with the Air Force operating the control tower and other air traffic control facilities, while the county, in a shared-use agreement, rented commercial leasehold areas to businesses such as Alaska Airlines. The 4753rd Air Base Squadron (later re-designated the 86th Air Base Squadron) was activated on the new Air Force base on February 1, 1952, as a placeholder unit.

Although inactive for only six years, significant military construction (MILCON) was necessary to bring the World War II training base up to postwar USAF standards. In 1951, additional land surrounding the Paine AFB site was appropriated for military facilities and extended runways. A 9,000-foot jet runway (Rwy 16/34) was constructed along with accompanying taxiways, permanent concrete buildings, and other support facilities to replace the temporary wartime wooden structures that were viewed as substandard for a permanent USAF base. The 529th Air Defense Group was activated on February 16, 1953, and became the permanent host unit at Paine AFB until redesigned as the 326th Fighter Group in 1955.

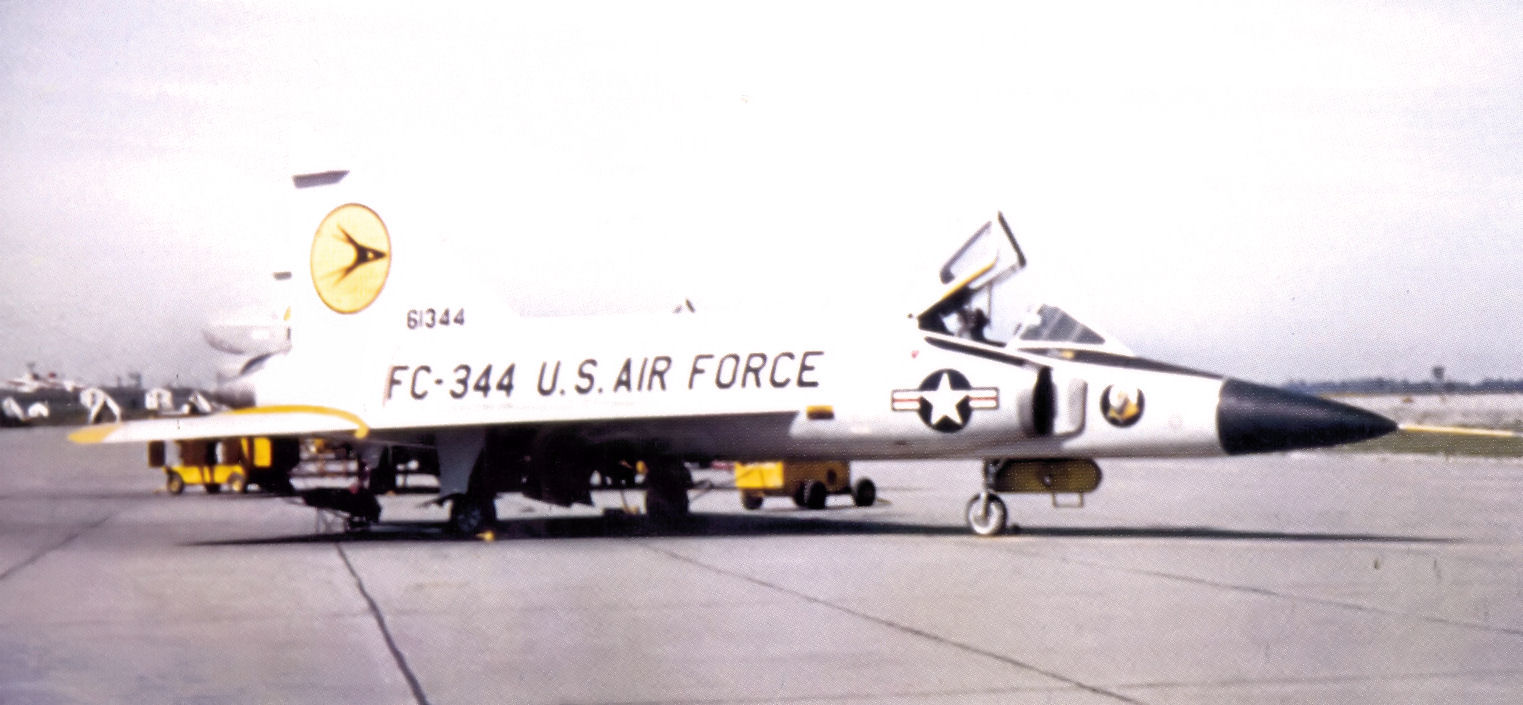
64th Fighter-Interceptor Squadron Convair F-102A-75-CO Delta Dagger 56-1344, 326th Fighter Group, March 1960

Various regular Air Force fighter-interceptor units and Air Force Reserve troop carrier units operated at Paine AFB from 1951 until the mid-1960s. In 1966, USAF identified Paine AFB for closure due to budgetary constraints caused by the cost of the Vietnam War. The by then-host unit, the 57th Fighter Group phased down operations with the departure of the interceptors and was inactivated in place on September 30, 1968. Paine AFB has inactivated on the same date and the facility was returned to full civilian control as Paine Field / Snohomish County Airport. The 215th Engineering Installation Squadron (215 EIS) of the Washington Air National Guard, formerly situated at Paine Field, was inactivated in 2013.

Paine AFB / Paine Field had also been under consideration in the 1960s by Army Air Defense Command as one of several sites for the Sentinel Anti-Ballistic Missile System due to its central location to several other major military bases and defense industries in the Puget Sound Region. Sentinel was eventually dropped in favor of the limited Safeguard system.

On July 25, 1966, Boeing announced that it would build the Boeing 747, a jet airliner capable of carrying nearly twice as many passengers as previous models. To build the giant aircraft, Boeing had to construct a facility large enough to handle the world's largest commercial jetliner. The land just north of Paine Field was chosen to construct the new facilities, including some development on the airport itself. Both the local government and the FAA concurred with the development. Work on the massive building began in August 1966 and the first employees arrived in early 1967. The 747 made its first flight at Paine Field on February 9, 1969.

In 1984, the Snohomish County Council considered legislation to rename Paine Field for Senator Henry M. Jackson, who had died a few months earlier. The proposal was put on hold after the Port of Seattle renamed Seattle–Tacoma International Airport for Jackson, which sparked public outcry and force them to revert to the original name.

In late 2005, construction of the Future of Flight Aviation Center & Boeing Tour building was completed. The project, formerly known as the National Flight Interpretive Center, includes the Boeing factory tour as well as a gallery that highlights the newest developments in aviation, including both parts and components of airplanes, manufactured by Airbus and Boeing. The facility was opened to a private audience on December 16, 2005, and the following day the facility was open to the public. The Museum of Flight also has a restoration center at the airport's main gate; located further south is the Me 262 Project. Paul Allen's Flying Heritage & Combat Armor Museum has a large, refurbished hangar at the south end of the field, which opened as a museum in June 2008. The Historic Flight Foundation also housed and maintained early military aircraft. However, the Flying Heritage & Combat Armor Museum closed in May 2020 as a result of the COVID-19 pandemic and in April 2022 it was reported that the collection was sold and the museum would not re-open. The Historic Flight Foundation closed their museum at Paine Field in 2020 as well, with their museum at Felts Field in Spokane, Washington now being their only location.

=== Commercial service proposals and debate ===
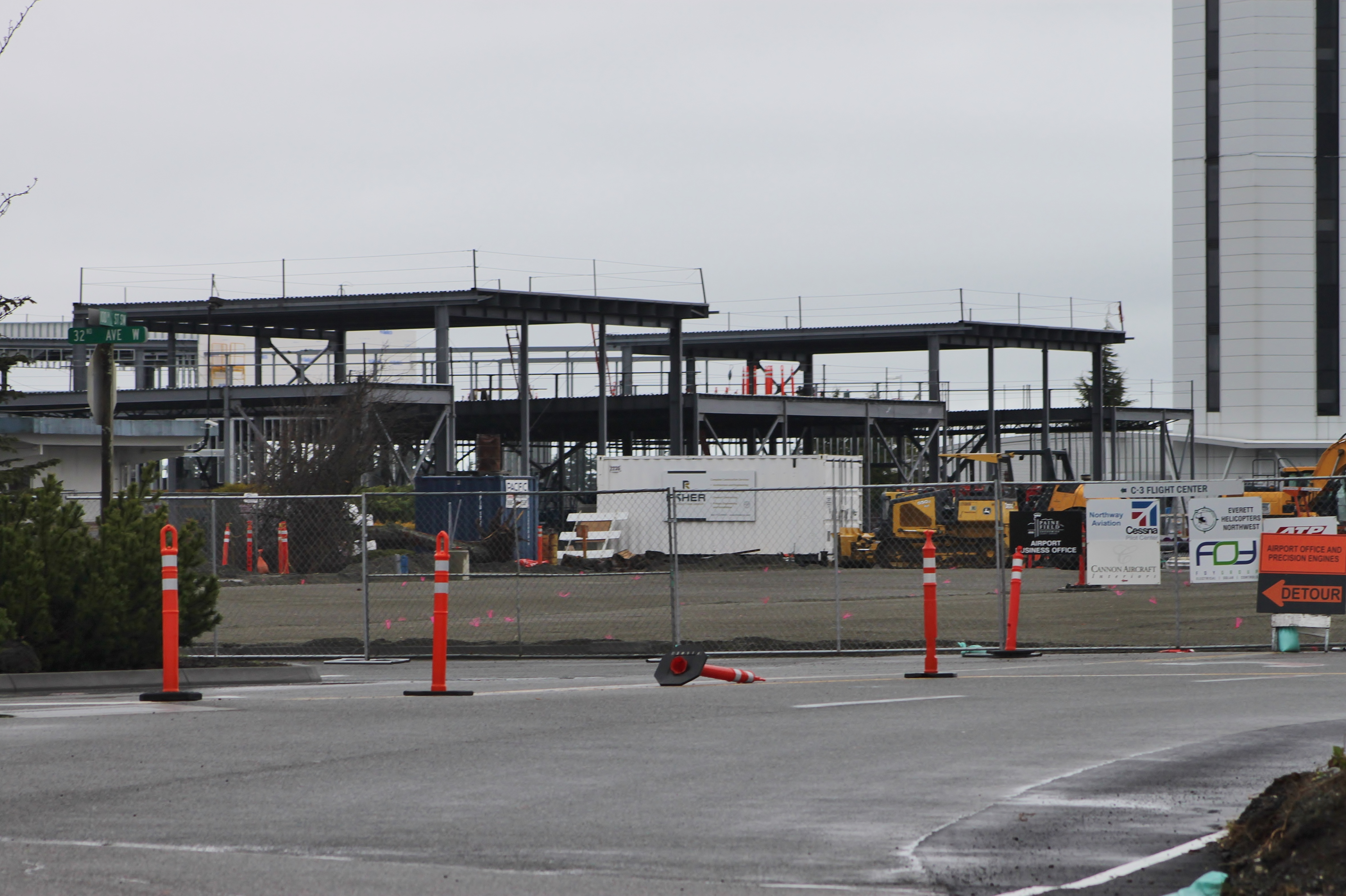
Construction of the passenger terminal, seen in early 2018

The use of Paine Field for commercial air service is highly controversial.

Several local governments have adopted resolutions against the use of Paine Field for commercial flights including Snohomish County (the airport's operator), the neighboring cities of Brier, Edmonds, Lynnwood, Mountlake Terrace, Mukilteo, and Woodway. Additionally, a local citizens group called "Save Our Communities" has worked to oppose any commercial flights at the airport.

Notably, the city of Everett, the largest in the county and the county seat, has adopted a resolution in favor of the use of Paine Field for commercial air service.

The use and expansion of the airport is currently governed by an agreement that was forged during 1978–1979 negotiations, called the Mediated Role Determination (MRD). The MRD recommends the role of Paine Field to be as a general aviation and aerospace manufacturing airport, while discouraging other types of activities including supplemental/charter air passenger service. In 2005, Snohomish County commissioned a panel to review the MRD. That panel recommended that the MRD "should not be ratified or revised, but should be retired as a policy document". In June 2008, the Snohomish County Council rejected the findings of its panel, and as in 1989, 1992, and 2001, restated its opposition to commercial air passenger services operating from Paine Field with this resolution:

Reaffirm our county's commitment to preserving the existing general aviation role of Paine Field, and [to] pursue any and all lawful and appropriate means to discourage any action that would facilitate, directly or indirectly, use of Paine Field for scheduled air passenger service or air cargo service, which may include an interlocal agreement.

Further reflecting its opposition to commercial air service, Snohomish County has adopted a policy of not spending funds to subsidize airlines or to pay for the infrastructure needed to support commercial air service.

In 2008, two airlines, Allegiant Air and Horizon Air, expressed interest in establishing passenger flights to Paine Field to the airport authority. In May 2008, in response to these requests, the Chairman of the Snohomish County Council sent Allegiant Air a letter stating their opposition to the request to start air service. The FAA wrote to the airport authority in June 2008 to reiterate that as a recipient of federal FAA grants, the County may not prohibit commercial aeronautical activities offering services to the public. If the County blocked commercial flights, it would risk an enforcement action under Federal Aviation Regulation 16.

The airport completed a draft environmental assessment of the effects of commercial aviation at Paine Field in December 2009, and the public comment period ended on February 5, 2010. Opposition to Paine Field hosting commercial air service was overwhelming in meetings held for comments on the draft environmental assessment. The neighboring city of Mukilteo hired an aviation attorney to represent the interests of the city during the environmental assessment process and promised to "make it time consuming, expensive and stretch it out. We'll fight the terminal legally."

On December 4, 2012, the FAA concluded that commercial airplanes could fly out of Paine Field without significantly adding to local noise and traffic. The findings cleared the way for commercial operations along with the construction of a terminal building. On February 5, 2013, the cities of Edmonds and Mukilteo, along with two individuals, filed notice with the 9th U.S. Circuit Court of Appeals in San Francisco that they intend to challenge the results of the Environmental Assessment.

On July 15, 2013, Allegiant Air refused the county's terms to operate a terminal at Paine.

=== Commercial service resumes ===
In June 2014, New York-based Propeller Investments asked Snohomish County to start discussions leading to their construction of a terminal and parking facility at Paine Field. Propeller Investments would shoulder the risk — leasing land from the airport, financing terminal construction, and finding tenant airlines. On March 2, 2015, Snohomish County approved a lease-option agreement that gave Propeller Airports three years to carry out preliminary design work, environmental studies and to obtain permits needed to construct a proposed two-gate passenger terminal. In turn, Snohomish County would receive about $429,000 per year in rent plus a share of flight and parking revenues.

On March 4, 2016, a federal court denied an appeal by the City of Mukilteo and other citizens groups to prevent commercial flights at Paine Field.

The ground was broken for the passenger terminal on June 5, 2017. The 30,000 square foot building will have two gates and will be capable of handling about 16 flights per day. The operator, Propeller Airports, has agreed to limit early-morning and late-night commercial flights to reduce noise impacts on Mukilteo and nearby residential areas.

Alaska Airlines was the first to announce in May 2017 that it would operate from Paine Field. The airline initially announced that it would fly nine daily flights with a mix of mainline and regional jets. In January 2018, Alaska announced that instead all flights from Everett would be operated by its regional subsidiary, Horizon Air using the Embraer 175 regional jet, but that it would be offering 13 flights each day. In November 2018, the number of daily departures was again increased to 18. Alaska plans daily flights to several west coast destinations: Las Vegas, Los Angeles, Orange County, Phoenix, Portland, San Diego, San Francisco, and San Jose.

United Airlines announced on August 10, 2017, that six flights a day will be operated to its hubs in Denver and San Francisco.

Southwest Airlines announced on January 25, 2018, their intention to serve the airport with five daily flights, three to Oakland and two to Las Vegas. However, on November 15, 2018, Southwest reversed that decision and transferred its slots to Alaska Airlines.

Between Alaska and United, the initial commercial flight schedule for the airport included 24 daily departures, which was 50 percent higher than airport managers had initially planned for. In June 2018, the FAA announced an additional review of environmental impacts of passenger airline service, delaying the start of service between November 2018 and November 2019. The environmental review was completed in September 2018, and no significant additional environmental impacts were found, clearing the way for commercial service to start in early 2019.

Alaska previously announced that it planned to inaugurate service on February 11 with a ceremonial flight to Las Vegas, before ramping up to a full schedule of 18 departures on March 12, 2019. Alaska added that the gradual ramp-up would allow the airline and its employees to ensure operations at the new airport terminal were running smoothly. Alaska later announced in January 2019 that it was tentatively postponing the start of operations from February 11 to March 4, 2019, due to the 2018–19 United States federal government shutdown further delaying governmental approval to begin service. The first Alaska Airlines flight from Paine Field, carrying invited guests to Portland, departed at 10 a.m. on March 4, 2019; it was then followed by public flights to Las Vegas and Phoenix. United began service to Denver and San Francisco on March 31, 2019. The San Francisco flights ceased in March 2020, after the airline found insufficient demand.

Within a year of opening, the commercial terminal served more than one million passengers. Long-term plans for the terminal include free luggage carts, a cellphone lot, and a consolidated rental car center. The airport's operators have also stated their desire to see larger planes, including Boeing 737s, serve the terminal and routes to destinations like Hawaii. The commencement of commercial service brought new noise complaints from nearby residents, including 10 households who submitted 62 percent of the 3,656 complaints filed in December 2019.

San Juan Airlines announced plans in April 2019 to begin scheduled service from the separate Castle and Cooke Aviation building at Paine Field, in addition to its current charter offerings. Two daily flights to Friday Harbor Airport on San Juan Island began on May 1, using small Cessna airplanes.

The number of flights at Paine Field was reduced to a single daily round-trip operated by Alaska Airlines in May 2020 during the COVID-19 pandemic. The airport announced that it would close for 71 days to complete repairs to the gate ramps and other maintenance while traffic and demand were reduced. The terminal reopened on August 1 with three daily flights: Las Vegas and Phoenix on Alaska Airlines; and Denver on United Airlines.

In July 2021, United announced that they would be ending service to Paine Field in October of that year, opting instead to consolidate their resources at Sea-Tac. Alaska, left as the sole airline at the airport, had announced plans to add more service in response to demand. They deployed their mainline Boeing 737 service to Paine Field in February 2022 to supplement their existing E-175 service from regional operator Horizon Air. In June 2022, Alaska resumed their full pre-pandemic schedule of 18 daily departures to 9 destinations—all in the Western United States.

The county government renamed the airport to Seattle Paine Field International Airport on July 18, 2023. The new name is meant to advertise the airport's proximity to Seattle. The Washington Air National Guard plans to transfer 14 acres (5.7 ha) at Paine Field to the Snohomish County government for industrial use and to expand an existing access road. Frontier Airlines, a low-cost carrier, made their debut at Paine Field in June 2025 with flights to Denver, Las Vegas, and Phoenix on a thrice-weekly schedule. They reduced service to once-weekly in early December and left the market entirely on January 5, 2026.

== Passenger terminal ==
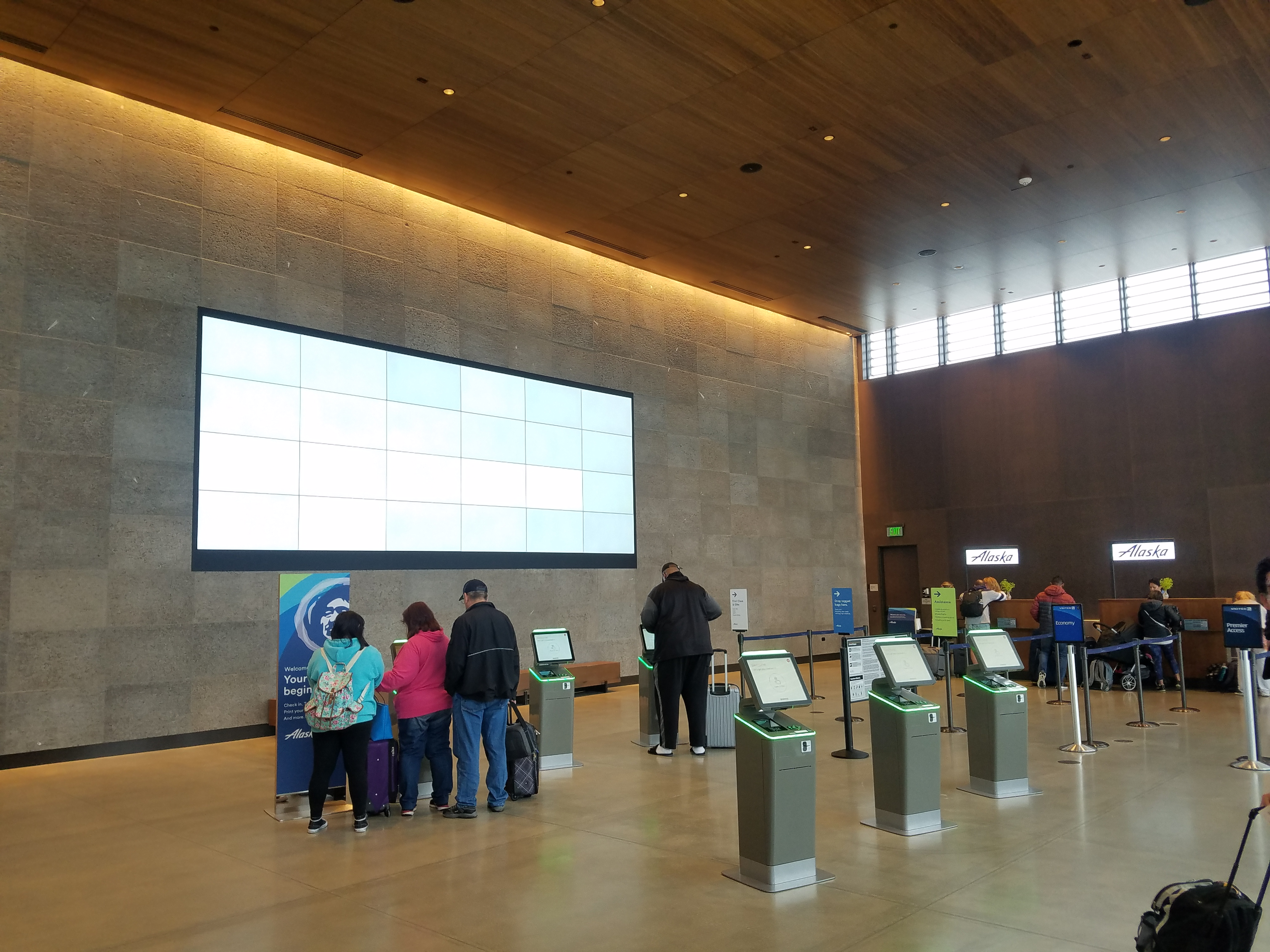
Interior of the passenger terminal in the check-in lobby

The new passenger terminal is located on the east side of the airport, near the intersection of Airport Road and 100th Street Southwest. Adjacent to the control tower, it has two gates and an additional hardstand space. The terminal includes a check-in area, a single TSA security checkpoint, a lobby with 300 seats, a coffee shop, a bar, and a food stand operated by Beecher's Handmade Cheese.

The lobby also has a curated display case with aviation memorabilia that represent the history of Paine Field, Alaska Airlines, and United Airlines; additional public artwork is installed in the parking lot and outside the building, including a statue of Topliff Olin Paine. The terminal also has valet parking, curbside drop-off areas, and a ride-hail/taxi stand.

The terminal was named the best regional airport in the world by Monocle magazine and one of the best small airports in the United States by USA Today.

== Airlines and destinations ==
At the time of its full launch in May 2019, Paine Field had 26 daily arrivals and departures on Alaska Airlines through their regional subsidiaries, as well as San Juan Airlines. The earliest departure was scheduled at 6 a.m. and the latest departure was 9:05 p.m. As of June 2022, Paine Field has 18 daily departures to 9 destinations. Most Alaska Airlines flights are operated by Horizon Air, though Alaska Airlines also operates a number of mainline Boeing 737 jets to supplement the regional carrier.

=== Passenger ===
Airlines	Destinations
Alaska Airlines	Las Vegas, Los Angeles, Orange County, Phoenix–Sky Harbor, Portland (OR), San Diego, San Francisco, San Jose (CA) (begins April 14, 2027); Seasonal: Palm Springs

Destinations from Paine Field
Red = Year-round destination
Green = Seasonal destination
Blue = Future destination

=== Cargo ===
There are no scheduled cargo flights to Paine Field as of December 2024. Starting in 2021, FedEx Express briefly operated a service to Memphis operating out of the Dreamlifter Operations Center previously used by Boeing after production of the Boeing 787 was moved to Boeing South Carolina. This service has since ended. The airport does see regular chartered cargo operations.

== Statistics ==
In 2024, a total of 580,000 passengers used Paine Field's terminal.

=== Airline market share ===
Largest Airlines at PAE (May 2025 – April 2026)
Rank	Airline	Passengers	Share
1	Alaska Airlines	306,000	48.37%
2	Horizon Air	290,000	45.86%
3	Frontier Airlines	36,400	5.76%
5	Kenmore Air	50	0.01%

=== Top destinations ===
Busiest domestic routes from PAE (May 2025 – April 2026)
Rank	Airport	Passengers	Carriers
1	Phoenix–Sky Harbor, Arizona	96,980	Alaska, Frontier
2	Las Vegas, Nevada	72,420	Alaska, Frontier
3	San Francisco, California	40,570	Alaska
4	Los Angeles, California	26,800	Alaska
5	San Diego, California	24,640	Alaska
6	Santa Ana, California	24,340	Alaska
7	Honolulu, Hawaii	15,750	Alaska
8	Palm Springs, California	10,920	Alaska
9	Denver, Colorado	7,530	Frontier

== Ground transportation ==
Paine Field's passenger terminal is located west of the intersection of Airport Road and 100th Street SW. Airport Road continues south towards State Route 99 and Interstate 5, the region's two primary north–south highways, and north towards State Route 526. State Route 526, a short freeway spur, connects the Paine Field area to Mukilteo and Everett via Interstate 5 and Evergreen Way.

=== Public transportation ===
The passenger terminal has two bus stops that are served by Community Transit and Everett Transit. A bus stop in the departures/arrivals area of the terminal is served by Everett Transit Route 8 with direct service to Everett Station and by Community Transit Route 907 with peak service to Everett, Marysville, Smokey Point and Stanwood. Community Transit operates another route along Airport Road, serving stops that are within walking distance of the terminal. The Swift Green Line, a bus rapid transit route, debuted in late March 2019 and connects Paine Field to Seaway Transit Center, south Everett, Mill Creek, and northern Bothell. It runs every 10 minutes midday on weekdays and 20 minutes at other times.

Sound Transit, the regional transit system, also plans to build a Link light rail extension to Everett in 2036, with a stop in the Paine Field area.

== Accidents and incidents ==
- On July 29, 1962, a USAF North American Sabreliner on an orientation flight lost hydraulics and overshot the runway on landing, subsequently going through a barrier and hitting an embankment. Both occupants were killed.
- On October 8, 1996, a Cessna 210 Centurion crashed just north of the airport while attempting to land in heavy fog, killing the pilot. The plane struck a utility pole and several trees before coming to a stop 100 yards (91 m) short of the runway, narrowly missing State Route 526 in the process.
- On June 10, 2015, a Beechcraft Bonanza crashed immediately after takeoff, going down in a wooded area south of the airport between the main runway and Mukilteo Speedway. Of the two occupants on the plane, one died at the scene while the other survived with bone fractures.
- On May 2, 2017, a Piper PA-32-260 crashed immediately after takeoff south of the airport, striking a power line and several cars at the intersection of Harbour Pointe Boulevard and Mukilteo Speedway; the pilot reported losing power beforehand. Both the pilot and the sole passenger survived the crash uninjured; two people on the ground reported minor injuries.
- On February 16, 2024, a Cessna 152 impacted trees and crashed in Japanese Gulch, Mukilteo, near the north end of the field because of engine issues. The sole occupant, the pilot, was not injured.

== See also ==
- List of airports in Washington
- Hamburg Finkenwerder Airport, the airport attached to the Airbus assembly facility
