= Orcas Island Airport =

- IATA: ESD; ICAO: KORS; FAA LID: ORS

Summary
- Airport type: Public
- Owner: Port of Orcas
- Location: Eastsound, Washington
- Elevation AMSL: 31 ft (9.4 m)
- Coordinates: 48°42′29″N 122°54′38″W

Map
- Location of airport in Washington ESD (the United States)

Runways
Direction	Length		Surface
Direction	ft	m	Surface
16/34	2,900	884	Asphalt

Statistics
- Aircraft operations (2014): 41,800
- Based aircraft (2017): 74
- Source: Federal Aviation Administration

Orcas Island Airport (IATA: ESD, ICAO: KORS, FAA LID: ORS) is a public airport located 1 nautical mile (1.9 km; 1.2 mi) north of the central business district of Eastsound on Orcas Island in San Juan County, Washington, United States.

Many U.S. airports use the same three-letter location identifier for the FAA and IATA. However, this airport is assigned ORS by the FAA but has been assigned ESD from the IATA. ORS has been assigned to Orpheus Island Resort Waterport in Queensland, Australia.

It is included in the Federal Aviation Administration (FAA) National Plan of Integrated Airport Systems for 2017–2021, in which it is categorized as a non-primary commercial service facility.

== History ==
In February 2018, NorthStar Air Tours launched a flight from Orcas Island to Victoria International Airport with stopover service at Friday Harbor. The 20-mile (32 km) flight was the shortest international flight in North America at the time.

== Facilities and aircraft ==
Orcas Island Airport covers an area of 64 acres (26 ha) which contains one asphalt paved runway (16/34) measuring 2,900 x 60 ft (884 x 18 m).

In 2014, the airport had 41,800 aircraft operations, an average of 114 per day: 79% general aviation, 16% commercial, and 5% air taxi. In July 2017, there were 74 aircraft based at this airport: 70 single engine and 4 multi-engine.

== Airlines and destinations ==
Airlines	Destinations
Kenmore Air	Seattle–Boeing; Charter: Vancouver
San Juan Airlines	Anacortes, Bellingham, Blakley Island, Friday Harbor, Roche Harbor

Destinations Map
Destinations from Friday Harbor Airport
Red = Year-round destination
Yellow = Charter destination

== See also ==
- List of airports in Washington
