= Topliff =

Topliff may refer to:

== People ==
=== Given name ===
- Topliff Olin Paine (1893-1922), American airmail and Army Air Corps pilot

=== Surname ===
- Alfred Topliff (1799-1879), American teacher, surveyor, and politician
- E. Curtis Topliff (1829/30–1895), American businessman and politician
- Susan Topliff Davis (1862-1931), American civic and religious leader

== Other ==
- Nathaniel Topliff Allen Homestead, historic house in West Newton, in Newton, Massachusetts, U.S.
