= Point Roberts Airpark =

Airport in Point Roberts, Washington

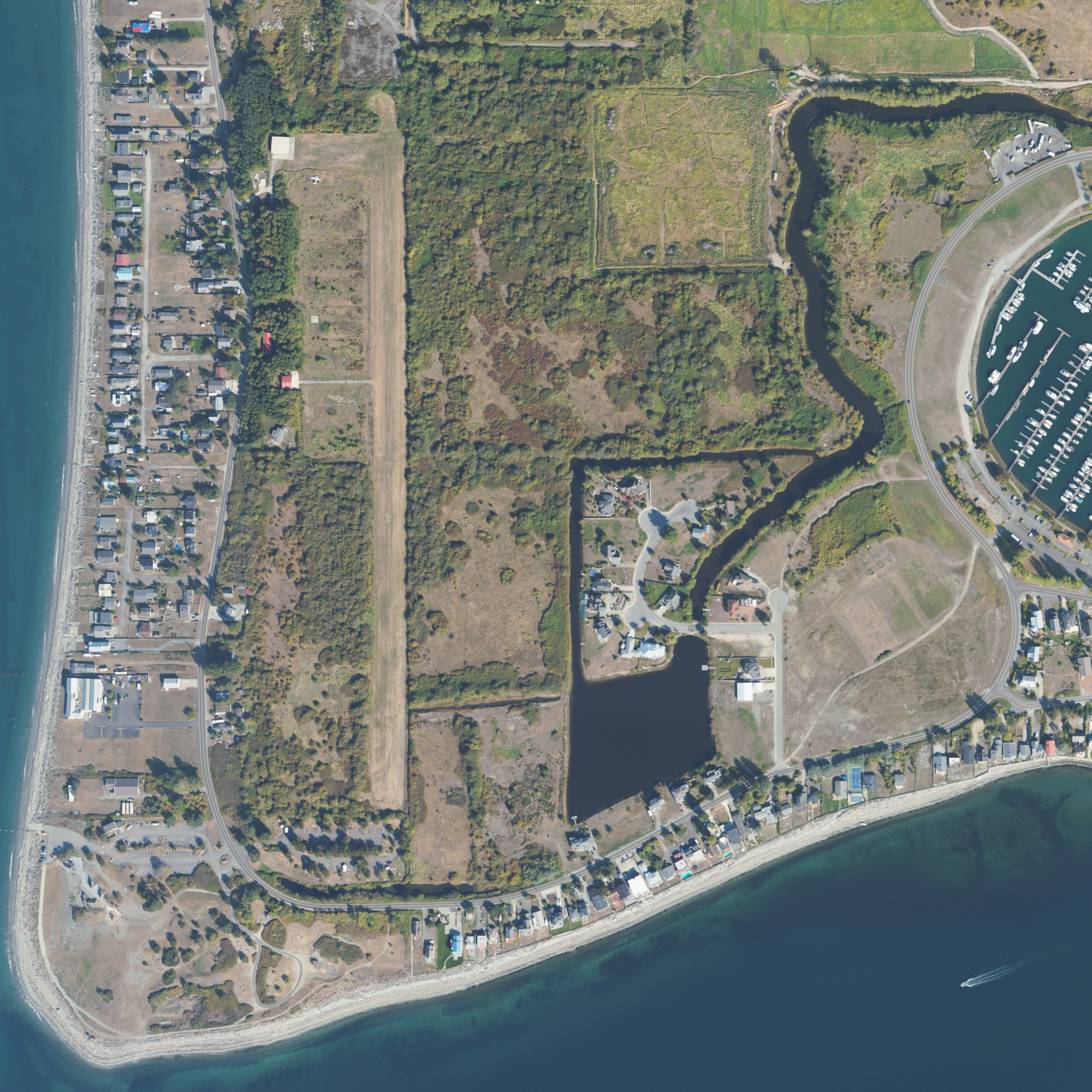
- Airpark and surrounding area in September 2023
- IATA: none; ICAO: 1RL; FAA LID: 1RL

Summary
- Airport type: Public
- Owner/Operator: Lily Point Holdings
- Serves: Point Roberts, Washington
- Elevation AMSL: 10 ft (3.0 m)
- Coordinates: 48°58′47.0″N 123°04′44.0″W

Runways
Direction	Length		Surface
Direction	ft	m	Surface
16/34	2,265	690	Turf

Statistics (2021)
- Aircraft operations: 1630

Point Roberts Airpark (ICAO: 1RL, FAA LID: 1RL) is an airport with a single grass runway, located in the town of Point Roberts, Washington. The airport and the adjacent marina provide the only access to the rest of Washington state without first having to pass through British Columbia.

In 2000, a new five-plane hangar was built. It also features several couches and serves as a makeshift waiting room.

== History ==
Point Roberts Airpark was created by Ray Young. He was a cartoonist at Buena Vista Studios who had a lifelong interest in flying. Ray moved to the Pacific Northwest in 1967 and purchased land in Point Roberts, developing it into an air strip he called Ray Young Field. He moved to Point Roberts with his wife, Uvon, in 1972. Later, he bought more land and extended the runway to its current length. Ray died in 1985; wife Uvon closed the runway and put the land up for sale in 1990. In 1996, she sold it to Robin Lamb, a retired Air Canada captain with 22,000-plus hours total flight time.

In the 1996–1998 period, using a 1955 Galion grader and a 1956 International TD-91 bulldozer, the airstrip was made usable again. The bulldozer cleared the trees, the grader put a 3-foot (0.91 m) crown on the runway and cleared the 8 acres (32,000 m^{2}) of the parking/air park area.

In November 1998, the runway was seeded with a low-maintenance turf. In the intervening years, except for mowing, the runway has needed no further maintenance and is used year-round.

Lamb died in 2012 and his surviving family members appointed Romi Singh, a local pilot and airport consultant to become the facility manager. The current manager is Bob Granley. Plans for the future include hangar homes and more hangar space. A GPS approach and customs clearance are being worked on.

== Airlines and destinations ==
Airlines	Destinations
San Juan Airlines	Bellingham

== See also ==
- List of airports in Washington
