= San Juan Airlines =

Airline of the United States

IATA	ICAO	Call sign
—	SJN	SAN JUAN
- Founded: 1947; 79 years ago; 2002; 24 years ago (operations resumed)
- AOC #: R01A597J
- Hubs: Bellingham Airport
- Headquarters: Bellingham, Washington
- Website: sanjuanairlines.com

San Juan Airlines is a commuter airline operating scheduled and charter flights in the U.S. state of Washington and the Canadian province of British Columbia. Its main base of operations is Bellingham near the San Juan Islands. The airline's fleet consists of Cessna 172, 206 and 207 aircraft. In 1981, San Juan Airlines acquired Pearson Aircraft which was based in Port Angeles, Washington.

On May 21, 2014, Northwest Sky Ferry, which operated since 2007, merged into San Juan Airlines. In May 2019, San Juan Airlines became the third airline to begin weekly passenger service at the Paine Field airport in Snohomish County, WA.

== Destinations ==
- Washington, United States
  - Anacortes – Anacortes Airport
  - Bellingham – Bellingham International Airport
  - Friday Harbor (San Juan Island) – Friday Harbor Airport
  - Lopez Island – Lopez Island Airport
  - Orcas Island – Orcas Island Airport
  - Decatur Island – Decatur Shores Airport
  - Center Island – Center Island Airport
  - Waldron Island – Waldronaire Airport
  - Stuart Island – Stuart Island Airport West/East
  - Point Roberts – Point Roberts Airpark
  - Port Angeles – William R. Fairchild International Airport
  - Port Townsend – Jefferson County International Airport
  - Everett – Paine Field
  - Arlington – Arlington Airport
  - Renton – Renton Airport
  - Seattle – Boeing Field
  - Olympia – Olympia Airport
  - Tacoma – Tacoma Narrows Airport
- Oregon, United States
  - Portland – Portland International Airport
- British Columbia, Canada
  - Campbell River – Campbell River Airport
  - Nanaimo – Nanaimo Airport
  - Port Hardy – Port Hardy Airport
  - Tofino – Tofino Airport
  - Vancouver – Vancouver International Airport
  - Victoria – Victoria International Airport

== Fleet ==
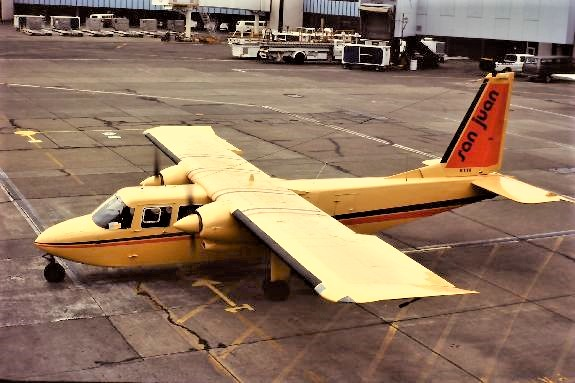
Britten-Norman BN-2A previously operated

- 2 – Cessna 172 Skyhawk
- 3 – Cessna 207 Skywagon
- 1 – Cessna 206 Stationair

San Juan Airlines has previously used Cessna Caravan, Beechcraft 99 and Embraer EMB-110 Bandeirante turboprops as well as Britten-Norman Islander and Cessna 402 prop aircraft.
