= Roche Harbor Airport =

- IATA: none; ICAO: none; FAA LID: WA09

Summary
- Airport type: Private
- Owner: Roche Harbor Airport Inc.
- Serves: Roche Harbor, Washington
- Elevation AMSL: 100 ft / 30 m
- Coordinates: 48°36′44″N 123°08′19″W

Map
- Location of airport in Washington WA09 (the United States)

Runways
Direction	Length		Surface
Direction	ft	m	Surface
7/25	3,593	1,095	Asphalt
- Source: Federal Aviation Administration

Roche Harbor Airport (FAA LID: WA09) is a private airport located one nautical mile (2 km) northeast of the central business district of Roche Harbor, in San Juan County, Washington, United States. It was formerly a public use airport (FAA ID: 9S1). The 9S1 location identifier has been reassigned to Four Winds Airport in Celina, Texas.

== Facilities ==
Roche Harbor Airport resides at elevation of 100 feet (30 m) above mean sea level. It has one runway designated 7/25 with an asphalt surface measuring 3,593 by 30 feet (1,095 x 9 m).

== Airline and destinations ==
Airlines	Destinations
San Juan Airlines	Anacortes, Bellingham, Friday Harbor

== See also ==
- List of airports in Washington
- Roche Harbor Seaplane Base
