= OR Group =

Russian footwear company

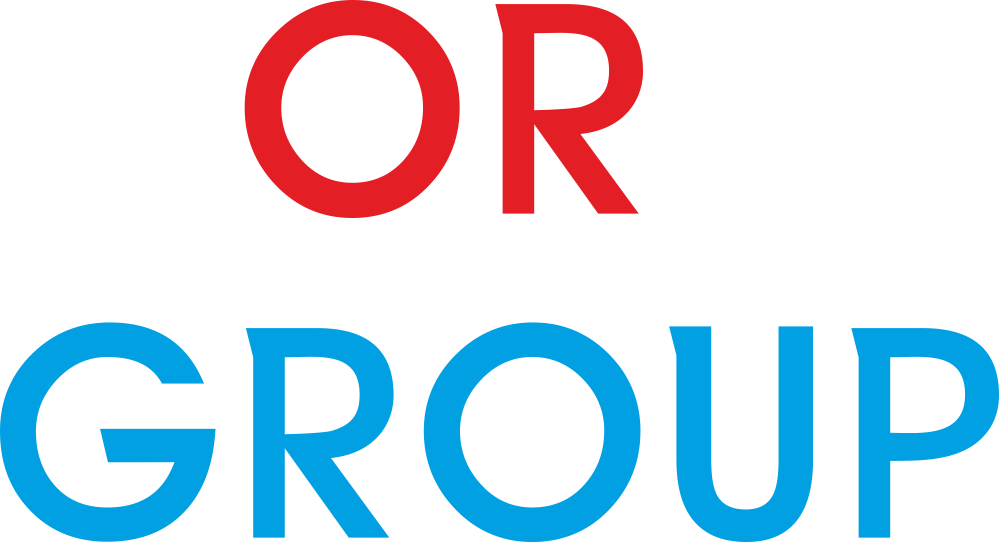
- Native name: Обувь России
- Company type: Public company
- Industry: Retail
- Founded: 2003
- Founder: Anton Titov
- Defunct: 28 July 2025
- Headquarters: Novosibirsk, Russia
- Area served: Russia
- Key people: Anton Titov
- Products: Shoes
- Website: obuvrus.ru

OR Group (Russian: Obuv Rossii lit. 'Shoes Russia Group') was a Russian shoe company founded in Novosibirsk in 2003 by Anton Titov. The company manufactured shoes at its two factories and sold them under a number of brands including Westfalika, Peshekhod, Rossita, Emilia Estra and Lisette at stores across Russia. The company became bankrupt in 2025.

== History ==
The company was founded in 2003 in Novosibirsk.

In March 2007, a project was launched in several Novosibirsk stores of the company: customers could take an interest-free loan for 3–5 months to buy shoes, but the purchase had to be more than 3000 rubles, and as a result, sales in the shops grew by 15% in three months.

In 2010, the firm has signed a one-year advertising contract with singer Valeriya.

In 2015, Obuv Rossii bought the S-TEP, a Novosibirsk shoe company, which owned a shoe factory in Berdsk.

In November 2020, the company decided to change the name Obuv Rossii to OR Group; it also decided to go beyond the fashion segment and become a universal retailer developing a trading platform and online marketplace under the brand name Prodayom.

In July 2025, the company was declared bankrupt by the Moscow Arbitration Court.

== Factories ==
The company owned two shoe factories in Novosibirsk and Berdsk.

== Brands ==
The company's stores operate under the brands Westfalika, Peshekhod, Rossita, Emilia Estra and Lisette. The OR Group also develops footwear and clothing brands for an active lifestyle: S-TEP, all.go and Snow Guard. The number of stores is 851, 175 of which are franchised.

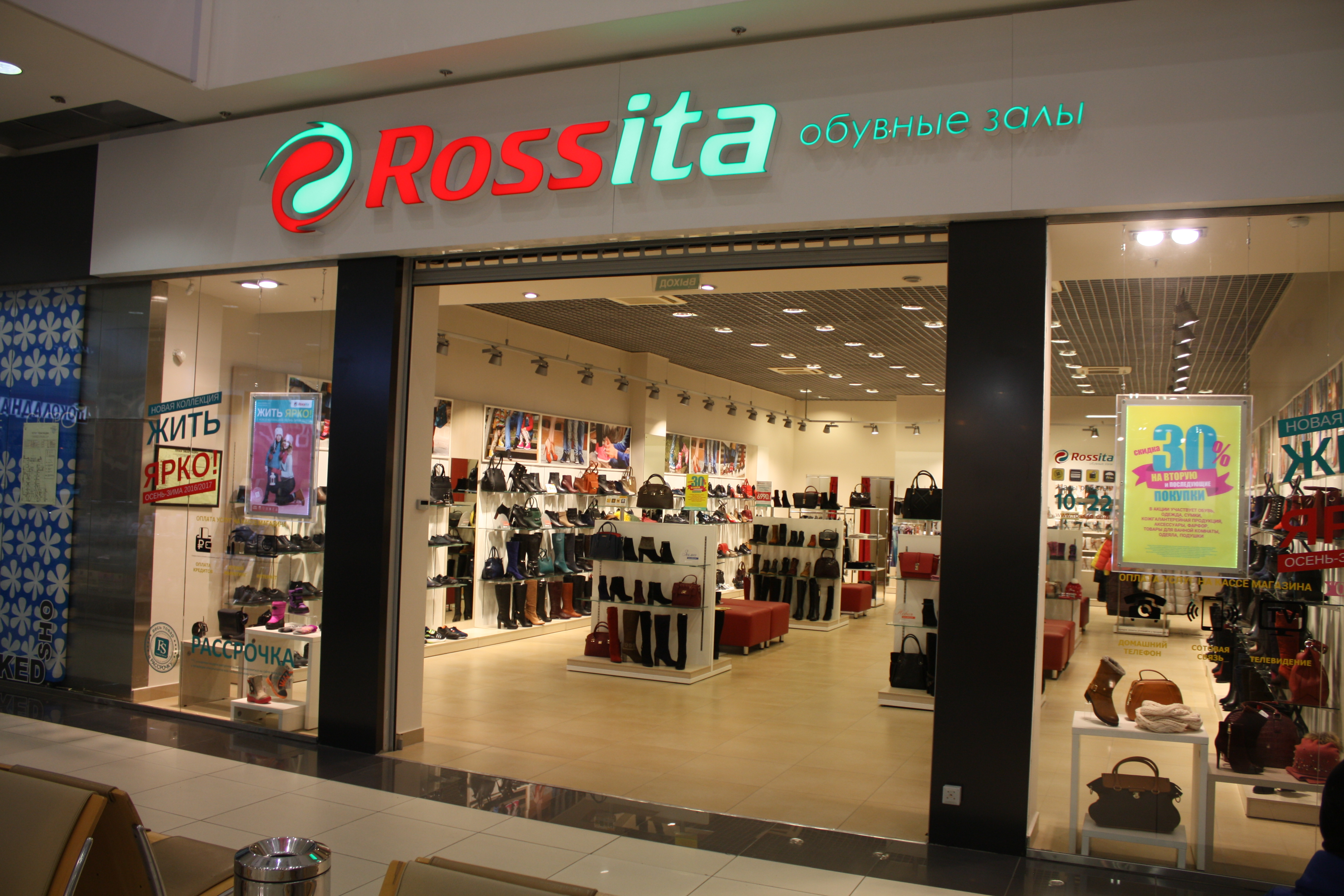
Rossita

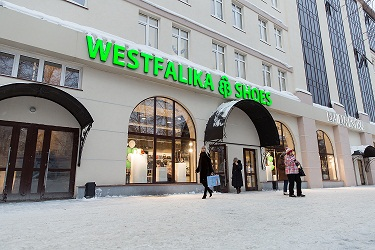
Westfalika

== See also ==
- KORS
