= Kors =

Kors is a surname. Notable people with the surname include:

- Alan Charles Kors (born 1943), American intellectual historian
- Ida Kors (born 1982), Swedish politician
- Michael Kors (born 1959), American fashion designer

== See also ==
- Kors Church
- KORS (disambiguation)
