= Western Airlines (2007) =

Airline in the United States

IATA	ICAO	Call sign
XP	CXP	RUBY MOUNTAIN
- Founded: 2006; 20 years ago
- Commenced operations: January 18, 2007; 19 years ago
- Ceased operations: February 7, 2007; 19 years ago
- Hubs: Bellingham International Airport
- Fleet size: 1 (at time of demise)
- Destinations: 4 (at time of demise)
- Headquarters: Bellingham, Washington
- Key people: Jerry Welch (President); Curt Tronsdal (Chairman)
- Website: www.iflywestern.com (defunct)

Western Airlines was an American low-cost airline headquartered in Bellingham, Washington, and operated from a hub at Bellingham International Airport.

== History ==
Officials of the Port of Bellingham had set the goal in 2004 of obtaining additional passenger service for Bellingham International Airport to destinations other than Seattle. In late 2005, the Port announced that it had entered into a lease with Western, a startup airline founded by two local businessmen with aviation experience.

On November 16, 2006, Western announced that they would begin flights in January from Bellingham International Airport to four vacation destinations; the fourth announced destination of Reno, Nevada was cancelled before the airline began service. Service began on January 18, 2007, with a flight from Bellingham to Ontario, California. Western operated as a "scheduled charter" service, with aircraft wet leased from Xtra Airways and was working through the process of gaining FAA approval as a commercial airline.

On February 7, 2007, Western suspended operations due to outstanding debts to suppliers, including Xtra Airways and the fuel vendor in Bellingham. Xtra Airways continued service in order to return Western's passengers to their originating airport. Xtra Airways officials stated that flights have had to stop in Seattle, Washington to take on fuel, though a Western spokesperson claimed that only one flight has had to stop, and that was due to a higher than expected fuel burn on the flight to Bellingham.

Western officials traced the problem to difficulties with credit card payments. The company had been running into problems obtaining a merchant identification number, which was needed before banks would deposit money into the airline's account. The airline stated it was working out an arrangement with PayPal, which would allow credit card payments to be processed and sent to the airline without the need for a merchant identification number. The airline expected to resume flights once the problem was resolved.

== Destinations ==
Western flew to four destinations in the United States:

=== United States ===
==== Arizona ====
- Mesa/Phoenix (Phoenix-Mesa Gateway Airport)

==== California ====
- Ontario (LA/Ontario International Airport)
- San Diego (San Diego International Airport)

==== Washington ====
- Bellingham (Bellingham International Airport) Hub

== Fleet ==
At the time of Western's demise on February 7, 2007, the airline had 1 aircraft in its fleet consisting of:

Type	Total	Passenger Capacity	Routes	Notes
Boeing 737-400	1	150	Medium Haul	wet lease from Xtra Airways

== See also ==
- List of defunct airlines of the United States
