= Friday Harbor Airport =

Airport in Friday Harbor, Washington, United States

Coordinates: 48°31′19″N 123°01′28″W

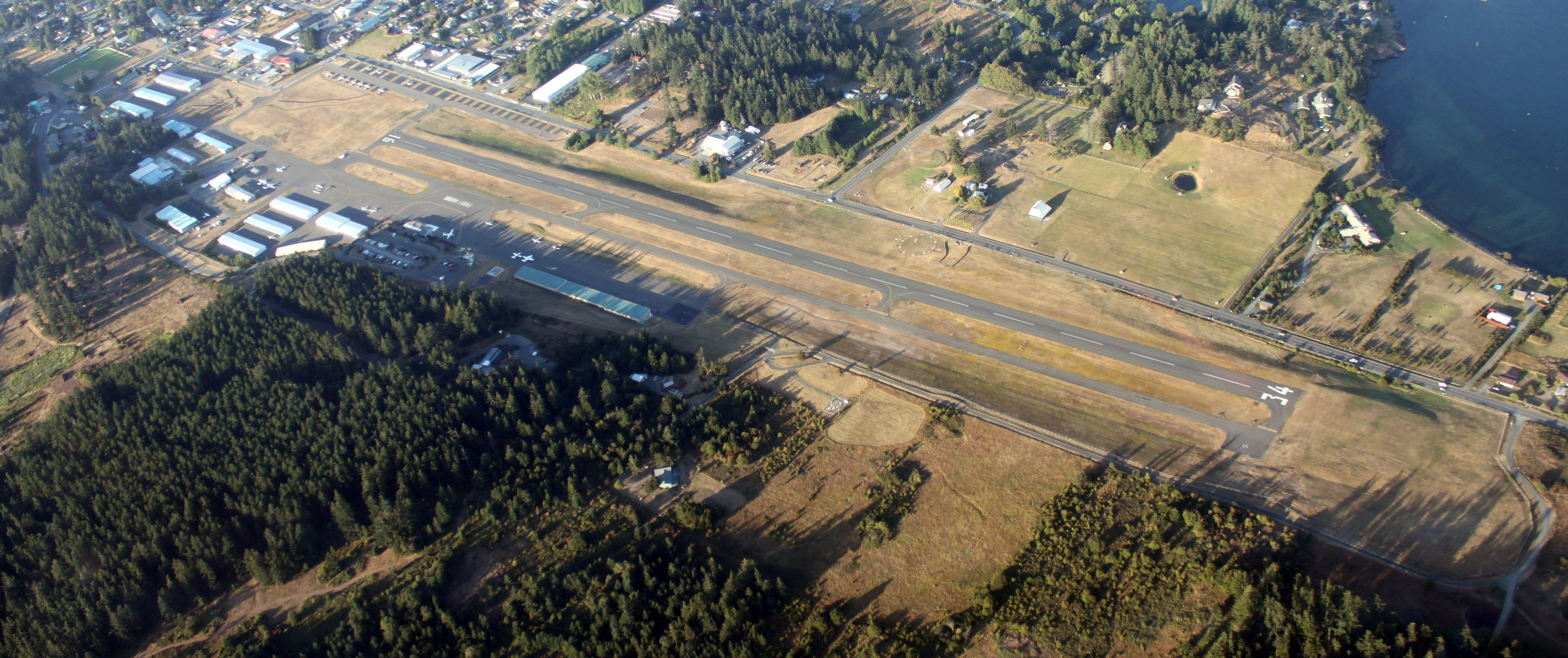
- IATA: FRD; ICAO: KFHR; FAA LID: FHR

Summary
- Airport type: Public
- Owner: Port of Friday Harbor
- Serves: Friday Harbor, Washington
- Elevation AMSL: 113 ft (34 m)
- Website: www.portfridayharbor.org/airport}

Map
- Location of airport in Washington FRD/KFHR/FHR (the United States)

Runways
Direction	Length		Surface
Direction	ft	m	Surface
16/34	3,402	1,037	Asphalt

Statistics
- Passenger volume (12 months ending February 2020): 23,000
- Scheduled flights: 2,801
- Aircraft operations (2016): 44,840
- Based aircraft (2020): 151
- Source: Federal Aviation Administration, BTS

Friday Harbor Airport (IATA: FRD, ICAO: KFHR, FAA LID: FHR) is a public use airport located just southwest of the town center of Friday Harbor on San Juan Island in the U.S. state of Washington. It is owned by the Port of Friday Harbor.

Although most U.S. airports use the same three-letter location identifier for the FAA and IATA, Friday Harbor Airport is assigned FHR by the FAA and FRD by the IATA.

It is included in the Federal Aviation Administration (FAA) National Plan of Integrated Airport Systems for 2019–2023, in which it is categorized as a non-hub primary commercial service facility.

== Facilities and aircraft ==
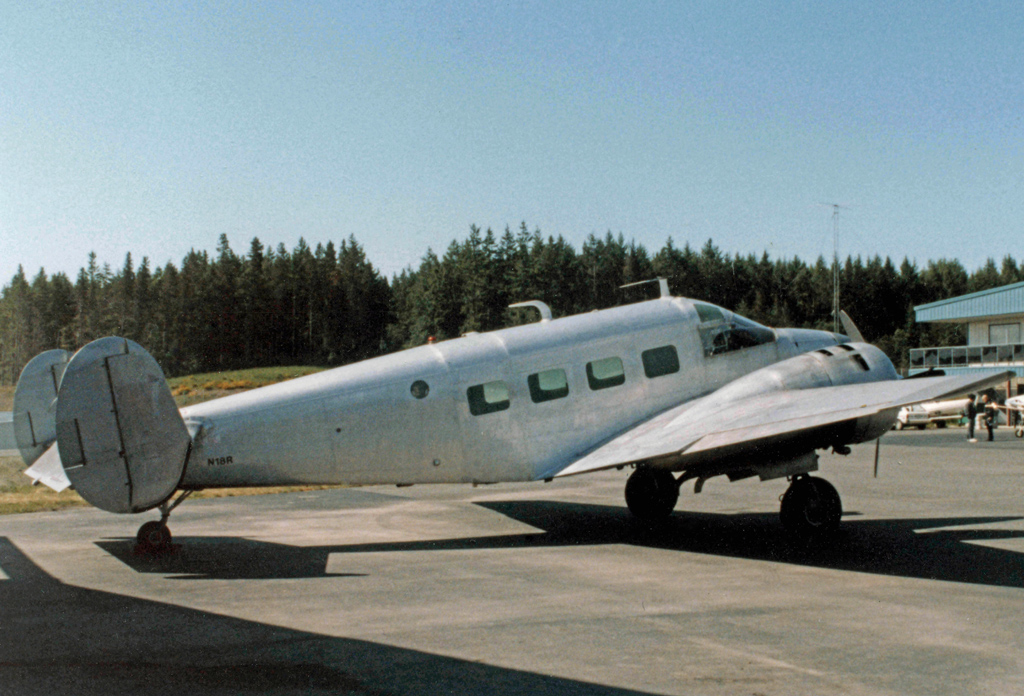
Beechcraft Model 18 carrying freight to Friday Harbor from the Washington mainland

Friday Harbor Airport covers an area of 145 acres (59 ha) which contains one runway (16/34) with a 3,402 x 75 ft (1,037 x 23 m) asphalt pavement.

In 2016, the airport had 44,840 aircraft operations, an average of 123 per day: 72% general aviation and 29% air taxi. In May 2020, there were 151 aircraft based at this airport: 138 single-engine, 7 multi-engine, and 6 helicopter.

== Airlines and destinations ==
=== Passenger ===
Airlines	Destinations
Kenmore Air	Eastsound, Seattle–Boeing, Victoria
San Juan Airlines	Anacortes, Bellingham, Lopez Island, Roche Harbor

Destinations Map
Destinations from Friday Harbor Airport

=== Cargo ===
Airlines	Destinations
FedEx Feeder	Seattle/Tacoma

== Statistics ==
=== Carrier shares ===
Carrier shares (March 2019 – February 2020)
Carrier	Passengers (arriving and departing)
Kenmore Air	19,370(85.2%)
San Juan Airlines	3,370(14.8%)

=== Top destinations ===
Busiest domestic routes from ATW (March 2019 – February 2020)
Rank	Airport	Passengers	Carriers
1	Seattle–Boeing, Washington	6,580	Kenmore
2	Eastsound, Washington	3,280	Kenmore, San Juan
3	Renton, Washington	1,650	—N/a

== In popular culture ==
Friday Harbor is the default starting location in the flight simulator Microsoft Flight Simulator X.

== See also ==
- List of airports in Washington
