= KORS (shoe factory) =

Russian shoe factory in Novosibirsk, founded in 1934

- Founded: 1934
- Headquarters: Novosibirsk, Russia
- Products: Shoes
- Website: www.kors34.ru

KORS (also Novosibirsk Shoe Factory, Leather and Shoe Factory named after Kirov) is a shoe factory in Novosibirsk, Russia. It was founded in 1934.

== History ==
The shoe factory was founded in 1934 in Novosibirsk. In 1935 it occupied the building of the former Military Rusk Plant.

During the Great Patriotic War, the factory produced about 7 million pairs of boots for sailors and soldiers; during this period, the enterprise also manufactured ski bindings, mine casings, etc.

In 1969 the shoe factory produced over 6 million pairs of shoes (187 models).

In 1970–1980 the factory maintained economic ties with India, China, Vietnam, Italy and Yugoslavia.

In 1972 and 1984 the plants of hard and chrome leather were reconstructed.

In 1988, injection molding machines were put into operation, thanks to which an additional 750 thousand pairs of shoes were manufactured.

In the 1990s, the factory was re-equipped. Computer technology appeared at the enterprise.

== Finance ==
=== 2020 ===
- Revenue – 126 651 000 rubles;
- Profit – 5 385 000 rubles.

== Culture ==
In 1935, the House of Culture named after Kirov was created at the factory. In 1937, the Museum of Labor and Military Glory was founded.

Even before the Great Patriotic War, the Kirovsky Udarnik newspaper began to be published. In 1956, the Tribuna newspaper appears. Since 1995, the factory begins to publish a newsletter.

== Directors ==
- A. M. Zinikovsky (1932–1936);
- N. A. Volkovitsky (1936–1937);
- Kh. N. Girshenblyush (1937–1941);
- A. A. Kluss (1941–1945);
- V. S. Zelmanov (1945–1947);
- D. D. Rodygin (1947–1957);
- V. G. Chuchkalov (1957–1968);
- V. I. Kramorenko (1968–1972);
- A. A. Kovalyov (1972–1974);
- S. M. Zverev (1974–1985);
- V. P. Shcherbakova (?–?);
- S. B. Kizner.

== See also ==
- OR Group
