= Lopez Island Airport =

- IATA: none; ICAO: none; FAA LID: S31

Summary
- Airport type: Public
- Owner: Port of Lopez
- Location: Lopez Island, Washington
- Elevation AMSL: 209 ft / 64 m
- Coordinates: 48°29′02″N 122°56′16″W

Map

Runways
Direction	Length		Surface
Direction	ft	m	Surface
16/34	2,905	885	Asphalt

Statistics (2021)
- Aircraft operations: 10,004
- Based aircraft: 26
- Source: Federal Aviation Administration

Lopez Island Airport (FAA LID: S31) is a public use airport located three nautical miles (6 km) south of the central business district of Lopez, a village on Lopez Island in San Juan County, Washington, United States. It is owned by the Port of Lopez.

== Facilities and aircraft ==
Lopez Island Airport covers an area of 93 acres (38 ha) at an elevation of 209 feet (64 m) above mean sea level. It has one runway designated 16/34 with an asphalt surface measuring 2,905 by 61 feet (885 x 19 m).

For the 12-month period ending December 31, 2021, the airport had 10,004 aircraft operations, an average of 27 per day: 75% general aviation, 25% air taxi, and <1% military. At that time there were 26 aircraft based at this airport: 25 single-engine, and 1 multi-engine.

== Airlines and destinations ==
Airlines	Destinations
San Juan Airlines	Blakely Island, Bellingham, Friday Harbor

== See also ==
- Fishermans Bay/LPS Seaplane Base
- List of airports in Washington
