= Victoria International Airport =

Airport in British Columbia, Canada

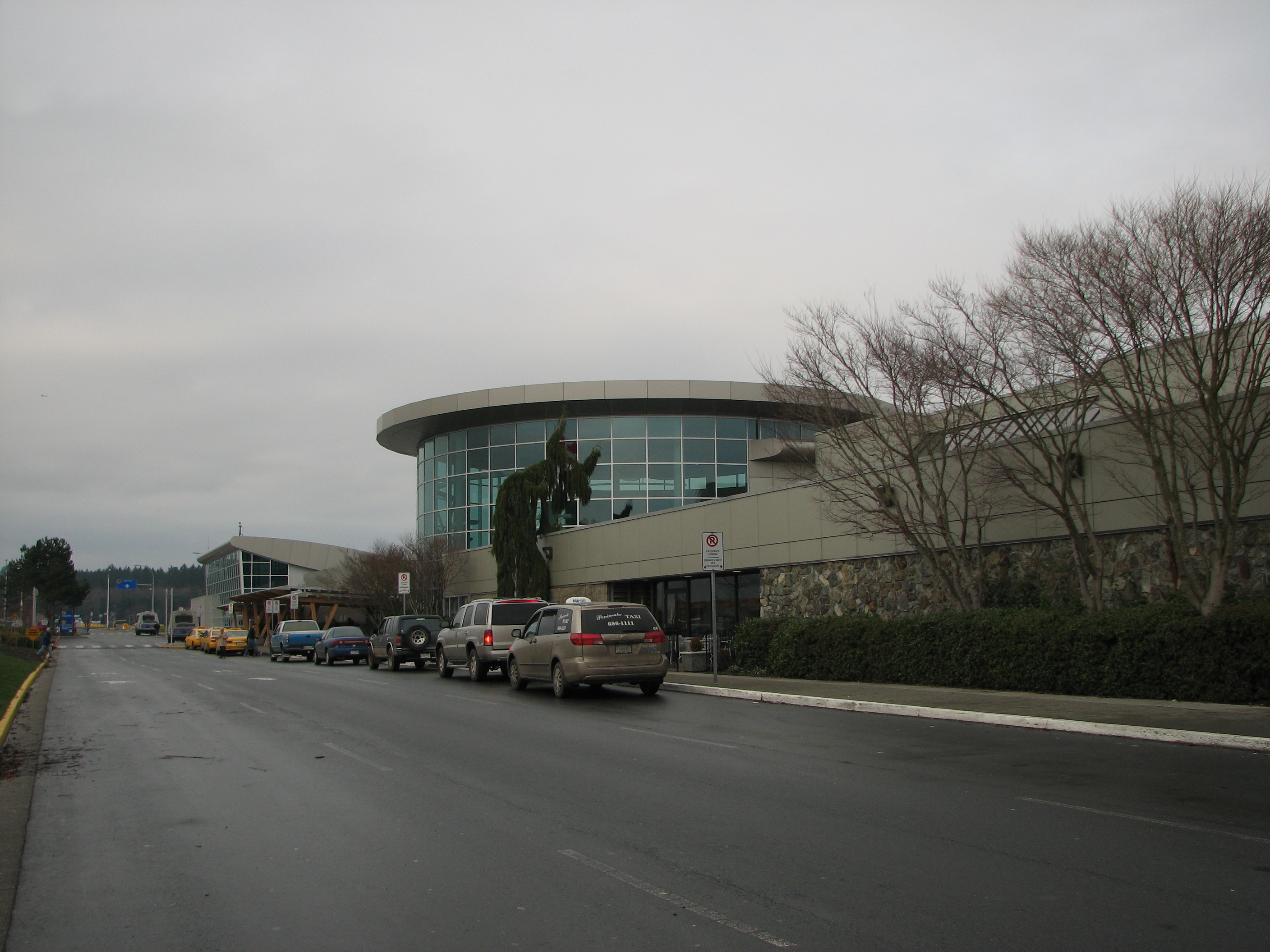
- IATA: YYJ; ICAO: CYYJ; WMO: 71799

Summary
- Airport type: Public
- Owner: Transport Canada
- Operator: Victoria International Airport Authority
- Serves: Victoria, British Columbia
- Location: North Saanich, British Columbia
- Time zone: MST (UTC−07:00)
- Elevation AMSL: 64 ft (20 m)
- Coordinates: 48°38′50″N 123°25′33″W
- Public transit access: Victoria Regional Transit 87 88
- Website: yyj.ca

Map
- Location in British Columbia CYYJ (Canada)

Runways
Direction	Length		Surface
Direction	ft	m	Surface
09/27	6,998	2,133	Grooved asphalt
03/21	5,027	1,532	Asphalt
14/32	5,001	1,524	Grooved asphalt

Statistics (2025)
- Aircraft movements: 107,785
- Number of passengers: 1,986,057
- Sources: Canada Flight Supplement; Environment Canada; Victoria Airport Authority Facts & Stats

Victoria International Airport (IATA: YYJ, ICAO: CYYJ) serves Victoria, British Columbia, Canada. It is 12 nautical miles (22 km; 14 mi) north northwest of Victoria on the Saanich Peninsula, with the bulk of the airport (including the passenger terminal) in North Saanich, and a small portion of the airfield extending into Sidney. The airport is run by the Victoria Airport Authority. YYJ has many non-stop daily flights to Vancouver International Airport (YVR, about 15 minutes), which is a major airport serving many global routes. Additionally, Victoria International has non-stop international service to Seattle (SEA), and domestic service to Ottawa (YOW), Toronto (YYZ), Montreal (YUL, summer only), Calgary (YYC), Edmonton (YEG), and Winnipeg (YWG) alongside several smaller cities in British Columbia and Yukon. The airport also has seasonal (late fall to early spring) non-stop service to several Mexican resort destinations. Non-stop service between Victoria and the United States decreased by 50% at the beginning of September 2019 when Delta Air Lines permanently ended its three daily flights to Seattle, after which only Alaska Airlines continued to fly the route.

Victoria International Airport is classified as an airport of entry by Nav Canada and is staffed by the Canada Border Services Agency (CBSA). CBSA officers at this airport can handle aircraft with no more than 450 passengers, when unloaded from the aircraft in stages, or 120 normally. YYJ does not have United States customs and border preclearance, but many passengers fly first to Vancouver International Airport (YVR), which does have U.S. preclearance.

In 2025, YYJ served 1,986,057 passengers and had 107,785 aircraft movements, making it Canada's 10th busiest airport in terms of passengers. It was British Columbia's third busiest airport in terms of passengers and aircraft movements. The airport is also home to Arundel Castle, the operating base for 443 Maritime Helicopter Squadron of the Royal Canadian Air Force.

Like most airports that are run by local authorities in Canada, YYJ charges an airport improvement fee for each outgoing passenger. As of April 2024, it was $25.00 per departing passenger. AIF fees are usually added to fares and collected automatically by most airlines.

== History ==
The airport started in 1939 as a grass strip, and was used as a military training airfield. During the early part of World War II (1940–1941), the airfield was used as Royal Air Force Station Patricia Bay, providing basic flight training for Royal Air Force pilots preparatory to returning them to the UK.

In approximately 1942 the aerodrome became a Royal Canadian Air Force (RCAF) installation listed as RCAF Aerodrome - Patricia Bay, British Columbia at 48°39′N 123°26′W with a variation of 24 degrees east and elevation of 25 ft (7.6 m). The aerodrome was listed with three runways as follows:

Runway name	Length	Width	Surface
13/31	5,000 ft (1,500 m)	200 ft (61 m)	Hard surfaced
8/26	5,000 ft (1,500 m)	200 ft (61 m)	Hard surfaced
2/20	5,000 ft (1,500 m)	200 ft (61 m)	Hard surfaced

The airport is located beside Patricia Bay, which, due to the prevalence of flying boats at the time, proved to be an excellent location. The Department of Transport took over the airport in 1948. It was then called Victoria (Patricia Bay) Airport, and many locals still refer to it as the "Pat Bay Airport". Trans-Canada Airlines (later Air Canada) began regular service in 1943.

In 1959, the airport was renamed the "Victoria International Airport".

The last RCAF unit left the airport in 1952. In July 1989, Canadian Forces Air Command (Note: In 1968, the Royal Canadian Air Force, Royal Canadian Navy, and Canadian Army were consolidated into the unified Canadian Armed Forces (CAF) as Air Command, Maritime Command, and Land Forces respectively. In 2011, the pre-1968 service names were restored, although the unified command structure of the CAF did not change.) returned to Victoria International Airport when HS 443 Squadron, which operated CH-124 Sea King ship-borne anti-submarine warfare (ASW) helicopters, was relocated from CFB Shearwater to better support Canadian Forces Maritime Command operations in the Pacific. In 1995, the squadron was redesignated as 443 Maritime Helicopter Squadron.

In 1997, as part of a broad scale restructuring of airports across Canada, Transport Canada (formerly the Department of Transport), gave operational control of the airport to the Victoria Airport Authority.

In 2000, the Victoria Airport Authority began the process of renovating and expanding the terminal to meet passenger needs. In 2002, the new airside hold room and the new arrivals rotunda were rebuilt. By 2005, the new departures area was completed.

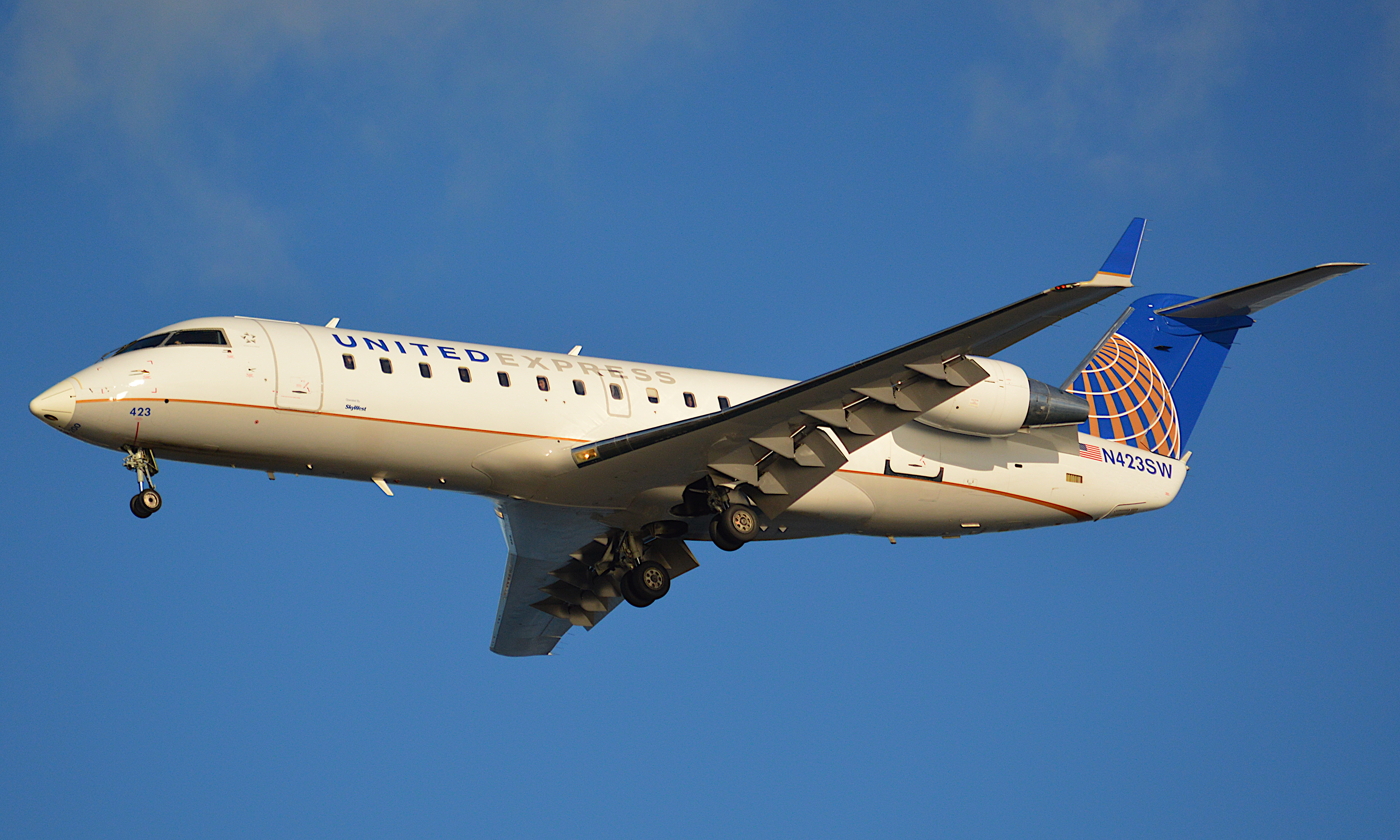
A United Express CRJ200 at Victoria International Airport a week before service ended

In May 2005, the federal government, which owns the land, announced a reduction in the rent paid by the Victoria Airport Authority. This will save $0.6 million each year and $12 million over the life of the lease, which is 50 years.

In 2015, 443 Maritime Helicopter Squadron moved into a new $155 million heliport at the airport, which the RCAF titled Arundel Castle after the major landmark of that name in West Sussex, the English county where the unit operated when it was a fighter squadron flying the Supermarine Spitfire during World War II. The main mission of 443 Squadron in the 21st century is to provide ASW and logistical support for the Royal Canadian Navy. As of 2022, 443 Squadron is responsible for all Canadian west coast operations of the CH-148 Cyclone helicopter.

In July 2016, WestJet announced that they would be permanently ending service to Honolulu from Victoria. The non-stop route had started in 2009 and had ended due to the lack of demand.

In September 2018, United Airlines announced that the daily United Express flight from Victoria to San Francisco would permanently end on January 7, 2019, concluding over a decade of daily non-stop service between the two cities.

In March 2019, Delta Air Lines announced that all Delta flights from Victoria to Seattle would permanently end on September 2, 2019, concluding a three-year presence by the airline in Victoria and leaving Alaska Airlines as the only airline serving Victoria directly from Seattle or anywhere in the United States. Delta was the second airline to leave Victoria that year, after United Airlines withdrew service in January 2019.

== Terminal ==
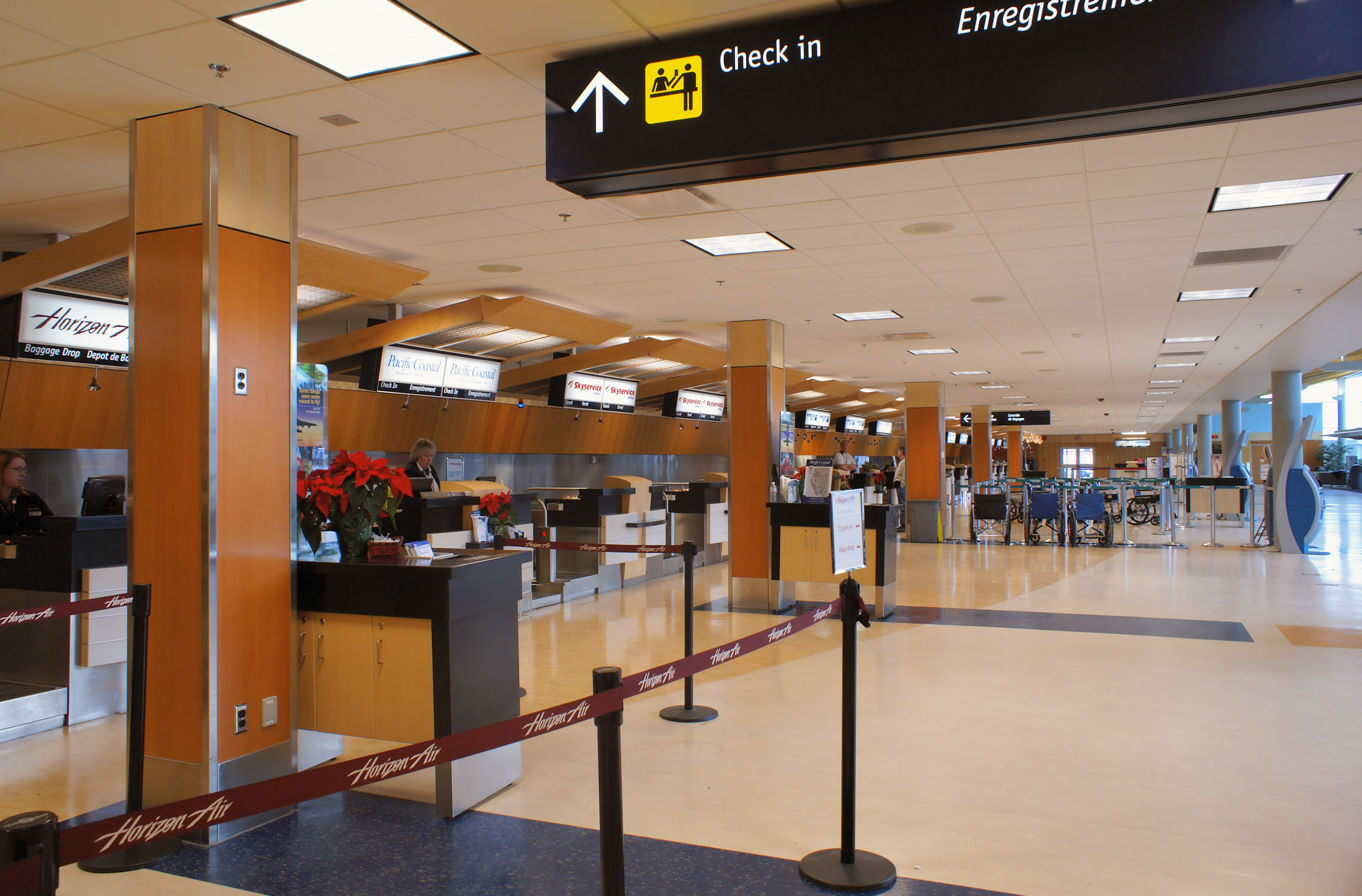
Departure/check-in area

Domestic baggage claim area

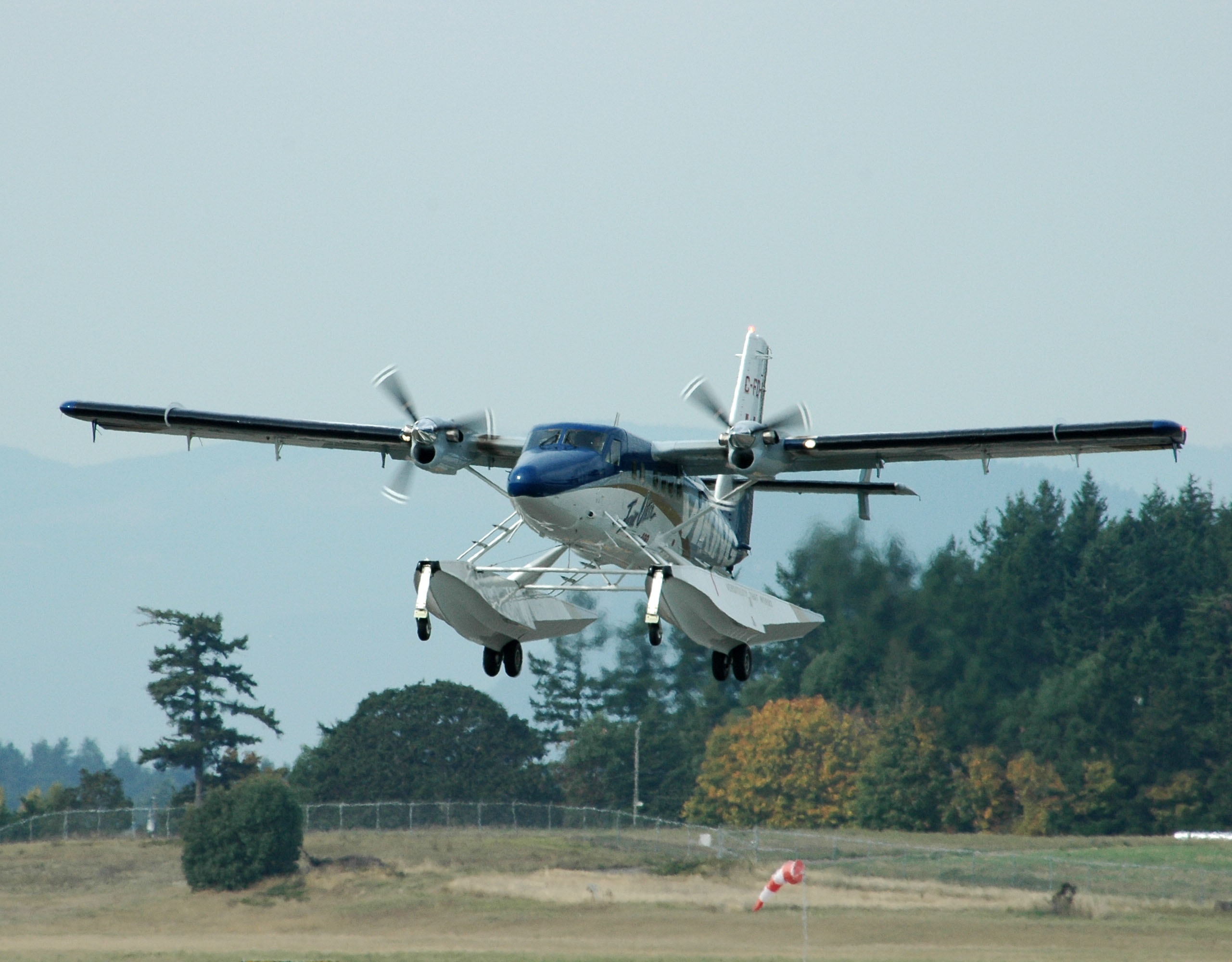
Twin Otter 400, first test flight

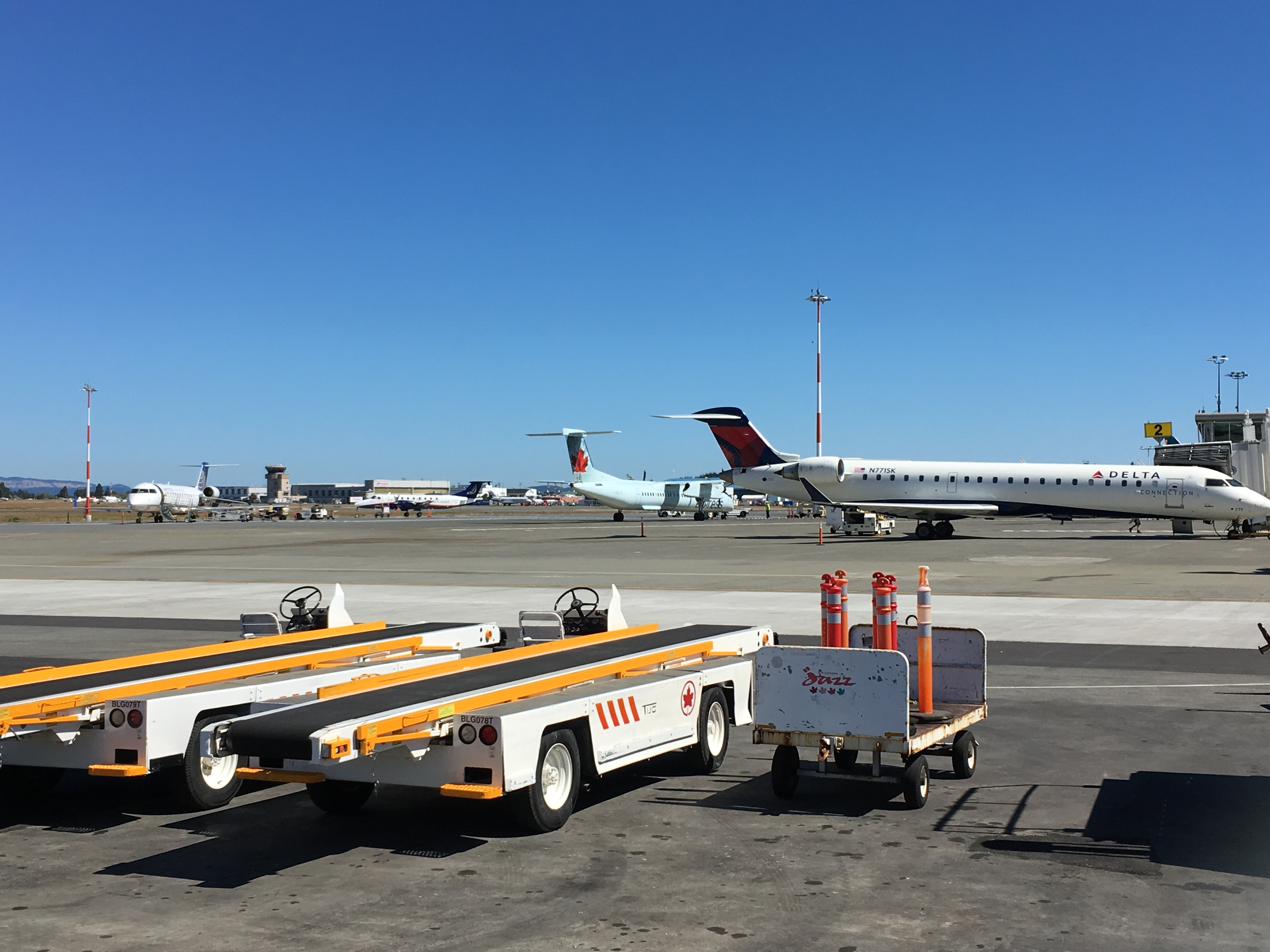
Delta Connection (Skywest), Air Canada Express (Jazz), United Express (Skywest) and Pacific Coastal Airlines aircraft parked at Victoria International Airport in August 2017

The main terminal has eleven gates, organized as gates 3–4, 5–11, and 12–13. Gates 3-4 and 12-13 are equipped with aircraft loading bridges.

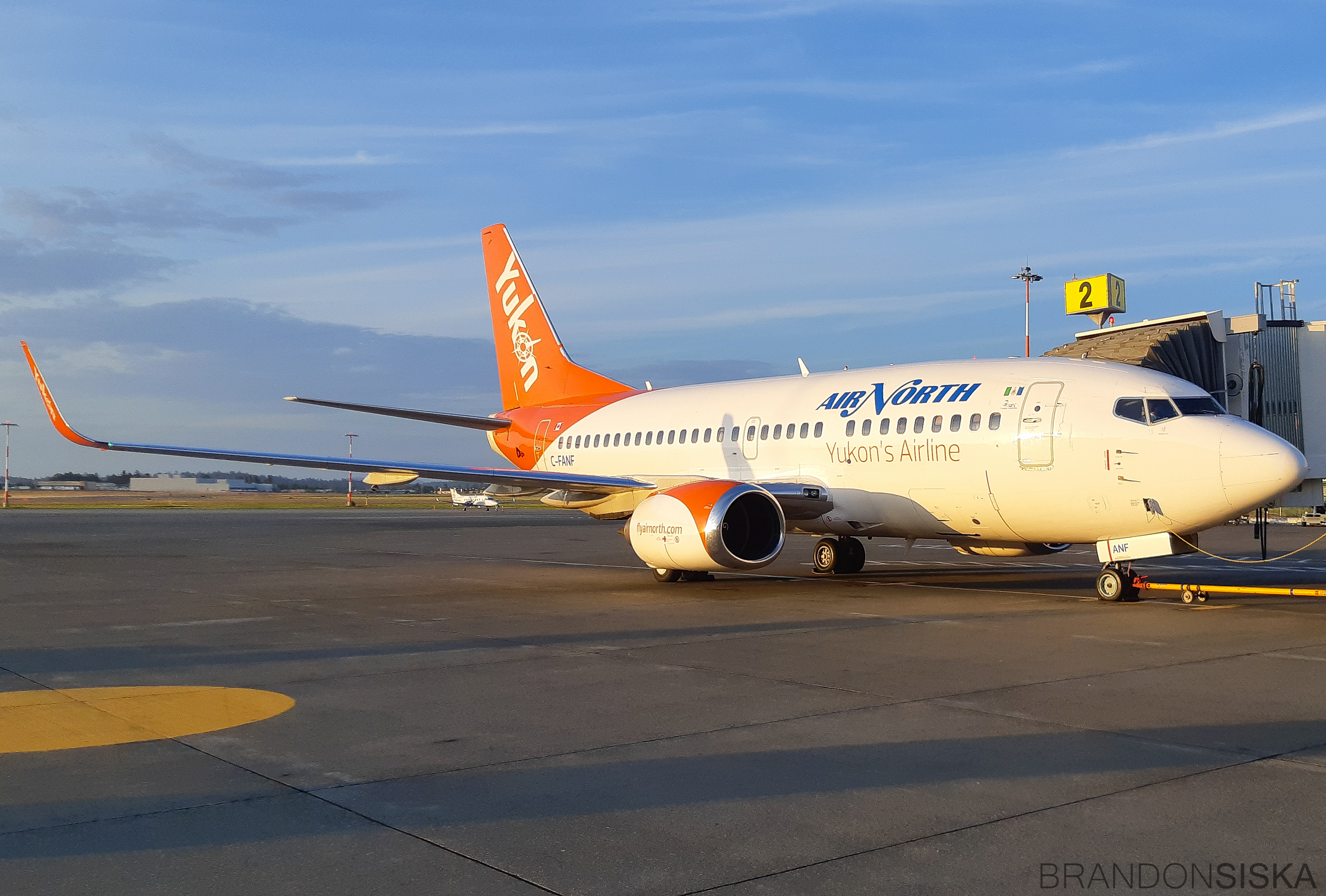
Air North Boeing 737-500 at the gate in Victoria

There are three luggage carousels: two located at the arrivals area for domestic passengers, and one for international flights located inside the customs area.

As of December 1, 2010, time limited, ad supported Wi-Fi internet service provided by Telus is available terminal wide.

== Airlines and destinations ==
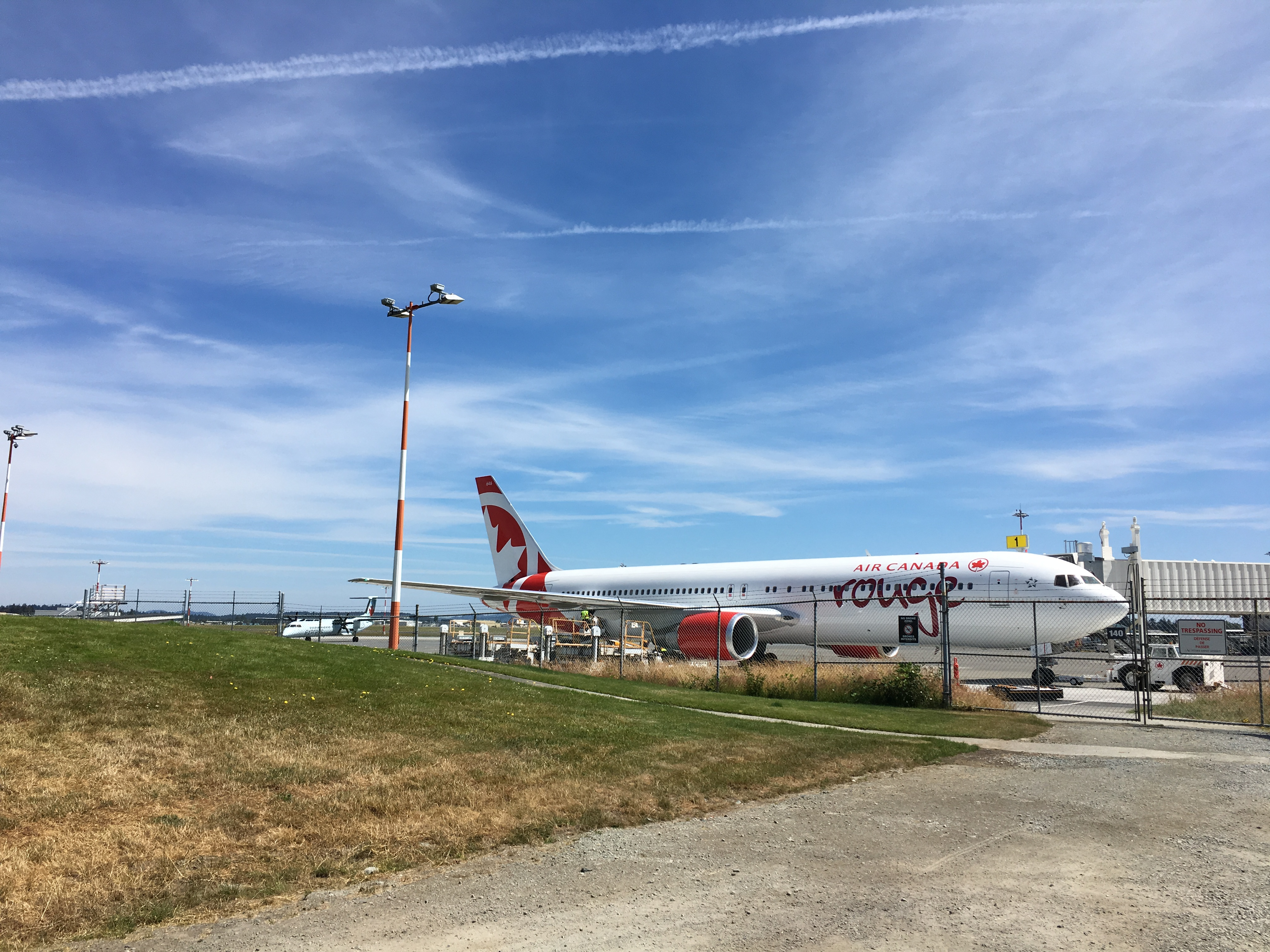
Air Canada Rouge Boeing 767-300 at Victoria (CYYJ), July 2017

Most commercial flights at Victoria fly either to airports in nearby British Columbia and Alberta or to western Washington. Seasonal scheduled flights by WestJet connect Victoria to tourist destinations in Mexico. For the Summer 2017 season, Air Canada Rouge operated wide-body Boeing 767s on its daily flights to Toronto.

=== Passenger ===
Airlines	Destinations
Air Canada	Toronto–Pearson; Seasonal: Montréal–Trudeau
Air Canada Express	Vancouver
Air North	Vancouver, Whitehorse
Alaska Airlines	Seattle/Tacoma
Flair Airlines	Seasonal: Calgary, Edmonton
Harbour Air	Seasonal: Vancouver
Kenmore Air	Friday Harbor
Pacific Coastal Airlines	Kamloops, Kelowna, Prince George, Vancouver
Porter Airlines	Ottawa, Toronto–Pearson
WestJet	Calgary, Edmonton; Seasonal: Cancún, Puerto Vallarta, San José del Cabo, Winnipeg
WestJet Encore	Calgary, Edmonton, Kelowna, Vancouver

== Statistics ==
=== Annual traffic ===
Annual passenger traffic
Year	Passengers	% change
2010	1,514,713	Steady
2011	1,499,792	▼ -1%
2012	1,504,024	▲0.3%
2013	1,556,960	▲3.4%
2014	1,650,904	▲6.0%
2015	1,710,825	▲3.6%
2016	1,856,421	▲8.5%
2017	1,934,842	▲4.2%
2018	2,048,627	▲5.9%
2019	1,924,385	▼6.5%
2020	574,874	▼70.2%
2021	673,748	▲17.2%
2022	1,490,039	▲121.2%
2023	1,740,107	▲16.8%
2024	1,872,033	▲7.4%
2025	1,986,057	▲6.1%

== Development plans ==
The Victoria International Airport Master Plan 2023–2024 lays out the long-term development and future plans of the airport. The Master Plan highlights future infrastructure growth for the airport in two phases, 2023–2032 and 2033–2042.

=== 2023–2032 ===
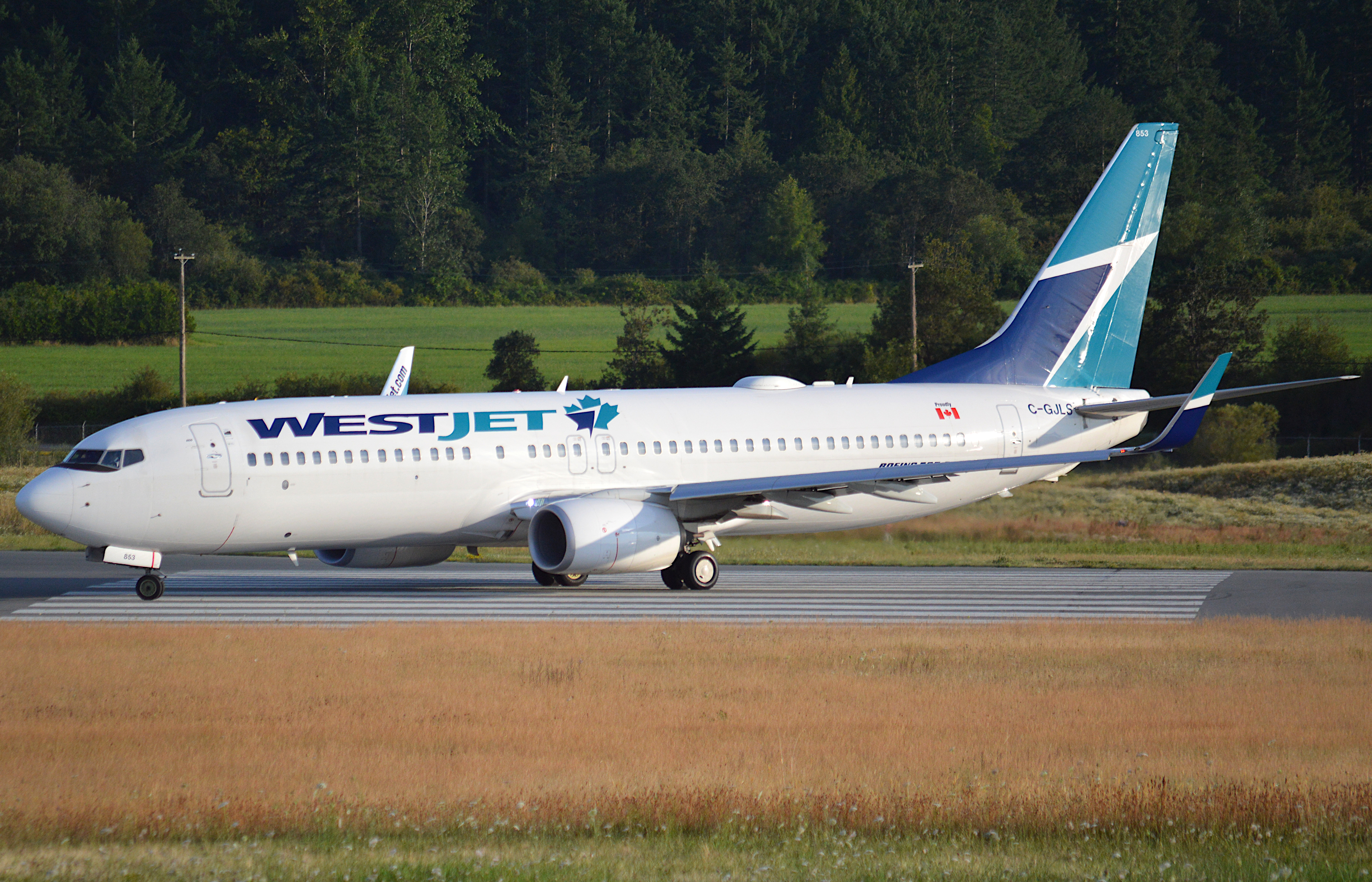
WestJet primarily flies their Boeing 737 Next Generation aircraft to Calgary and Edmonton from Victoria

==== Airfield ====
- Runway end safety areas
- Enhanced taxiway filets for larger aircraft
- Apron IV expansion to support demand growth
- Upgrade Runway 09 approach lighting to CAT I SSALR
- Runway 09-27 extension would provide a greater safety buffer for long haul flights to potential future international destinations

==== Terminal ====
- Eastern expansion to support demand growth for aircraft gates, check-in area, outbound baggage system and offices
- Western expansion to support demand growth for aircraft gates, international/CBSA facilities, and inbound baggage system
- Central expansion to support demand growth for pre-board screening

==== Landside ====
- Expanded Electra Boulevard and development of a roundabout at the new intersection with Willingdon Avenue
- Parking expansion at the terminal building to support demand growth
- Ongoing improvement to the recreational path and supporting areas

==== Commercial ====
- Leasing of commercial lots that are readily available
- Improvements to infrastructure to make additional lots available as required by demand

=== 2033–2042 ===
==== Airfield ====
- Apron IV expansion to support demand growth
- Closure of Runway 03-21 to enable growth of the terminal building and Apron IV
- Northern taxiway development to support demand for airside commercial lots

==== Terminal ====
- Western expansion to support demand growth for aircraft gates

==== Landside ====
- Parking expansion at the terminal building to support demand growth
- Ongoing improvement to the recreational path and supporting areas

==== Commercial ====
- Increased land availability due to closure of Runway 03-21
- Leasing of commercial lots that are readily available
- Improvements to infrastructure to make additional lots available as required by demand

== Flight training ==
There are several organisations that offer flight training at the airport:

- Ocean Air Floatplanes (charter service, tours, float plane training using Cessna 180H)
- Victoria Flying Club (small prop aircraft training, charter service, float plane, Multi-engine IFR Training, Red Bird Simulator)
- Royal Canadian Air Cadets

== Ground transport ==
Victoria International Airport is 22 km from downtown Victoria.

It is served by taxi (Yellow Cab).

BC Transit routes 87 and 88 make connections to the airport. Passengers using BC Transit can connect with intercity bus service in Victoria.

By car, the airport is normally a 20-minute drive from downtown Victoria (with little or no traffic, and a 40-minute drive with traffic) via Highway 17. The airport has short term and long term/daily parking lots next to the terminal with an additional overflow lot. Rental lot is located to the southwest of the terminal building.

A interchange at Highway 17 and McTavish Road, the main highway access point to the airport, was completed in April 2011. Funding for the interchange was shared between the federal, provincial governments and Victoria Airport Authority.

== Fire and rescue ==
Victoria International Airport Fire and Rescue operates three crash tenders and one support vehicle to deal with emergencies at the airport. The current station (Airport Fire Service and Airport Operations) opened in 2010 to replace the former station dating back to World War II.

== Fixed-base operations ==
- Shell Aerocentre
- Vancouver Island Helicopters (VIH)

== See also ==
- British Columbia Aviation Museum
- List of airports in Greater Victoria
  - Victoria Airport Water Aerodrome, adjacent to Victoria International Airport, seaplanes only
  - Victoria Harbour (Camel Point) Heliport, helicopters only, adjacent to cruise ship terminal near downtown Victoria
  - Victoria Inner Harbour Airport, downtown Victoria, seaplanes only
