= List of islands of Washington =

This is a list of selected islands that are part of Washington state.

Island	County	Area	Population			Notes
Island	County	(miles²)	2019	2010	Change	Notes
Island	County		(est)			Notes
Aleck Rocks	San Juan		0	0	0	
Alegria / Little Double Island	San Juan		0	0	0	
Allan Island	Skagit		0	0	0	Previously owned by Microsoft billionaire Paul Allen.
Anderson Island	Pierce	7.75	1,338	1,037	301	
Armitage Island	San Juan		0	0	0	
Baby Island	Island	0.000574	0	0	0	Semi-attached to Whidbey Island at low tide
Bachelor Island	Clark		0	0	0	
Bainbridge Island	Kitsap	27.6	24,520	23,025	1,495	
Bare Island	San Juan		0	0	0	
Barnes Island	San Juan	0.0529687	0	0	0	
Barren Island	San Juan		0	0	0	
Bateman Island	Benton	0.25	33	31	2	
Battleship Island	San Juan	0.005	0	0	0	
Bell Island	San Juan		2	2	0	
Ben Ure Island	Island		6	6	0	
Bird Rocks	San Juan		0	0	0	
Black Rock	San Juan		0	0	0	
Blake Island	Kitsap	0.74	4	4	0	Entire island preserved as Blake Island Marine State Park.
Blakely Island	San Juan	6.5	44	33	11	
Blind Island	San Juan		0	0	0	Entire island preserved as Blind Island Marine State Park.
Boulder Island	San Juan		0	0	0	
Brant Island	Whatcom		0	0	0	
Brown Island	San Juan	0.25	22	17	5	
Buck Island	San Juan		0	0	0	
Burrows Island	Skagit		0	0	0	
Cactus Islands	San Juan		0	0	0	
Camano Island	Island	40.55	17,348	15,650	1,698	Has two state parks, Cama Beach and Camano Island State Park.
Canoe Island	San Juan	0.07	2	2	0	
Castle Island	San Juan		0	0	0	Originally named Old Hundred Island.
Cayou / Rum Island	San Juan		0	0	0	
Cemetery Island	San Juan		0	0	0	
Center Island	San Juan	0.275	20	16	4	
Charles Island	San Juan		0	0	0	
Chuckanut Island	Whatcom		0	0	0	
Chuckanut Rock	Whatcom		0	0	0	Entire island preserved as part of San Juan Islands National Monument.
Clark Island	San Juan	0.09	0	0	0	Entire island preserved as Clark Island Marine State Park.
Cliff Island	San Juan		0	0	0	
Clover Island	Benton	0.25	0	0	0	
Cluster Islands	San Juan		0	0	0	
Colville Island	San Juan		0	0	0	
Cone Islands	Skagit		0	0	0	
Coon Island	San Juan		0	0	0	
Cotton Point Island	San Juan	0.0004	0	0	0	Entire island preserved as part of San Juan Islands National Monument.
Cottonwood Island	Cowlitz		0	0	0	
Crab Island	San Juan		0	0	0	
Craft Island	Skagit		0	0	0	
Crane Island	San Juan	0.37	10	8	2	
Cutts / Crow / Scotts Island	Pierce	0.003	0	0	0	Entire island preserved as Cutts Island State Park.
Cypress Island	Skagit	6.23	10	7	3	
Deadman Island	Skagit		0	0	0	
Deadman Island / Shark Reef	San Juan	0.005	0	0	0	
Debays Island	Skagit		0	0	0	
Decatur Island	San Juan	3.52	96	78	18	
Deception Island	Island		0	0	0	
Destruction Island	Jefferson	0.05	0	0	0	
Dinner Island	San Juan		0	0	0	
Doe Island	San Juan	0.01	0	0	0	Entire island preserved as Doe Island Marine State Park.
Dot Island	Skagit		0	0	0	
Double Island	San Juan		0	0	0	
Eagle Island	Pierce	0.01	0	0	0	Entire island preserved as Eagle Island State Park.
Ebey Island	Snohomish		169	153	16	
Eliza Island	Whatcom	0.22	32	18	14	
Eliza Rock	Whatcom		0	0	0	
Fawn Island	San Juan		0	0	0	
Fidalgo Island	Skagit	41.19	25,289	22,653	2,636	
Fir Island	Skagit	15.5	445	418	27	
Fisher Island	Cowlitz		0	0	0	
Flattop Island	San Juan		0	0	0	
Florence Island	Snohomish					
Flower Island	San Juan	0.007	0	0	0	
Fortress Island	San Juan	0.005	0	0	0	Entire island preserved as part of San Juan Islands National Wildlife Refuge.
Fox Island	Pierce	5.2	4,113	3,625	488	
Freeman Island	San Juan		0	0	0	Entire island preserved as part of San Juan Islands National Monument.
Frost Island	San Juan	0.1	3	3	0	
Goat Island	Skagit		0	0	0	
Goose Island	San Juan	0.006	0	0	0	
Gossip Island	San Juan		0	0	0	
Guemes Island	Skagit		824	667	157	
Guss Island	San Juan		0	0	0	
Hall Island	San Juan		0	0	0	
Harbor Island	King	0.5	0	0	0	
Harnden Island	San Juan		0	0	0	
Harstine Island	Mason	18.7	1,600	1,412	188	
Hart Island	Skagit		0	0	0	
Hat Island	Snohomish	0.6825	84	41		Also known as Gedney Island, located in Possession Sound
Hat Island	Skagit	0.142187	0	0	0	Located in Padilla Bay
Henry Island	San Juan	1.59	30	19	11	
Herron Island	Pierce	0.48	211	151	60	
Holmes Island	Thurston					
Hope Island	Mason	0.165625	0	0	0	
Hope Island	Skagit		0	0	0	
Huckleberry Island	Skagit		0	0	0	
Iceberg Island	San Juan		0	0	0	
Ika Island	Skagit	0.58	0	0	0	
Indian Island	Jefferson	4.36	53	53	0	
Jack Island	Skagit		0	0	0	
Jackson / Whites Island	Wahkiakum		0	0	0	
James Island	San Juan	0.07	0	0	0	
Jetty Island	Snohomish	2.81	0	0	0	
Johns Island	San Juan	0.36	9	9	0	
Jones Island	San Juan	0.29	0	0	0	Entire island preserved as Jones Island State Park.
Ketron Island	Pierce		16	17	-1	
Lawson Rock	San Juan		0	0	0	
Leque Island	Snohomish		0	0	0	
Little Deadman Island	Skagit		0	0	0	
Little Island	Wahkiakum		160	146	14	
Little Patos Island	San Juan		0	0	0	
Little Sucia Island	San Juan		0	0	0	
Locke Island	Adams		0	0	0	Preserved as part of the Hanford Reach National Monument.
Lone Tree / The Sisters Islands	San Juan		0	0	0	
Long Island	Pacific	8.37	0	0	0	
Lopez Island	San Juan	29.81	2,596	2,380	216	
Low Island	San Juan		0	0	0	
Lummi Island	Whatcom	9.25	1,060	946	114	
Lummi Rocks	Whatcom		0	0	0	
Marrowstone Island	Jefferson	6.3	940	844	96	
Matia Island	San Juan	0.23	0	0	0	
Maury Island	King		1,869	1,824	45	
McConnell Island	San Juan	0.05	0	0	0	
McMicken Island	Mason		0	0	0	
McNeil Island	Pierce	6.63	298	1,506	-1,208	
Mercer Island	King	12.9	24,470	22,699	1,771	
Milltown Island	Skagit		0	0	0	
Milltown Island	Snohomish		0	0	0	
Nob Island	San Juan		0	0	0	
North Finger / South Finger Islands	San Juan		3	2	1	
O'Neal Island	San Juan		1	0	1	
Obstruction Island	San Juan	0.34	19	14	5	
Orcas Island	San Juan	57.3	5,632	5,220	412	
Pass Island	Skagit		0	0	0	
Patos Island	San Juan	0.32	0	0	0	Entire island preserved as part of San Juan Islands National Monument.
Peapod Islands	San Juan		0	0	0	
Pearl Island	San Juan	0.06	10	8	2	
Pete Moore Island	Cowlitz		0	0	0	
Picnic / Sheep Island	San Juan	0.002	0	0	0	
Pitt Island	Pierce		0	0	0	
Pointer Island	San Juan		0	0	0	
Portage Island	Whatcom	1.47	0	0	0	
Posey Island	San Juan	0.002	0	0	0	Entire island preserved as Posey Island State Park.
Protection Island	Jefferson	1.03	0	0	0	
Puffin Island	San Juan		0	0	0	
Puget Island	Wahkiakum	7.48	735	685	50	
Raft Island	Pierce	0.31	500	459	41	
Ram Island	San Juan		0	0	0	
Reach / Treasure Island	Mason	0.14	151	119	32	
Reef Island	San Juan		0	0	0	
Richardson Rock	San Juan		0	0	0	
Rim Island	San Juan		0	0	0	
Ripple Island	San Juan		0	0	0	
Saddlebag Island	Skagit	0.04	0	0	0	Entire island preserved as Saddlebag Island State Park.
Samish Island	Skagit		750	626	124	
San Juan Island	San Juan	55.05	8,236	7,578	658	
Satellite Island	San Juan	0.18	0	0	0	
Savage Island	Franklin		0	0	0	
Scarborough Island	Clallam		0	0	0	
Sentinel Island	San Juan		0	0	0	
Shaw Island	San Juan	7.70	260	238	22	
Silcox Island	Pierce		11	10	1	
Sinclair Island	Skagit	1.59	17	13	4	
Skagit Island	Skagit		0	0	0	
Skipjack Island	San Juan	0.06	0	0	0	Entire island preserved as part of San Juan Islands National Wildlife Refuge.
Skull Island	San Juan	0.005	0	0	0	
Smith Island	Island		0	0	0	
Smith Island	Snohomish		3	3	0	
Spencer Island	Snohomish		16	16	0	
Spieden Island	San Juan	0.81	2	2	0	
Spindle Rock	San Juan		0	0	0	
Squaxin Island	Mason	2.216	0	0	0	
Steamboat Island	Thurston	0.01	48	46	2	
Strawberry Island	Island		0	0	0	
Strawberry Island	Skagit		0	0	0	
Stretch Island	Mason	0.47	178	162	16	
Stuart Island	San Juan	2.88	36	29	7	
Sucia Island	San Juan	1.06	0	0	0	
Swirl Island	San Juan		0	0	0	
Tanglewood Island	Pierce	0.03	8	8	0	
Tatoosh Island	Clallam	0.06	0	0	0	
Towhead Island	Skagit		0	0	0	
Trump Island	San Juan		3	3	0	
Turn Island	San Juan	0.05	0	0	0	
Unknown Island 1 / Asotin County	Asotin		0	0	0	
Unknown Island 1 / Benton County	Benton		7	7	0	
Unknown Island 1 / Grant County	Grant		126	113	13	
Vashon Island	King	36.9	8,919	8,800	119	
Vendovi Island	Skagit	0.34	2	2	0	
Victim Island	San Juan		0	0	0	Entire island preserved as part of San Juan Islands National Monument.
Viti Rocks	Whatcom		0	0	0	
Waadah Island	Clallam	0.0636875	0	0	0	
Waldon Island	Cowlitz		11	11	0	
Waldron Island	San Juan	4.6	112	106	6	
Whale Rocks	San Juan		0	0	0	
Whidbey Island	Island	168.67	67,453	62,839	4,614	
Williamson Rocks	Skagit		0	0	0	
Willow Island	San Juan		0	0	0	
Yellow Island	San Juan	0.02	2	2	0	
Young Island	Skagit		0	0	0	
