= San Juan Islands =

Archipelago in the Salish Sea in Washington, US

Coordinates: 48°31′55″N 123°01′45″W

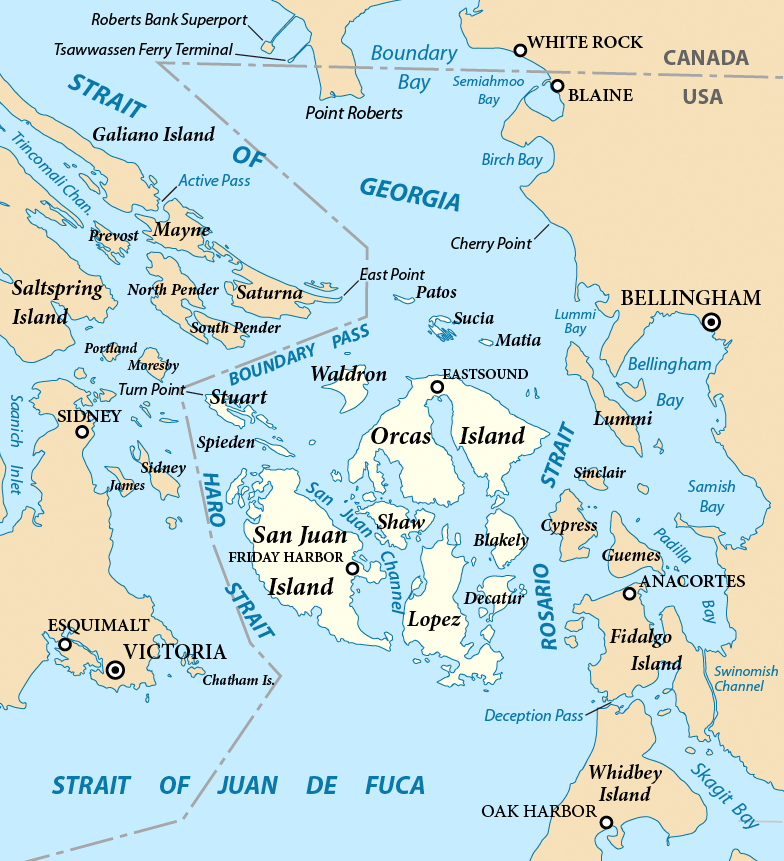
San Juan Islands (in white) and surrounding region

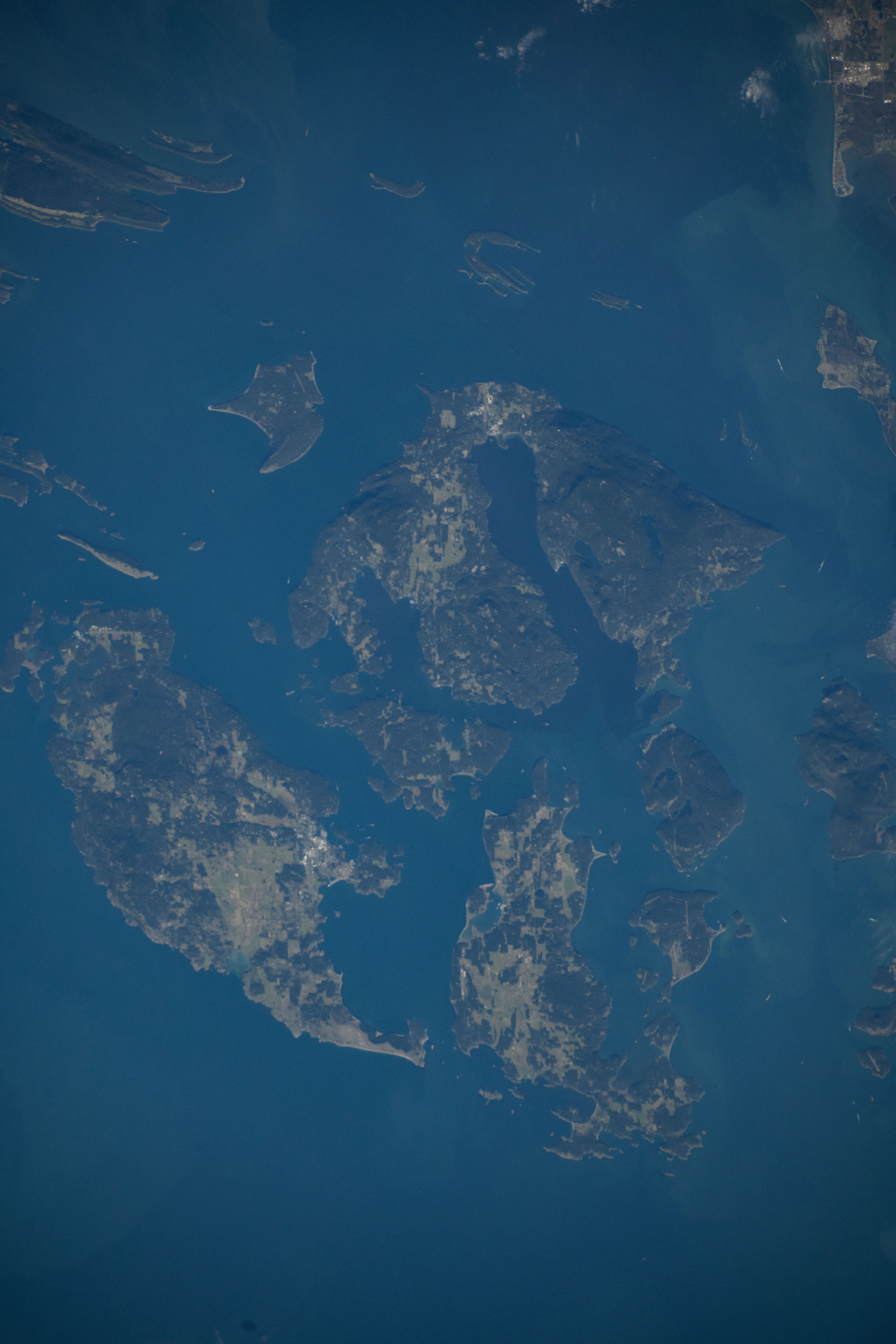
View from Expedition 72, October 2024

The San Juan Islands are part of an archipelago in the Pacific Northwest of the United States between the U.S. state of Washington and Vancouver Island in the Canadian province of British Columbia. The San Juan Islands are part of Washington state, and form the core of San Juan County.

In the archipelago, four islands are accessible to vehicular and foot traffic via the Washington State Ferries system.

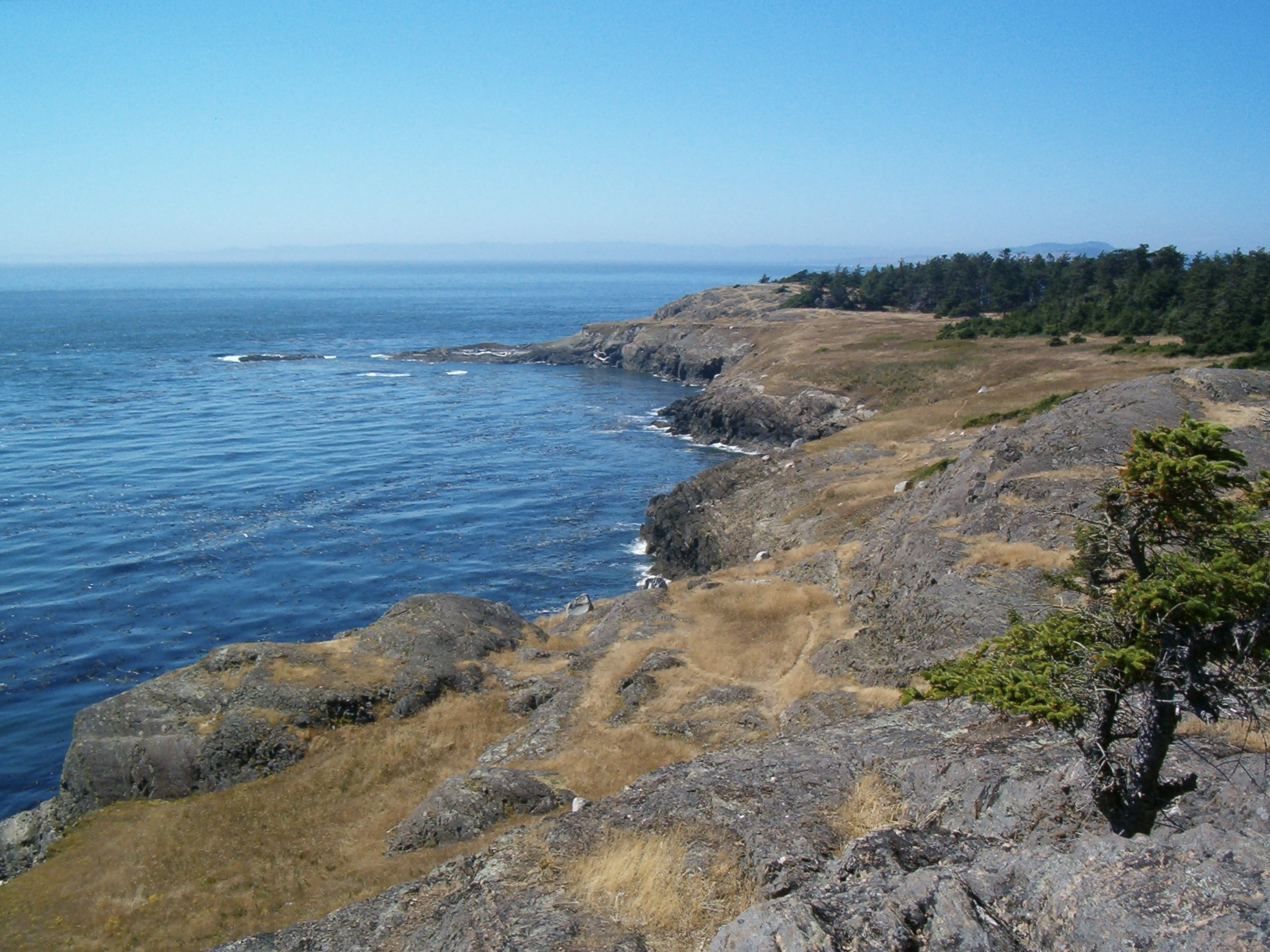
Lopez Island, one of the San Juan Islands, Washington

== History ==
The Gulf of Georgia Culture Area encompasses the San Juan and Gulf Islands, which share many archaeological similarities. These islands were home to various Coast Salish peoples, including the Nooksack and Northern Straits groups (consisting of the Lummi, Klallam, Saanich, Samish, and Songhees dialects). European exploration in the area introduced smallpox in the 1770s.

The Spanish explorer Francisco de Eliza named the San Juan Islands Isla y Archipiélago de San Juan in 1791 while sailing under the authority of Juan Vicente de Güemes Padilla Horcasitas y Aguayo, 2nd Count of Revillagigedo, the Viceroy of Mexico. Eliza named several places for the Viceroy, including Orcas Island (short for "Horcasitas") and Guemes Island. San Juan Island's first European discoverer was Gonzalo López de Haro, one of Eliza's officers, for whom Haro Strait is named. The Spanish had previously encountered the islands during Manuel Quimper's exploring voyage on the Princesa Real in 1790, but they were not recognized as islands until Eliza's expedition. José María Narváez, one of Eliza's pilots, also helped explore the San Juans in 1791 and became the first European to explore the Strait of Georgia.

The Vancouver Expedition, led by George Vancouver, explored the area in 1792 while a Spanish expedition led by Dionisio Alcalá Galiano and Cayetano Valdés y Flores was also exploring. The British and Spanish ships met and cooperated in exploring the north. Vancouver encountered other Spanish ships and traded information, so he was aware of the names given by the Spanish expedition and kept them, although he renamed some features, such as the Strait of Georgia.

The United States Exploring Expedition, led by Charles Wilkes, explored the region in 1841. Wilkes named many coastal features after American heroes of the War of 1812 or members of his crew, possibly unaware of the already existing Spanish names and charts.

Henry Kellett led a project in 1847 to reorganize the official charts of the region for the British Admiralty. The project only applied to British territory, which at the time included the San Juan Islands but not Puget Sound. Kellett removed most of the names given by Wilkes and kept British and Spanish names, sometimes moving Spanish names to replace those given by Wilkes. As a result, Wilkes' names are common in Puget Sound and Spanish names are rare, while the opposite is true for the San Juan and Gulf Islands. Wilkes had named the San Juan Islands the Navy Archipelago and individual islands after U.S. naval officers, such as Rodgers Island for San Juan Island, "Chauncey" for Lopez Island, and Hull Island for Orcas Island. Some of Wilkes' names, such as Shaw, Decatur, Jones, Blakely, and Sinclair, named after American naval officers, survived Kellett's editing.

=== Border dispute ===
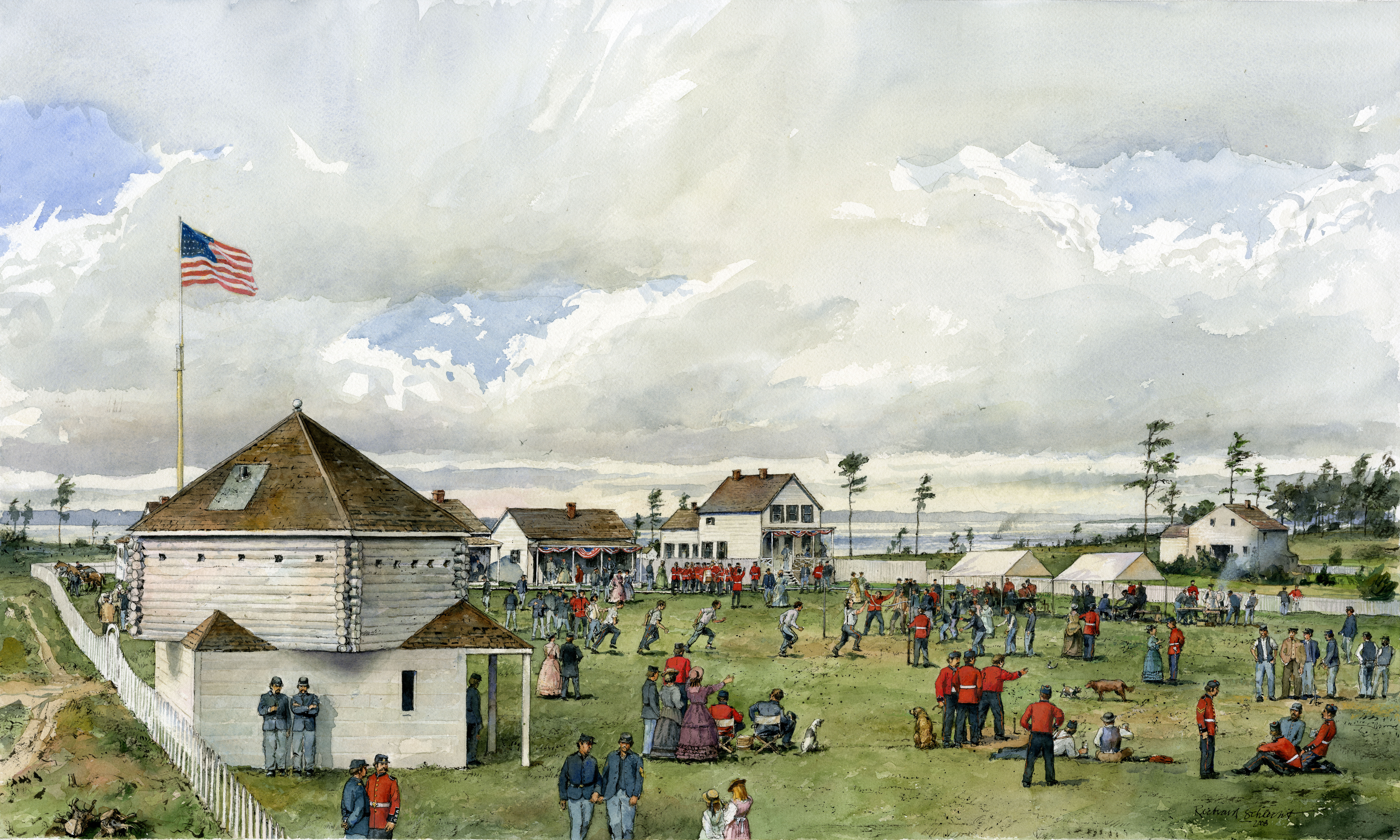
July 4, 1867, celebrated on San Juan Island. U.S. Army soldiers and Royal Marines mingle in the American Camp.

In 1843, the Hudson's Bay Company established Fort Victoria on Vancouver Island. The 1846 Oregon Treaty established the 49th parallel as the border between Canada and the U.S., with Vancouver Island remaining British. The treaty did not specify which channel the border should follow between the Strait of Georgia and the Strait of Juan de Fuca, leading to a boundary dispute. In 1852, the Territory of Oregon created Island County, including the San Juan Islands. In 1853, Island County became part of the Washington Territory, which created Whatcom County out of parts of Island County in 1854. The San Juan Islands were finally split off into present-day San Juan County in 1873.

In 1855, Washington Territory levied a property tax on properties of the Hudson's Bay Company on San Juan Island, which the HBC refused to pay. This led to a dispute with the Colony of Vancouver Island over the ownership of the San Juan Islands, with the U.S. claiming Haro Strait as the border and Britain claiming Rosario Strait. The resulting Pig War and San Juan Dispute were a diplomatic stalemate until the boundary issue was placed in the hands of Emperor Wilhelm I of Germany for arbitration in 1871. The border through Haro Strait was established in 1872.

=== Post-border dispute ===
The surrounding bodies of water, including Puget Sound and the Straits of Georgia and Juan de Fuca, were recognized collectively as the Salish Sea, by the United States in 2009 and by Canada in 2010.

On June 7, 2024, a T-34 plane flown by former astronaut and United States Air Force pilot, Bill Anders, crashed on the San Juan Islands. Anders did not survive the crash.

== Ecology ==
The islands were heavily logged in the nineteenth century, but now have an extensive second-growth coast Douglas fir (Pseudotsuga menziesii var. menziesii), Pacific madrone (Arbutus menziesii), red alder (Alnus rubra) and bigleaf maple (Acer macrophyllum) forest. There are small strands of old-growth Douglas fir and western redcedar (Thuja plicata), mostly within long standing privately held property. In the highlands one also finds grand fir (Abies grandis), western hemlock (Tsuga heterophylla) and other subalpine trees.

The San Juan Islands host the greatest concentration of bald eagles (Haliaeetus leucocephalus) in the contiguous United States. Great blue herons (Ardea herodias), black oystercatchers (Haematopus bachman), and numerous shorebirds are found along the shore and in winter, the islands are home to trumpeter swans (Cygnus buccinator), Canada geese (Branta canadensis) and other waterfowl. Peregrine falcons (Falco peregrinus), northern harriers (Circus cyaneus), barred owls (Strix varia) and other birds of prey are found. In addition diving birds such as rhinoceros auklets (Cerorhinca monocerata), pigeon guillemots (Cepphus columba) and endangered marbled murrelets (Brachyramphus marmoratus) frequent the surrounding seas. Western bluebirds (Sialia mexicana), which were eliminated from the islands 50 years ago because of competition for nesting sites by non-native European starlings (Sturnus vulgaris), were recently restored to San Juan Island thanks to the efforts of volunteers and conservation organizations.

The islands are famous for their resident pods of orcas (Orcinus orca). There are three resident pods that eat salmon, but also some transient orcas that come to take harbor seals (Phoca vitulina). Other marine mammals include river otters (Lontra canadensis), Steller sea lions (Eumetopias jubatus), common minke whales (Balaenoptera acutorostrata), Dall's porpoises (Phocoenoides dalli) and other cetaceans.

Columbia black-tailed deer (Odocoileus hemionus columbianus) are the largest mammals on the San Juan Islands, which are unusual in their historic absence of large carnivores, except for wolves (Canis lupus) which were extirpated in the 1860s. Dr. Caleb B. R. Kennerly, a surgeon and naturalist, collected a wolf specimen on Lopez Island, which is now in the National Museum of Natural History, probably during the Northwest Boundary Survey from 1857 to 1861. Also, there is a specimen of elk in the Slater Museum of Natural History at the University of Puget Sound that was collected on Orcas Island, and old-timers report finding elk antlers on both Lopez and Orcas Islands.

Before 1850, most of the freshwater on the islands was held in beaver (Castor canadensis) ponds, although the aquatic mammal was extirpated by Hudson's Bay Company fur stations at Fort Langley and San Juan Island. Remnants of beaver dams number in the hundreds across the archipelago. Gnawed stumps and beaver sign are now seen on Orcas and other islands, and recolonization by this keystone species is likely to lead to increased abundance and diversity of birds, amphibians, reptiles and plants. In spring 2011 a pair of beaver appeared at Killebrew Lake on Orcas Island, but were killed to avoid flooding a phone company switch box buried under Dolphin Bay Road. These beaver likely swam from the mainland and could have recolonized the islands.

Northern sea otter (Enhydra lutis kenyoni) remains are documented on Sucia Island in the San Juan Islands archipelago. In 1790, Spanish explorer Manuel Quimper traded copper sheets for sea otter pelts at Discovery Bay, for live sea otters captured north of the bay in the "interior" of the Strait of Juan de Fuca. Although historical records of sea otter in the San Juan Islands are sparse, there is a sea otter specimen collected in 1897 in the "Strait of Fuca" in the National Museum of Natural History. When the sea otter finally received federal protection in 1911, Washington's sea otter had been hunted to extinction, and although a small remnant population still existed in British Columbia, it soon died out. Fifty-nine sea otters were re-introduced to the Washington coast from Amchitka Island, Alaska, in the summers of 1969 and 1970, and these have expanded by 8% per year, mainly along the outer west and northwest coast of the Olympic Peninsula. Professional marine mammal biologists verified a single sea otter observed near Cattle Point, San Juan Island, in October 1996. Although the historical numbers of sea otter in the San Juan Islands is not known, the habitat for them may have once been ideal.

In the 1890s non-native European rabbits, an exotic invasive species, began to infest the islands as the result of the release of domestic rabbits on Smith Island. Rabbits from the San Juan Islands were used later for several introductions of European rabbits into other, usually Midwestern, states. The rabbits are pursued by Eurasian red fox (Vulpes vulpes), another non-native species introduced intermittently through the twentieth century.

On the islands is the San Juan Islands National Monument with 75 sections.

== Geography ==
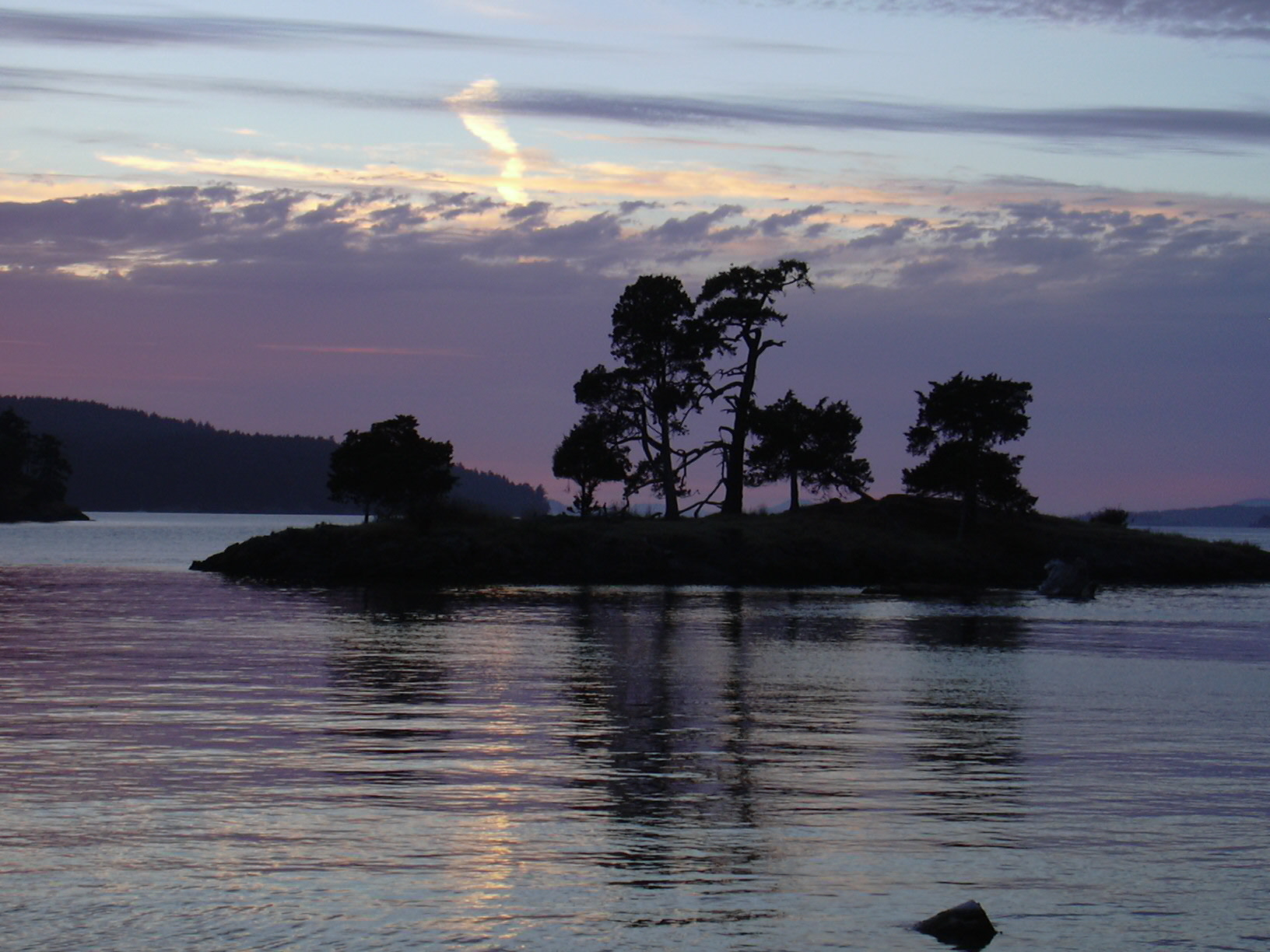
Battleship Island at night looking south towards Henry Island and the Haro Straight

The United States Geological Survey (USGS) defines the San Juan Islands as the archipelago north of the Strait of Juan de Fuca, west of Rosario Strait, east of Haro Strait, and south of Boundary Pass. To the north lie the open waters of the Strait of Georgia. All these waters are within the Salish Sea. The USGS definition of the San Juan archipelago coincides with San Juan County. Islands not in San Juan County are not part of the San Juan Islands, according to the USGS. NOAA notes that, while geopolitically divided, the San Juan Islands and Canadian Gulf Islands geologically form part of a larger Gulf Archipelago.

At mean high tide, the San Juan Islands comprise over 400 islands and rocks, 128 of which are named, and over 478 miles (769 km) of shoreline.

The majority of the San Juan Islands are quite hilly, with some flat areas and valleys in between, often quite fertile. The tallest peak is Mount Constitution, on Orcas Island, at an elevation of 2,407 feet (734 m). The coastlines are a mix of sandy and rocky beaches, shallow inlets and deep harbors, placid coves and reef-studded bays. Gnarled, ochre-colored madrona trees (Arbutus) grace much of the shorelines, while evergreen fir and pine forests cover large inland areas.

The San Juan Islands get substantially less rainfall than Seattle, about 65 miles (105 km) to the south, due to their location in the rain shadow of the Olympic Mountains to the southwest. Summertime high temperatures are around 70 °F (21 °C), while average wintertime lows are in the high 30s and low 40s Fahrenheit (around 5 degrees Celsius). Snow is infrequent in winter, except for the higher elevations, but the islands are subject to high winds at times; those from the northeast sometimes bring brief periods of freezing.

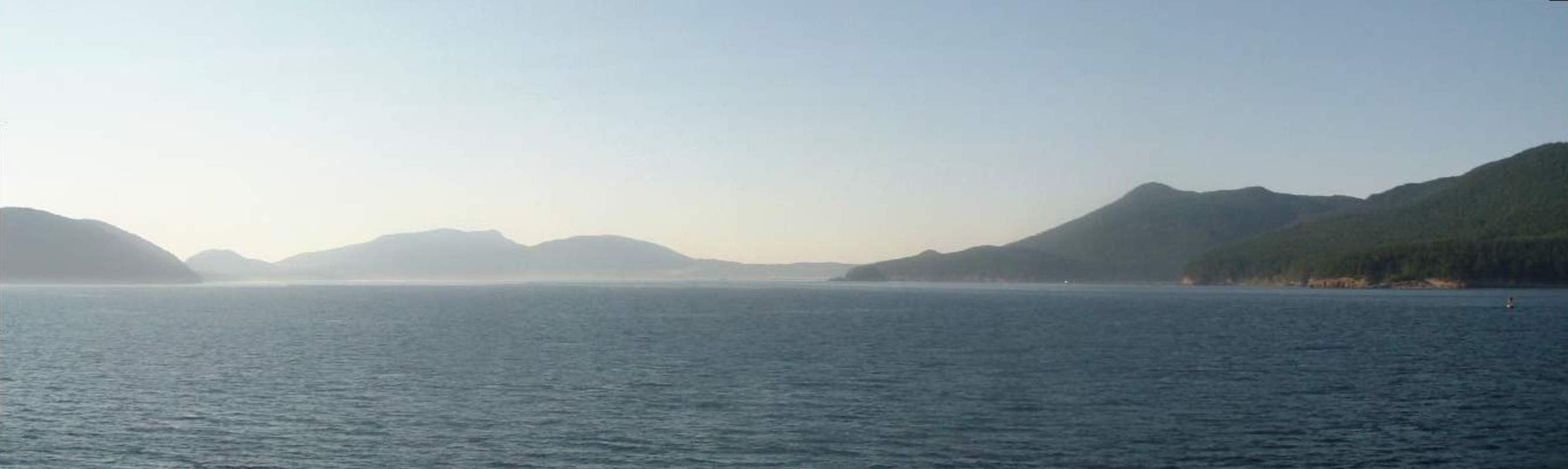
Panoramic view of the San Juan Islands from the ferry

== Present ==
In the present, the San Juan Islands are an important tourist destination, with sea kayaking and orca whale-watching (by boat or air tours) being two of the primary attractions. San Juan Island's Lime Kiln Point State Park is a prime whale-watching site, with knowledgeable interpreters often on site.

Politically, the San Juan Islands comprise by definition, San Juan County, Washington.

Media based in and/or concerning the islands includes the Journal of the San Juan Islands and the Islands' Sounder.

Generally speaking, the resident population of San Juan County is well educated. In the period 2016 to 2020, 51.7 percent of the resident population aged 25 and up have earned a bachelor’s degree or attained a higher level of formal education. Statewide, 36.7 percent of the adult population have a bachelor’s degree or higher.

== Transportation ==
There are no bridges to the San Juan Islands; therefore, all travel from the mainland is either by water or by air.

=== Water ===
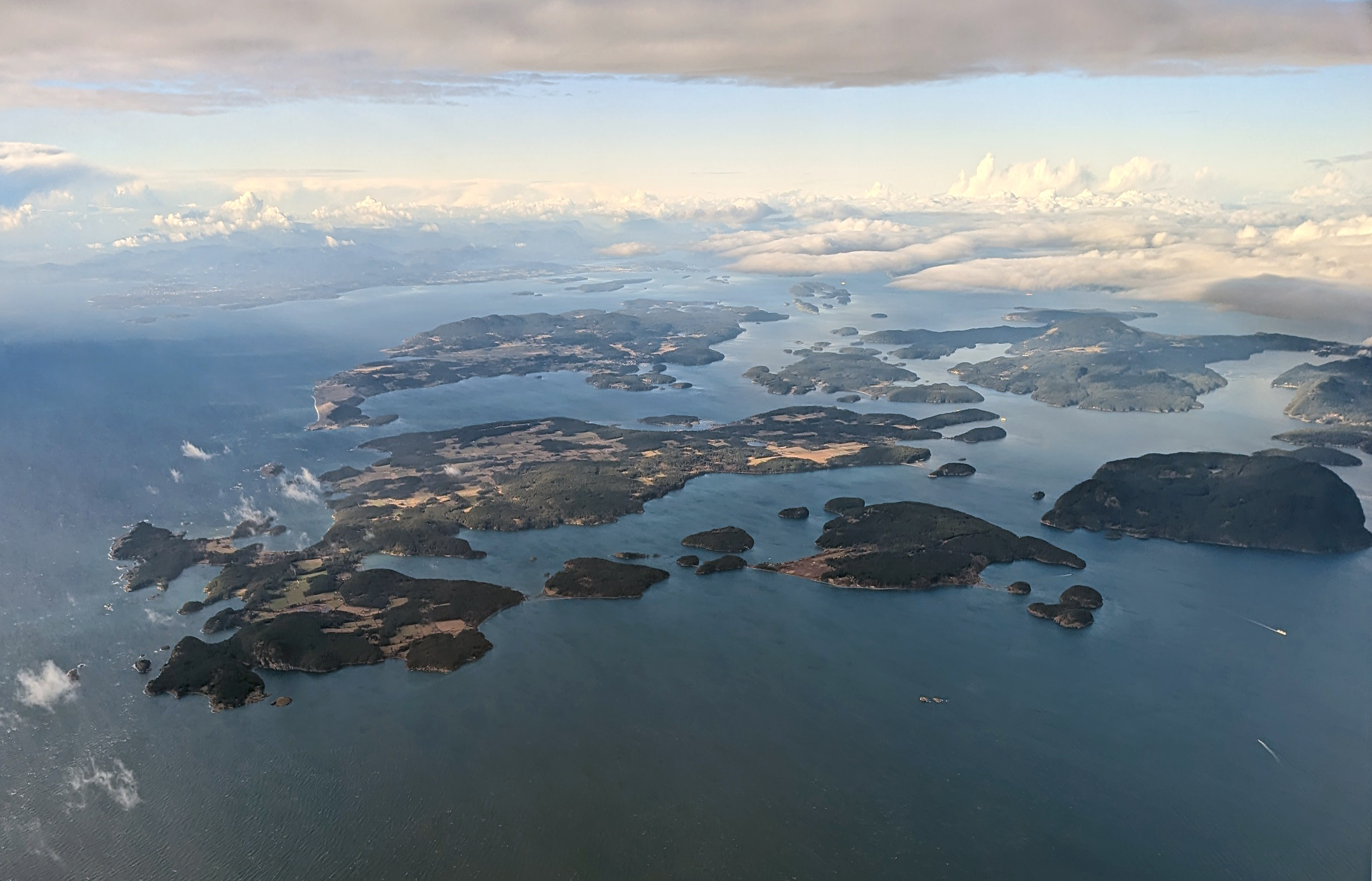
Aerial view of the San Juan Islands from the southeast showing Lopez Island in the foreground

Three ferry systems serve some of the San Juan Islands.

- Washington State Ferries serves Lopez Island, Shaw Island, Orcas Island, and San Juan Island from terminals in Anacortes, Washington, and Sidney, British Columbia.
- Puget Sound Express provides passenger-only service from Port Townsend, on the northeast corner of the Olympic Peninsula, to Friday Harbor on San Juan Island.
- M/V San Juan Clipper of Clipper Navigation, Inc. provides high-speed water-jet–powered catamaran ferry service between San Juan Island and Seattle, Washington.

Passenger-only ferries serve more islands. Passenger-only ferry service is usually seasonal and offered by private business.

- San Juan Cruises offers charter service to Eliza Island, Sinclair Island, Blakely Island, Orcas Island, Lopez Island and daily seasonal service to San Juan Island from the Bellingham Cruise Terminal in Bellingham, Washington.
- North Shore Charters provides high-speed water taxi service to all of the main San Juan Islands.

=== Air ===
There are a number of public and private airports and seaplane bases throughout the San Juan Islands.

Airports:

- Lopez Island: Lopez Island Airport (S31)
- Orcas Island: Orcas Island Airport (KORS)
- San Juan Island: Friday Harbor Airport (KHFR), Roche Harbor (W39)

Seaplane bases:

- Orcas Island: Rosairo (W49)
- San Juan Island: Friday Harbor (W33)

Scheduled and on demand service to the San Juan Islands is provided by:

- Kenmore Air (to and from Roche Harbor, Orcas Island, Seattle/Boeing Field, Seattle/Lake Union)
- San Juan Airlines (to and from Anacortes, Bellingham, Eastsound (Orcas Island), Lopez Island, Blakely, Decatur). They merged with Northwest Sky Ferry, an inter-island carrier serving Bellingham, Anacortes, Friday and Roche Harbors (San Juan Island), Eastsound (Orcas Island) and Lopez, Waldron, Shaw, Stuart, Blakely, Center, Crane, Decatur and Eliza Islands, as well as Seattle.
- Friday Harbor Seaplanes (to and from Renton Municipal Airport/Lake Washington, Friday Harbor and Roche Harbor)

=== Shipping ===
The San Juan Islands are surrounded by major shipping channels. Haro Strait, along with Boundary Pass, is the westernmost and most heavily used channel connecting the Strait of Juan de Fuca and the Strait of Georgia. It is the main route connecting the Port of Vancouver and other ports around the Strait of Georgia with the Pacific Ocean. Haro Strait joins Boundary Pass at Turn Point on Stuart Island, where a major navigation beacon, Turn Point Light, is located. Strong, dangerous rip tides occur near Turn Point, as well as near the northern end of Boundary Pass, between Patos Island Light on Patos Island and East Point on Saturna Island.

Rosario Strait is also a major shipping channel. More than 500 oil tankers pass through the strait each year, to and from the Cherry Point Refinery and refineries near Anacortes. The strait is in constant use by vessels bound for Cherry Point, Bellingham, Anacortes, and the San Juan Islands. Vessels bound for British Columbia or Alaska also frequently use it in preference to the passages farther west, when greater advantage can be taken of the tidal currents.

== List of islands ==
This list includes only those islands that are part of San Juan County as defined by the USGS, bounded by the Strait of Juan de Fuca, Haro Strait, Rosario Strait, Boundary Pass, and the Strait of Georgia. 2016 populations estimates for inhabited islands are in parentheses, though some have major seasonal changes. Islands protected as state parks are marked with an asterisk. Additional small rocks are listed at San Juan Islands National Monument.

- Aleck Rocks
- Alegria Island (aka Little Double Island)
- Armitage Island
- Bare Island
- Barnes Island
- Barren Island
- Battleship Island
- Bell Island
- Big Rock
- Bird Rock
- Bird Rocks
- Black Rock
- Blakely Island (42)
- Blind Island (Lopez)
- Blind Island *
- Boulder Island
- Brown Island (21)
- Buck Island
- Cactus Islands
- Canoe Island
- Castle Island
- Cayou Island (aka Rum Island)
- Cemetery Island
- Center Island (20)
- Charles Island
- Clark Island *
- Cliff Island
- Cluster Islands
- Colville Island
- Coon Island
- Crab Island
- Crane Island (10)
- Deadman Island
- Decatur Island (89)
- Dinner Island
- Doe Island *
- Double Island
- Ewing Island
- Fawn Island
- Flattop Island
- Flower Island
- Fortress Island
- Freeman Island
- Frost Island
- Geese Islets
- Giffin Rocks
- Goose Island
- Gossip Island
- Gull Rock
- Guss Island
- Hall Island
- Harnden Island
- Henry Island (27)
- Iceberg Island
- Iowa Rock
- James Island *
- Johns Island (5)
- Jones Island *
- Justice Island
- Little Patos Island
- Little Sister Island
- Little Sucia Island
- Lone Tree Island
- Long Island
- Lopez Island (2,466)
- Low Island
- Matia Island *
- McConnell Island
- Mummy Rocks
- Nob Island
- North Finger Island
- North Peapod Island
- O'Neal Island
- Oak Island
- Obstruction Island (14)
- Orcas Island (5,395)
- Patos Island *
- Peapod Rocks
- Pearl Island (11)
- Picnic Island (aka Sheep Island)
- Pointer Island
- Pole Island
- Posey Island *
- Puffin Island
- Ram Island
- Reads Bay Island
- Reef Island
- Reef Point Island
- Richardson Rock
- Rim Island
- Ripple Island
- Saddlebag Island *
- San Juan Island (7,810)
- Satellite Island
- Secar Rock
- Sentinel Island
- Shag Rock
- Shaw Island (241)
- Skipjack Island
- Skull Island (Lopez)
- Skull Island
- Small Island
- South Finger Island
- South Peapod Island
- Spieden Island
- Stuart Island (11) *
- Sucia Island (4) *
- Swirl Island
- The Sisters
- Tift Rocks
- Trump Island
- Turn Island *
- Twin Rocks
- Vendovi Island
- Victim Island
- Waldron Island (109)
- Wasp Islands
- Whale Rocks
- White Rocks
- Willow Island
- Yellow Island

== See also ==
- List of islands of Washington (state)
