= Blakeley Island =

Blakeley Island may refer to:

- Blakeley Island (Alabama)
- Blakely Island, Washington
