= Goose Island (San Juan Islands) =

Part of the San Juan Islands, Washington State

Geography
- Location: Pacific Ocean
- Coordinates: 48°27′29.1″N 122°57′24.5″W
- Archipelago: San Juan Islands

Administration
- United States
- State: Washington
- County: San Juan County

Additional information
- Time zone: Pacific (UTC-08:00)
  - Summer (DST): PDT (UTC-07:00)

Goose Island is one of the San Juan Islands in San Juan County, Washington, United States.

== Characteristics ==
The uninhabited island is only 3.789 acres (1.533 ha), and is located at latitude 48° 27' 29" N, longitude 122° 57' 19" W, off the southeastern tip of San Juan Island, in the channel between that island and Lopez Island.

== Nature Conservancy preserve ==
Since 1975 it has been managed as a nature preserve by The Nature Conservancy, following the Management Plan and Baseline Study for Goose and Deadman Island Preserves, along with Deadman Island. Visiting the island is prohibited, except for researchers from the University of Washington's Friday Harbor Laboratories.
