= Guss Island =

Coordinates: 48°35′5″N 123°9′14.8″W

Guss Island is a small island in the San Juan Islands of the U.S. state of Washington. It lies in Garrison Bay, on the northwestern shore of San Juan Island.

The island was named for Guss Hoffmaster, a German storekeeper in the English Camp during the Pig War.

Primarily, the park has had relations with the Lummi Indian Business Council. The Lummi believe Guss Island to be their point of origin into this world. [4] As discussed under archaeological resources, several burials were removed from Guss Island in Garrison Bay. In 1985 the park, with assistance from Jim Thomson and Kent Bush of the Pacific Northwest regional office, began negotiating for the return and reinterment of the burials to the Lummi. A Memorandum of Understanding was drafted with the council, calling for the park to provide a 30' x 30' space for the reburials. The Lummi were to provide the container and actually complete the reburial process. The agreement was signed and several remains reburied, although the container delivered to the site was never used and eventually disposed of by the park. Monitoring of remains at the park and relations with the Lummi have more recently been handled by Seattle Support Office anthropologist, Dr. Fred York.
