= Odostomia engbergi =

Scientific classification
- Kingdom: Animalia
- Phylum: Mollusca
- Class: Gastropoda
- Family: Pyramidellidae
- Genus: Odostomia
- Species: O. engbergi

Binomial name
- Odostomia engbergi Bartsch, 1920

Species of gastropod

Odostomia engbergi is a species of sea snail, a marine gastropod mollusc in the family Pyramidellidae, the pyrams and their allies.

This species was named for Dr. Carl C. Engberg.

== Distribution ==
This marine species occurs in the Pacific Ocean off San Juan Island, Puget Sound, State of Washington, USA.
