= Dinner Island =

Island in Washington, United States

Coordinates: 48°30′26″N 123°0′30″W

- Interactive map of Dinner Island

Geography
- Location: Salish Sea
- Archipelago: San Juan Islands
- Area: 9.1 acres (3.7 ha)
- State: Washington
- County: San Juan

Dinner Island is an island in the San Juan Islands of the U.S. state of Washington. It lies in Griffin Bay on the southeastern coast of San Juan Island.

The name comes from the landing of a party from a British vessel who ate dinner on the island.

Dinner Island, as well as the nearby Brown Island, were used for sheep herding by early settlers. The main flocks of ewes was kept on San Juan Island, while the rams were kept on the smaller nearby islands during most of the year and rowed over during breeding season. This technique was also used by indigenous people for wooly dogs before American and British settlers arrived in the islands.
