= Pearl Island (Washington) =

Coordinates: 48.615545°N 123.165115°W

Pearl Island is one of the San Juan Islands of San Juan County, Washington, United States. Named during the 1841 Wilkes Expedition, it lies off the western shore of San Juan Island, between it and Henry Island. Pearl Island has a land area of 0.151 km² (37.3 acres), only one family lives on Pearl Island full time. It harbors a small population of deer, otters, and song birds.
