= Obstruction Island =

Island in Washington, United States

Coordinates: 48.594209°N 122.813368°W

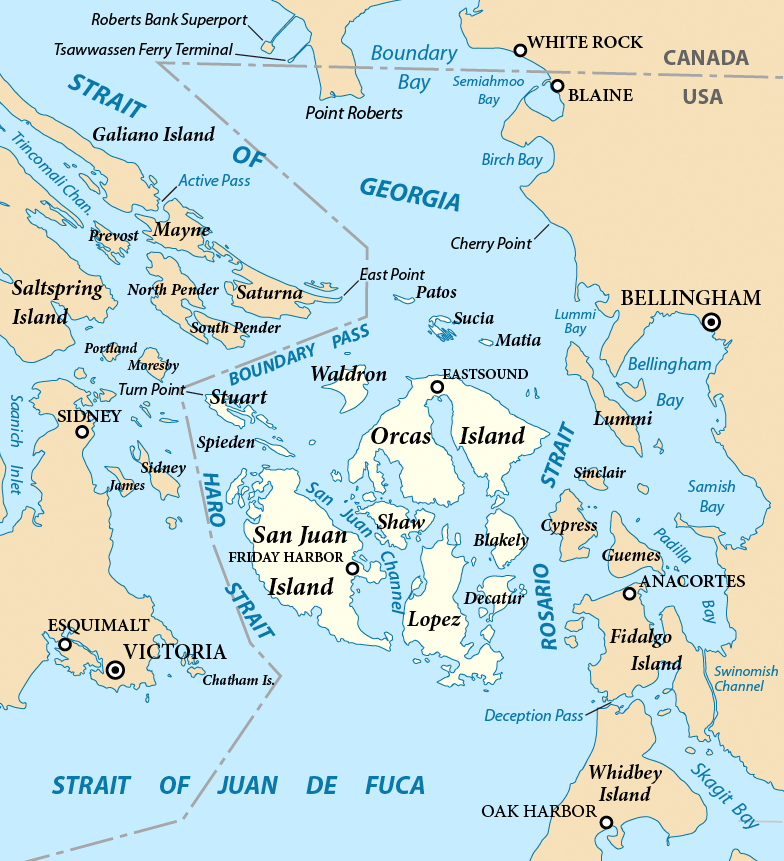
Obstruction Island is between Orcas Island and Blakely Island

Obstruction Island is one of the San Juan Islands in San Juan County, Washington, United States. It lies off the southeast tip of Orcas Island, between it and Blakely Island. Obstruction Island has a land area of 0.882 km^{2} (0.3406 sq mi, or 218 acres). The 2010 United States census reported a permanent population of 14 residents.
