= Yellow Island =

Island in Washington state, US

Coordinates: 48.5923°N 123.0320°W

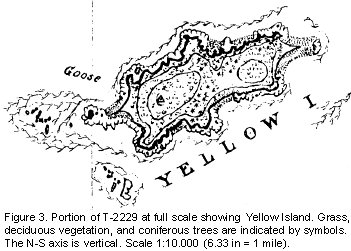
A map of Yellow Island from 1895.

Yellow Island, one of the San Juan Islands, is an 11-acre (4.5 ha) island, located south-west of Orcas Island, and north of Shaw Island, near Jones Island State Park, in San Juan County, Washington, United States. The island is home to a wide array of flora and fauna, including over 50 species of wildflowers, bald eagles, harbor seals, black oystercatchers, and harlequin ducks. The island was purchased in 1979 by The Nature Conservancy, and is administered as a nature preserve.

== History ==
Before the arrival of Europeans, the island was used by the indigenous population for harvesting plant foods such as the roots of the camas flower. Intentional burning kept the tree population in check, helping to maintain the prairies needed for camas. Lewis and Elizabeth Dodd bought the island in the fall of 1945, and sold it in 1979 to The Nature Conservancy, who administer it as a nature preserve.
