= Crane Island (Washington) =

Island of the San Juan Islands in northwest Washington, United States

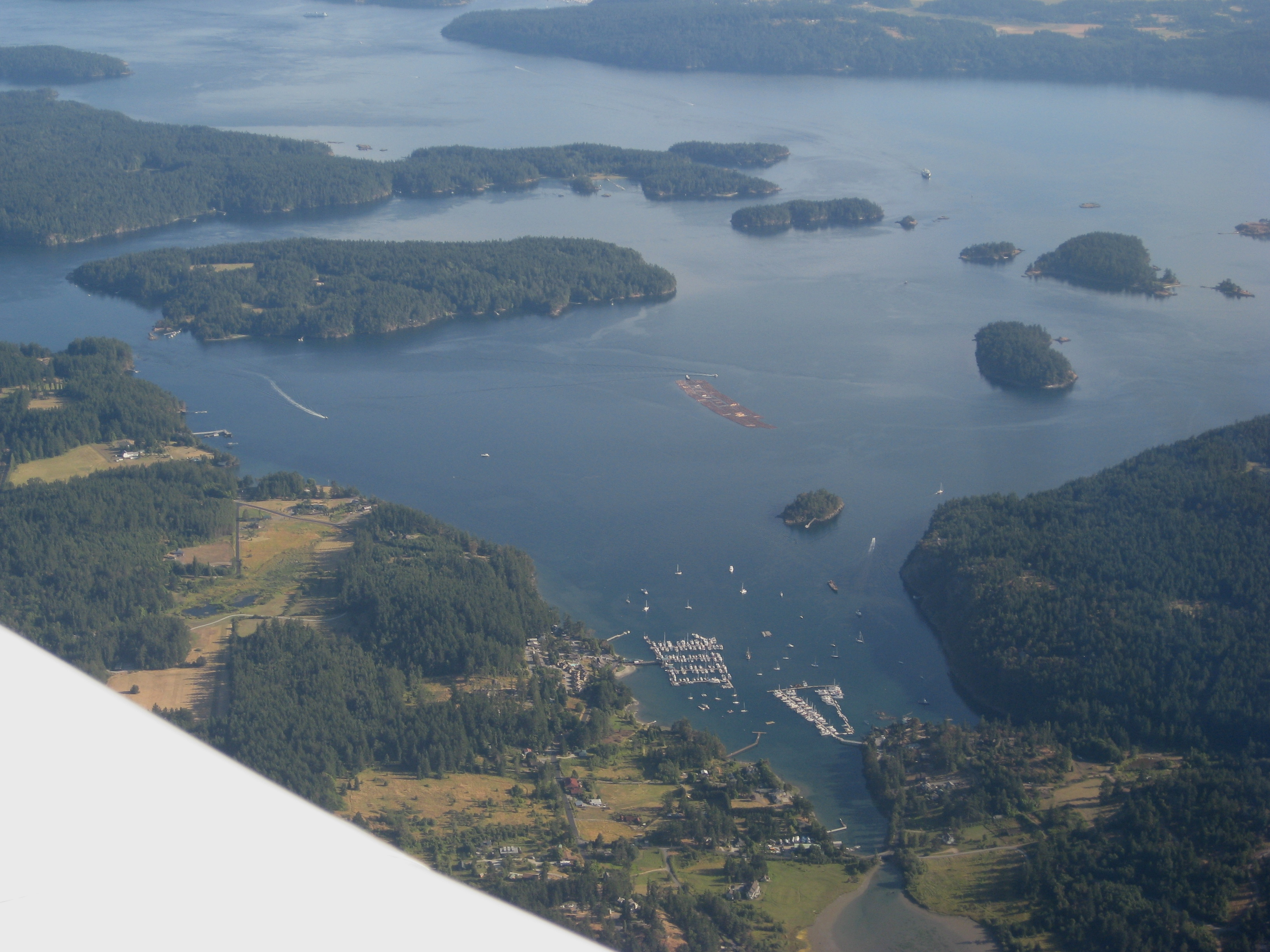
- View from Deer Harbor; Crane Island is in the upper left
- Interactive map of Crane Island

Geography
- Location: Pacific Northwest
- Coordinates: 48.597117°N 122.998255°W
- Archipelago: San Juan Islands
- Area: 0.369 sq mi (0.96 km^{2})

Administration
- United States
- State: Washington
- County: San Juan County

Demographics
- Population: 20 (2000)

Crane Island is one of the San Juan Islands, San Juan County, Washington, United States. It lies just off the southwestern shore of Orcas Island, between it and the northwest corner of Shaw Island. Crane Island has a land area of 0.369 sq mi (0.96 km^{2}). The 2000 census reported a population of 20 permanent residents.

As of 2010 many of the original full-time residents of Crane Island have moved off the island and have been replaced by younger, part-time residents. The number of permanent residents on Crane Island may be as few as four persons.

== History ==
Crane Island is the largest of a group of islands known as the Wasp Islands. The name was given by Charles Wilkes during the Wilkes Expedition of 1838-1842, in honor of the Wasp, a sloop-of-war commanded by Jacob Jones during the War of 1812.

Crane Island was first settled in 1879 by Walter P. Cadwell, a member of a pioneer family living near Pole Pass (a passage between the eastern side of Crane Island and Orcas Island). Cadwell operated a fruit and vegetable farm on Crane Island. In 1906 Cadwell sold the island to John C. Hammond of Seattle. Other activities conducted on Crane Island in the past have included a lime quarry on the west side of the island, a pheasantry business, sheep ranching and logging activities until 1959. (from "Around and About Crane Island", 8/1989)

=== 2022 aviation incident ===
On February 7, 2022, a Rugby Aviation Cessna 207 doing business as San Juan Airlines suffered significant damage after landing on the airstrip from Bellingham International Airport, Washington, due to insufficient remaining stopping distance, with a contributing factor being the pilot-in-command's unfamiliarity with the airstrip. San Juan Airlines issued a self-recommendation to not use Cessna 207 aircraft for the Crane Island airstrip, alongside additional self-recommendations. There were no injuries.

== Geography ==
The Wasp Islands are often locally called "the rock pile" due to the large number of rocks near the shorelines of the various islands. The center of the island is largely owned by the Crane Island Nature Preserve.

== Infrastructure ==
The majority of the homes on Crane Island are located near the island's shore line. A small, private community dock is located on the east side of the island near Pole Pass. In 1960, Island Properties began development and subdivision of Crane Island.

The Washington State ferry passes south of Crane Island through Wasp Passage on its trip to and from Orcas Island and San Juan Island.

There are no public services on Crane Island. The original development of Crane Island included the construction of an airstrip. The airstrip is a private field limited to use by the island's residences. The airstrip consists of a 1,500-foot (460 m) gravel/grass runway. Landing can be tricky because the prevailing wind is often across the runway and the wind can decrease suddenly when dropping below the tree tops.
