= Wasp Islands =

Island group in Washington, United States

Coordinates: 48°35′41″N 123°1′39″W

The Wasp Islands are a group of small islands in the San Juan Islands of the U.S. state of Washington.

The name was given by Charles Wilkes during the Wilkes Expedition of 1838–1842, in honor of the sloop Wasp, a sloop of war commanded by Johnathan Blakeley during the War of 1812.
