= Skull Island (Washington) =

Islands in San Juan Archipelago, Washington state

Skull Island is the name of two small islands in the San Juan Archipelago in the U.S. state of Washington. The northernmost Skull Island is located off the coast of Orcas Island in Massacre Bay, the most northern extension of the island's West Sound. It is identified as 3.2-acre (1.3 ha) Skull Island State Park Property by the Washington State Parks and Recreation Commission. It was named for holding skulls and bones of a band of Lummi who were killed by raiding Haida in 1858. Since 2013, it has been part of the San Juan Islands National Monument.

Another Skull Island in the same archipelago is located exactly fourteen miles south-southeast at 48°27′56″N 122°49′59″W in Mud Bay, part of Lopez Sound, between the Sperry Peninsula of Lopez Island and Fortress Island.

== See also ==
- Skull Islet
