= Rosario Strait =

Waterway in northwest Washington, US

Coordinates: 48.5°N 122.75°W

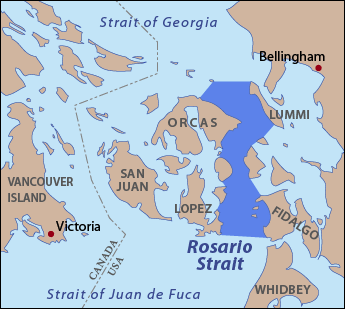
Rosario Strait connects the Strait of Juan de Fuca and the Strait of Georgia, east of the main San Juan Islands. This map follows the USGS definition of the strait. Major islands are named.

Rosario Strait is a strait in northern Washington state, separating San Juan County and Skagit and Whatcom Counties. It extends from the Strait of Juan de Fuca about 23 kilometres (14 mi) north to the Strait of Georgia. The USGS defines its southern boundary as a line extending from Point Colville on Lopez Island to Rosario Head on Fidalgo Island, and its northern boundary as a line from Point Migley on Lummi Island to the east tip of Puffin Island (just east of Matia Island) and then to Point Thompson on Orcas Island. Rosario Strait runs north-south between Lopez, Decatur, Blakely, and Orcas Islands on the west, and Fidalgo, Cypress, Sinclair, and Lummi Islands on the east.

Rosario Strait is a major shipping channel. More than 500 oil tankers pass through the strait each year, to and from the Cherry Point Refinery and refineries near Anacortes. The strait is in constant use by vessels bound for Cherry Point, Bellingham, Anacortes, and the San Juan Islands. Vessels bound for British Columbia or Alaska also frequently use it in preference to the passages farther west, when greater advantage can be taken of the tidal currents.

== History ==
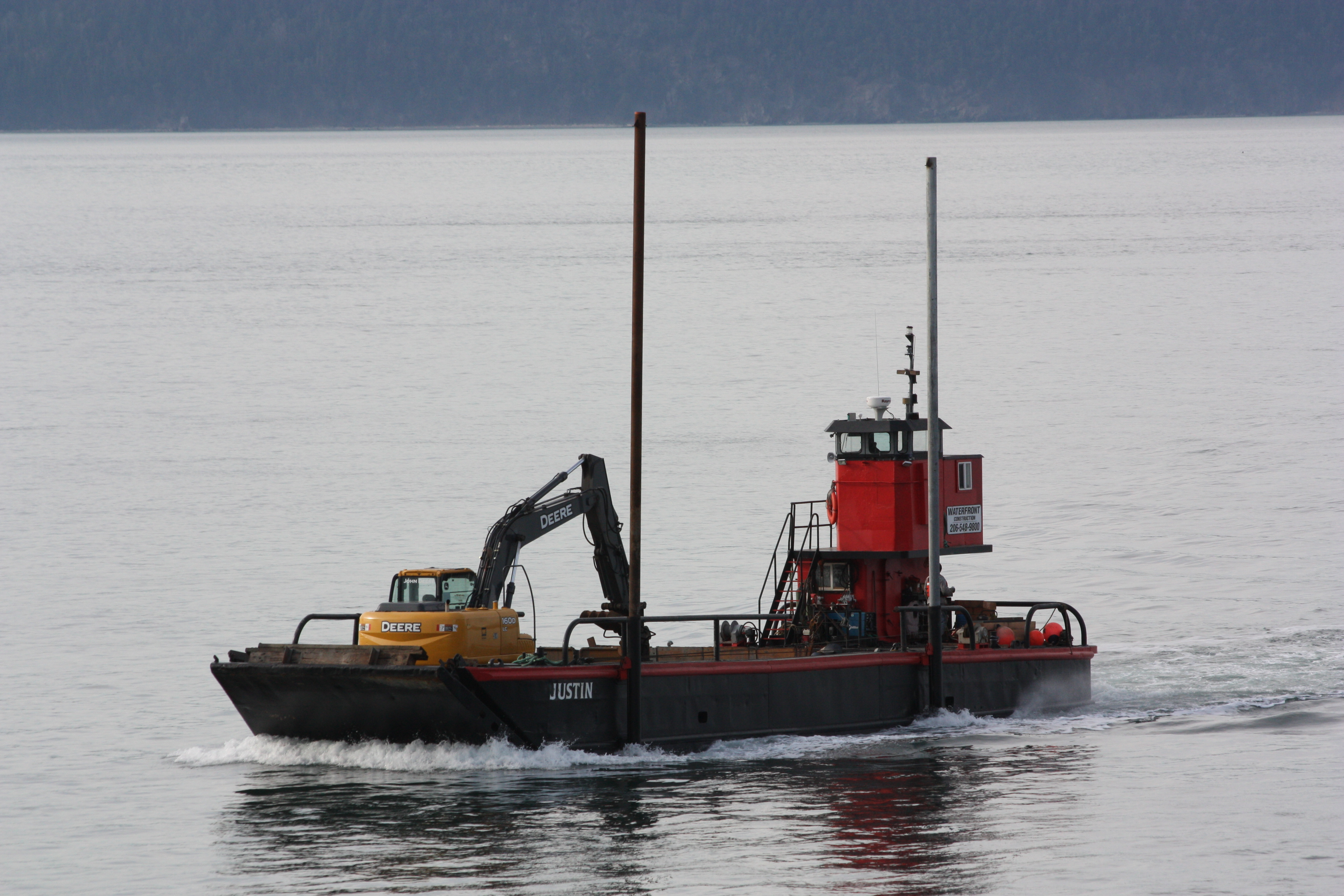
Converted LCM-8 landing craft, Justin, on Rosario Strait

In 1790 the Spanish explorers Manuel Quimper and Juan Carrasco, sailing aboard Princesa Real, gave the name Boca de Fidalgo, in honor of Salvador Fidalgo, to Rosario Strait, which was thought to be a bay. In 1791 José María Narváez renamed it Canal de Fidalgo after determining it was a strait. Also in 1791 Francisco de Eliza gave the name Gran Canal de Nuestra Señora del Rosario la Marinera to what is now the Strait of Georgia. In 1792, George Vancouver explored the region and gave the Strait of Georgia its present name after King George III. He did not provide a name for Rosario Strait. In 1847 Charles Wilkes, during the Wilkes Expedition, gave Rosario Strait the name Ringgold Channel after one of his officers. Then in 1847 the British Captain Henry Kellett reorganized the British Admiralty charts, in the process removing the "pro-American" names given by Wilkes and affirming pro-British names and Spanish names. He affirmed the name Gulf of Georgia (Strait of Georgia) given by George Vancouver and used a shortened version of Eliza's name for the Strait of Georgia to replace both Wilkes' and Eliza's original names for Rosario Strait.

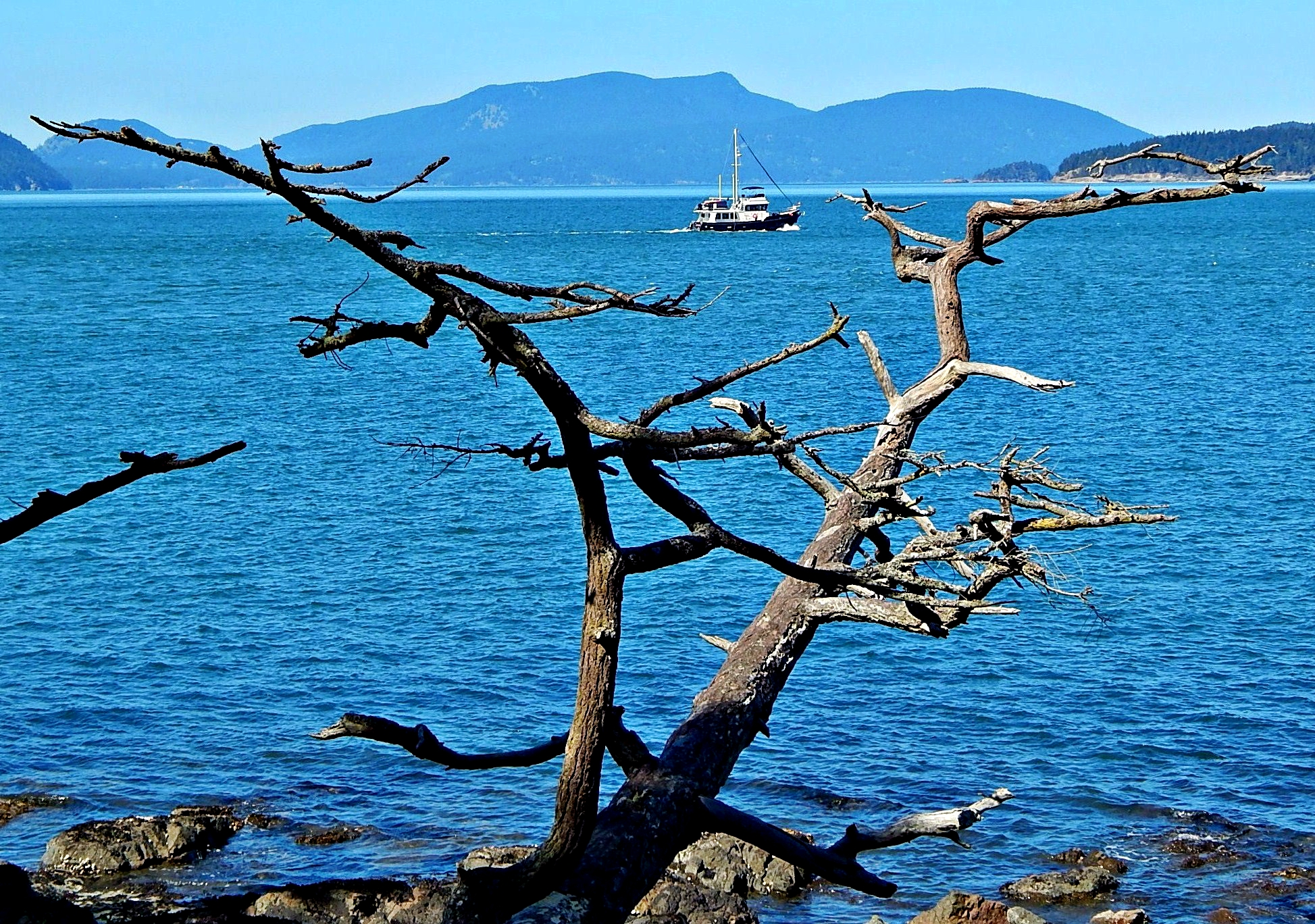
Rosario Strait seen from Washington Park, Anacortes, WA

Following the Oregon Treaty it was assumed by the British to be the route of the deepest channel to the open sea from the 49th Parallel boundary's terminus in the middle of the Strait of Georgia, and is in fact the shortest shipping route. Haro Strait, west of the San Juan Islands, which is wider though somewhat longer, was the American preference for the boundary and its eventual location following the arbitration of the dispute over the San Juan Islands, known as the Pig War.
