= Johns Island (Washington) =

Island in the San Juan Islands

Coordinates: 48.6660°N 123.1533°W

Johns Island is one of the San Juan Islands in San Juan County, Washington. It lies just east of Stuart Island and north of Spieden Island. Johns Island is home to Camp Nor'wester, a summer camp for children on the west end of the island, and several dozen private vacation cabins on the east end of the island. It has a land area of 0.9083 km^{2} (0.3507 sq mi, or 224.45 acres). As with many of the outlying San Juan Islands, Johns Island does not have electricity or plumbing. There was a resident population of five persons as of the 2000 census.
