= O'Neal Island =

Coordinates: 48°36′13.5″N 123°5′33.5″W

O'Neal Island is a small island in the San Juan Islands of the U.S. state of Washington. It lies off the northeastern coast of San Juan Island.

The name was given by Charles Wilkes during the Wilkes Expedition of 1838–1842, in honor of an American naval hero.
