= Freeman Island =

Island in Washington, United States

Coordinates: 48°41′55″N 122°57′3.6″W

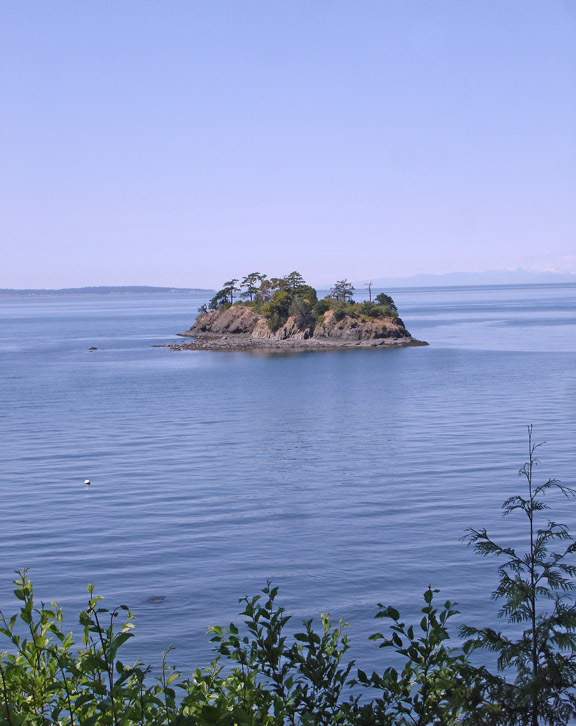
Freeman Island from the west shore of Orcas Island; July 2008.

Freeman Island is a tiny island in the San Juan Islands of the U.S. state of Washington, west of Orcas Island. It is part of the San Juan Islands National Monument (Bureau of Land Management). The name was given by Charles Wilkes during the Wilkes Expedition of 1838–1842, originally as Freeman's Island, in honor of J.D. Freeman, the sailmaker of the expedition's Peacock.

Freeman island sits just off YMCA Camp Orkila.
