= Flower Island (San Juan Islands) =

- Location within Washington (state)

Geography
- Location: San Juan County, Washington
- Coordinates: 48°32′42″N 122°51′14″W
- Archipelago: San Juan

Administration
- United States

Flower Island is one of the San Juan Islands in San Juan County, Washington, USA. The uninhabited, rocky island has a land area of 4.6 acres (1.9 hectares) and is almost completely devoid of vegetation. Located off the coast from Spencer Spit State Park, it is a popular nesting location for gulls.

Flower Island was occupied for two summers in the 1930s by Floyd and Ruth Schmoe and their children while Floyd Schmoe was studying at the Friday Harbor Laboratories. Because the island was not, at the time, listed on tax rolls, the Schmoes were able to claim squatters' rights.

Currently, Flower Island is part of the San Juan Islands National Wildlife Refuge and is managed by the U.S. Fish and Wildlife Service. As with almost all of the islands in the refuge, human access is prohibited and boats may not approach to within 200 yards (180 m).
