= Spieden Island =

Private island in the San Juan Islands

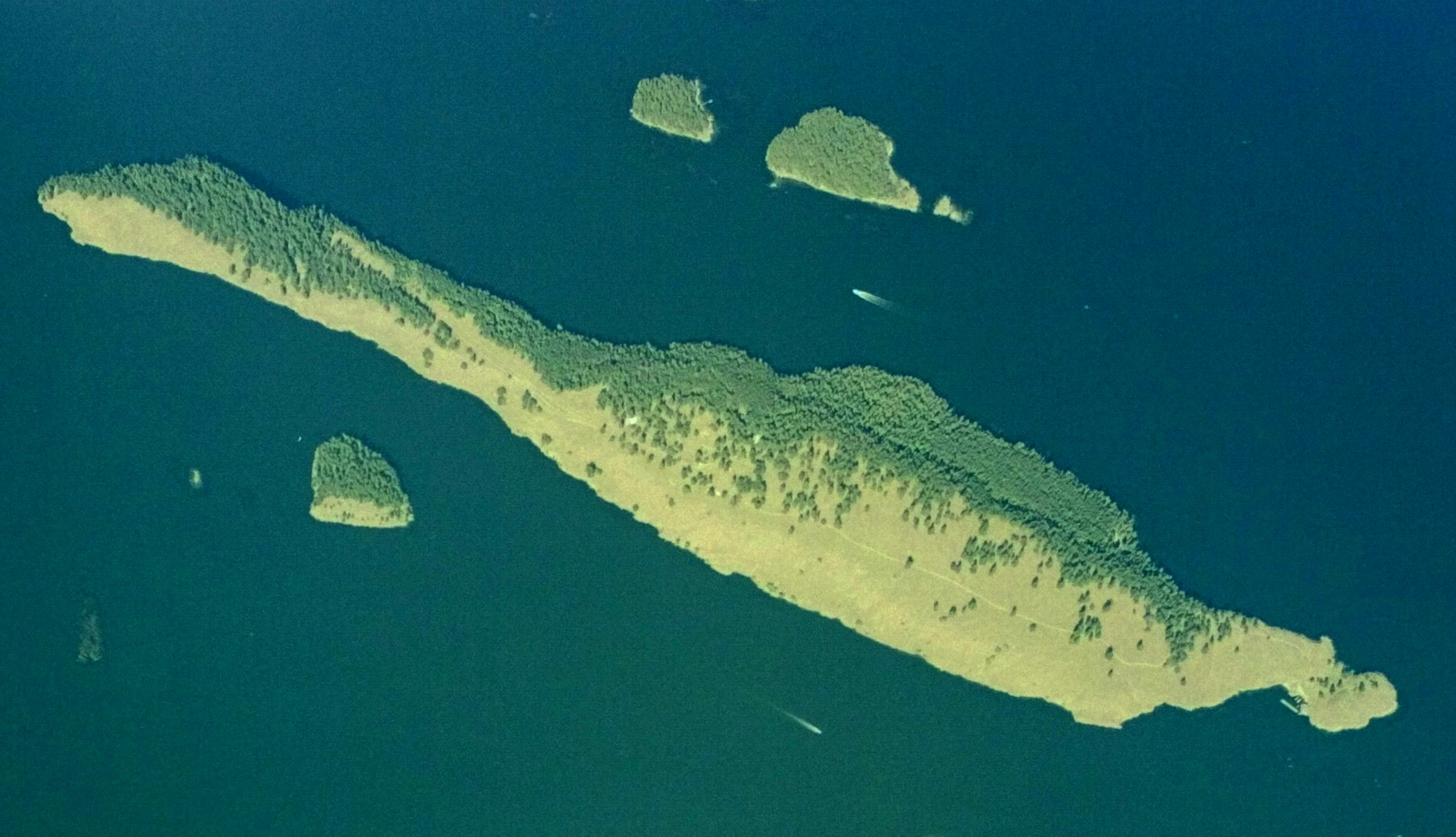
- Spieden Island, 1989.

- Location within Washington (state) Location within the United States

Geography
- Location: Pacific Northwest
- Coordinates: 48.6413°N 123.1365°W
- Archipelago: San Juan Islands
- Area: 516.4 acres (209.0 ha)
- Length: 2 mi (3 km)
- Width: 1/2 mi (1 km)
- Highest elevation: 374 ft (114 m)

Administration
- United States
- State: Washington
- County: San Juan County

Demographics
- Population: 0 (2000)

Spieden Island is a privately owned island in the San Juan Archipelago in the U.S. state of Washington. It has a land area of 516.4 acres (209.0 ha) and no permanent resident population as of the 2000 census, although several structures are present on various parts of the island. The island was purchased by James Jannard, founder and major shareholder of Oakley, Inc., in 1997 through a shell company and is still owned by him as of 2019. It is accessible by boat only.

== Geography ==
Approximately two miles long and 1/2 mile across at its widest point, it is less than a mile north of San Juan Island, across the Spieden Channel. The highest point of the island is approximately 374 feet above sea level. The north side is heavily forested, but the south side is largely barren. The south side features many glacial erratics, large boulders deposited by glacial activity in the past.

== History ==
Spieden Island was named by Charles Wilkes during the Wilkes Expedition of 1838–1842, to honor William Spieden, the purser of the expedition's Peacock.

In the 1970s and 1980s, the island was used for big game hunting; non-native game animals such as Mouflon sheep from Corsica, fallow deer from Europe, and Sika deer from Asia – along with approximately 2,000 exotic birds such as African guinea fowl – were brought to the island. A hunting lodge, airstrip, and small hangar were built to accommodate visitors. The venture was short-lived, however, partially due to environmental concerns and also due to the risk of errant shots reaching nearby San Juan Island, which is relatively populated. The imported species continue to survive on the island.

The Island Institute, an environmental education camp run by Jane Howard, was once located on the island. It is no longer in operation.

== Notes ==
- Spieden Island: Blocks 4001 and 4002, Census Tract 9603, San Juan County, Washington United States Census Bureau
