= Sheep Island (Washington) =

Island of the San Juan Islands in Washington, United States

Coordinates: 48°37′39″N 122°57′30″W

Sheep Island or Picnic Island is one of the San Juan Islands in San Juan County, Washington, in the United States. It is a tiny island lying just off the eastern shore of West Sound, Orcas Island. Sheep Island has a land area of 6,193 square meters (1.530 acres), with a recorded elevation of 23 feet (7.0 m).

The 2000 United States census reported a permanent population of two persons on the island.
