= Frost Island =

Island in Washington, United States

Coordinates: 48°32′20″N 122°50′46″W

Frost Island is an island in the San Juan Islands of the U.S. state of Washington. The approximately 70-acre (28 ha) island has no public electric service or land-line telephone service.

The name was given by Charles Wilkes during the Wilkes Expedition of 1838–1842, in honor of John Frost, the boatswain of the expedition's Porpoise.
