= Pig War (1859) =

United States–United Kingdom border dispute

- — San Juan Islands — US — UK — Border proposed by the US — Border proposed by the UK — Compromise proposal — Modern border
Date	June 15 – October 1859 (troops stationed on San Juan Island until 1874)
Location	San Juan Islands 48°27′42″N 123°00′24″W
Result	Bloodless war
Territorial changes	San Juan Islands awarded to the United States following third-party arbitration by the German Empire in 1871

Belligerents
United States: Washington Territory	United Kingdom: Colony of Vancouver Island

Commanders and leaders
Silas Casey; William S. Harney; George Pickett	James Douglas; R. L. Baynes; Geoffrey Hornby

Strength
461 combatants, 14 cannons	2,140 combatants; 5 warships mounting 70 cannons

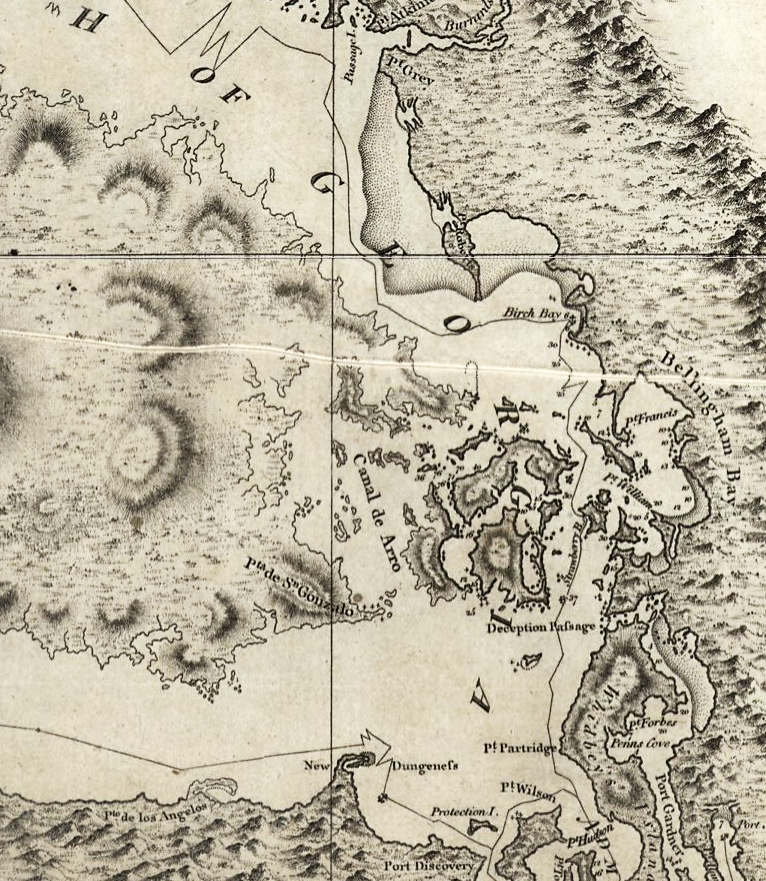
Vancouver's 1798 map, showing some confusion in the vicinity of southeastern Vancouver Island, the Gulf Islands, and Haro Strait

The Pig War was a confrontation in 1859 between the United States and the United Kingdom over the British–U.S. border in the San Juan Islands, between Vancouver Island (present-day Canada) and the Washington Territory (present-day State of Washington). The Pig War, so called because it was triggered by the shooting of a pig, is also called the Pig Episode, the Pig and Potato War, the San Juan Boundary Dispute, and the Northwestern Boundary Dispute. Despite being referred to as a "war", there were no human casualties on either side, only a pig.

== Background ==
=== Border ambiguity ===
The Oregon Treaty of June 15, 1846, resolved the Oregon boundary dispute by dividing the Oregon Country/Columbia District between the United States and Britain (future Canada) "along the 49th parallel of north latitude to the middle of the channel which separates the continent from off-shore Vancouver Island, and thence southerly through the middle of the said channel, and of the Strait of Juan de Fuca, to the Pacific Ocean."

However, two straits could be called the middle of the channel: Haro Strait, along the west side of the off-shore San Juan Islands; and Rosario Strait, along the east side.

In 1846, there was still some uncertainty about the region's physical geography. The most commonly available maps were those of Royal Navy Captain George Vancouver, published in 1798, and of the United States Navy's Charles Wilkes, published in 1845. In both cases, the maps are unclear in the vicinity of the southeastern coast of Vancouver Island and the Gulf Islands. As a result, Haro Strait is not fully clear either.

In 1856, the U.S. and Britain set up a Boundary Commission to resolve several issues regarding the international boundary, including the water boundary from the Strait of Georgia to the Strait of Juan de Fuca. The British appointed James Charles Prevost, as First Commissioner, George Henry Richards as Second Commissioner, and William A. G. Young as Secretary. The U.S. appointed Archibald Campbell First Commissioner, John Parke, Second Commissioner, and William J. Warren Secretary. On June 27, 1857, the American and British commissioners met for the first time on board the British Royal Navy warship HMS Satellite, anchored in Esquimalt Harbour. The two sides met several more times in 1857 in Esquimalt Harbour and Nanaimo Harbour, and corresponded by letter between meetings. The water boundary was discussed from October to December. From the start, Prevost maintained that Rosario Strait was required by the treaty's wording and was intended by the treaty framers, while Campbell had the same opinion for Haro Strait.

Prevost held that the channel specified in the treaty must have three essential qualities:

- it must separate the continent from Vancouver Island
- it must carry the boundary in a southerly direction
- it must be navigable

Only Rosario fulfilled these requirements, he wrote. Campbell countered that the expression "southerly", in the treaty, was to be understood in a general sense, that Rosario Strait did not separate the continent from Vancouver Island, but the San Juan Islands from Lummi Island, Cypress Island, Fidalgo Island, and others, and that navigability was not germane to the issue, but even if it was, Haro Strait was the wider and more direct passage. Finally, he challenged Prevost to produce any evidence showing that the treaty framers had intended Rosario Strait. Prevost responded to the challenge by referring to American maps showing the boundary running through Rosario Strait, including one by John C. Frémont, produced for and published by the US government, and another by John B. Preston, Surveyor General of Oregon in 1852. To the other points, Prevost repeated his statements about Rosario Strait's navigability—the channels between Lummi, Cypress, and Fidalgo islands not being navigable—and that a line through Rosario would be southerly. At the same time, one through Haro would have to be drawn westerly. The two continued to discuss the issue into December 1857, until it was clear what each side's argument was and that neither would be convinced of the other. Prevost made a final offer at the sixth meeting, on December 3. He suggested a compromise line through San Juan Channel, which would give the US all the main islands except San Juan Island. This offer was rejected and the commission adjourned, agreeing to report back to their respective governments. Thus ambiguity over the water boundary remained.

Because of this ambiguity, both the United States and Britain claimed sovereignty over the San Juan Islands. During this period of disputed sovereignty, Britain's Hudson's Bay Company established operations on San Juan and turned the island into a sheep ranch. Meanwhile, by mid-1859, twenty-five to twenty-nine American settlers had arrived.

San Juan Island held significance not for its size, but as a military strategic point. While the British held Fort Victoria on Vancouver Island to the west, overlooking the Strait of Juan de Fuca, the entry point to Haro Strait, leading to the Strait of Georgia, the nation that held the San Juan Islands would be able to dominate all the straits connecting the Strait of Juan de Fuca with the Strait of Georgia.

=== Political context ===
Future Union Army General-in-Chief, George B. McClellan (who was also George Pickett’s classmate at the United States Military Academy at West Point, New York and lifelong friend), claimed that General William S. Harney, and Pickett conspired with a cabal, to start a war with Britain (United Kingdom), creating a common enemy, to head off a north–south confrontation. However, General Granville O. Haller, disputed General McClellan's later theory. He said they had wanted to start a war, but with hope of distracting the North so that the South could secede from the federal Union. The theories are given credence when it is noted that later Major General Silas Casey, then a lieutenant colonel and deputy commander of the 9th Infantry Regiment, was reduced to a support role for lower ranked Captain George Pickett who was given independent jurisdiction over a vast area by General William Harney, then a brevet major.

On the other hand, it can be said that Lieutenant Colonel Casey had not been reduced, for he was given command over the U.S.S. Massachusetts and Major Haller to protect and supervise the waters of the Puget Sound. Based on his military experience, he was given discretion to deviate from his orders.

== Pig incident ==
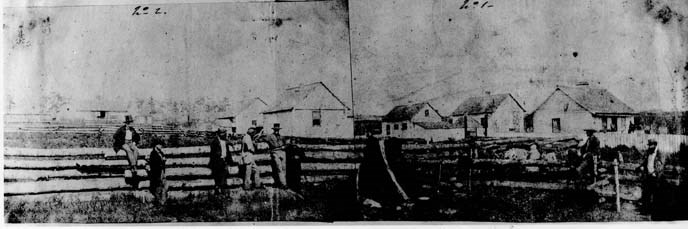
A photograph of Belle Vue Sheep Farm Sep 1859 on San Juan Island circa the Pig War

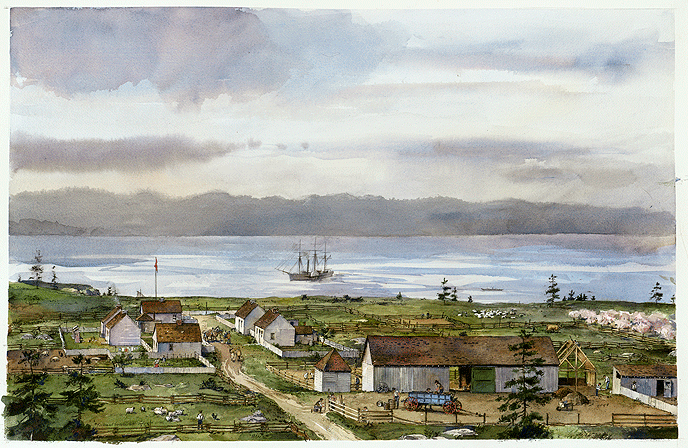
Watercolor of Belle Vue sheep farm San Juan Island at time of Pig War

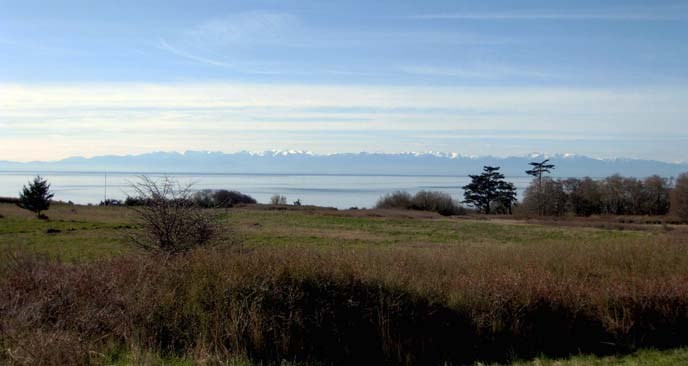
Modern view of Belle Vue sheep farm site and Olympic Mountains in the background

On June 15, 1859, exactly 13 years after the adoption of the Oregon Treaty, the ambiguity led to direct conflict. Lyman Cutlar, an American farmer from Kentucky who had moved onto San Juan Island claiming rights to live there under the Donation Land Claim Act, passed nine years earlier by the U.S. Congress in 1850, found a pig rooting in his garden and eating his tubers. This was not the first occurrence and as a result, Cutlar, tired of the intrusion, shot and killed the pig. It turned out that the pig was owned by an Irishman, Charles Griffin, who was employed by the Hudson's Bay Company to run their sheep ranch on the island. He also owned several pigs that he allowed to roam freely. The two had lived in peace until this incident. Cutlar offered $10 (equivalent to $360 in 2025) to Griffin to compensate for the pig, but Griffin was unsatisfied with this offer and demanded $100 (equivalent to $3,600 in 2025). Following this reply, Cutlar believed he should not have to pay for the pig because the pig had been trespassing on his land. One likely apocryphal account has Cutlar saying to Griffin, "It was eating my potatoes"; and Griffin replying, "It is up to you to keep your potatoes out of my pig." When British authorities threatened to arrest Cutlar, nearby American settlers called for military protection in the Washington Territory from the United States Army.

== Military escalation ==
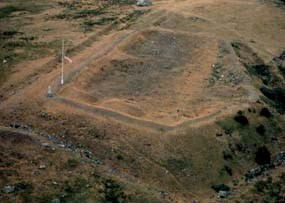
Aerial view of Robert's Redoubt on San Juan Island

US Brigadier General William S. Harney, then commanding the military Department of Oregon, initially dispatched then Captain George Pickett and 66 soldiers of the 9th Infantry Regiment under Pickett's command to San Juan Island with orders to prevent the British from landing; the regiment sailed aboard the wooden-hulled steamer warship USS Massachusetts. Concerned that a squatter population of Americans would begin to occupy San Juan Island if the Americans were not kept in check, the British on Vancouver Island then sent three Royal Navy warships under the command of Captain Geoffrey Hornby to counter the Americans' perceived infringement. Pickett said, "We'll make a Bunker Hill of it". Pickett sited his company and battery near the Hudson's Bay Company's Belle Vue sheep farm near today's Cattle Point Light, and directly under the guns of HMS Satellite, a British warship. When this tactical error was pointed out, Pickett moved his battery of cannon a few miles north to high ground overlooking both Griffin Bay and the Strait of Juan de Fuca, and commenced to build a redoubt for his cannon.

Pickett established the US military camp near the south end of San Juan Island, today one of two historical sites on the island, the other being the British camp, defended by the Royal Marines on the opposite north end of the island. The U.S. camp redoubt was built under the supervision of Second Lieutenant Henry Martyn Robert; Robert went on to write Robert's Rules of Order. Robert's Redoubt of 1859 on the island is considered the best-preserved fortification of its kind now in the United States. (To the east is Jackle's Lagoon, named for George Jackle, a soldier stationed at the American camp.)

The situation continued to escalate. By August 10, 1859, the enlarged detachment of 461 Americans with 14 cannons under Colonel Silas Casey were opposed by a flotilla of five British Royal Navy warships mounting 70 guns and carrying 2,140 men.

The governor of the Colony of Vancouver Island, James Douglas, had ordered Captain Hornby to dislodge the American troops, avoiding armed conflict if possible. At the time, the additional reinforcements sent by Harney had not yet arrived, and the island was occupied by only Pickett's small detachment of 66 men. Hornby refused to take any action until British Rear Admiral Robert L. Baynes, who was in command of the Royal Navy in the Pacific, arrived. When Baynes came and took stock of the situation, he told Douglas that he would not escalate the conflict into a war between two great nations "over a squabble about a pig".

== Resolution ==
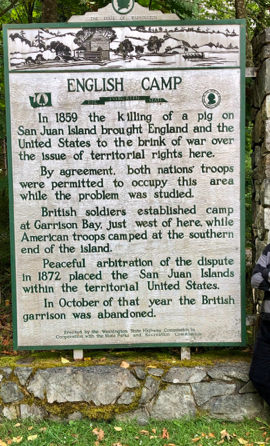
A sign commemorating the Pig War

When news about the crisis reached the far-away capitals of London and Washington, D.C., officials from both nations were shocked at the potential conflict and took action to calm the potentially explosive international incident.

In September, U.S. President James Buchanan sent the U.S. Army's General-in-Chief Winfield Scott to negotiate with Governor Douglas and resolve the growing crisis and prevent it from spinning out of control. This was in the best interest of the United States, as sectionalist tensions within it were rapidly increasing, soon to culminate in the American Civil War. Scott had calmed two other border crises between the two nations in the late 1830s. He arrived in the San Juans in October and began negotiations with Douglas on Vancouver Island.

As a result of the negotiations, both sides agreed to retain joint military occupation of the island until a final diplomatic settlement was reached, reducing their presence to a token force of no more than 100 men. The British camp was established on the north end of San Juan Island along the shoreline, for ease of resupply and access; and the American camp was created on the south end on a high, windswept meadow, suitable for artillery barrages against passing shipping in the strait. Today the Union Jack flag still flies above the former British Royal Marines camp site, being raised and lowered daily by American National Park Service rangers, making it one of the few places without diplomatic status where U.S. federal government employees regularly hoist the flag of another country, though this is only for commemorative historical purposes.

During the following years of joint military occupation, the small British and American units on San Juan Island had an amicable mutual social life, visiting one another's camps to celebrate their respective national holidays and holding various athletic competitions. NPS park rangers tell visitors the biggest threat to peace on the island during the 1850s and 1860s was "the large amounts of alcohol available".

This state of affairs continued for the next 12 years. The dispute was peacefully resolved after the initial skirmish of more than a decade of confrontation and military bluster, during which time local British mainland authorities lobbied London to seize back the islands of the Puget Sound region while the Americans were busy elsewhere with their own civil war. In 1866, the Colony of Vancouver Island was merged with Colony of British Columbia on the mainland to form the enlarged Colony of British Columbia of 1866–1871.

In 1871, the enlarged colony on the West Coast joined the newly-formed dominion of Canada. That year, the United Kingdom and the United States also signed the Treaty of Washington of 1871, which dealt with various remaining minor differences between the two nations, including border issues involving Canada. Among the results of the treaty was the decision to resolve the San Juan Island dispute by international arbitration, with German Emperor Wilhelm I chosen to act as arbitrator. Presenting for the United States in the subsequent San Juan arbitration case was the American historian, diplomat and former U.S. Secretary of the Navy, George Bancroft. Wilhelm I referred the issue to a three-man arbitration commission which met in Geneva for nearly a year. Finally on October 21, 1872, the commission decided in favor of the United States' offer. The arbitrators chose the American-preferred marine boundary via the Haro Strait, to the west of the islands, over the British preference for using the Rosario Strait which lay to their east.

On November 25, 1872, the British withdrew their Royal Marines from the British camp. The Americans followed by July 1874.

The Pig War is commemorated in San Juan Island National Historical Park.

== Key figures ==
- Second Lieutenant Henry Martyn Robert, of South Carolina / Ohio, who later published the first edition of his Robert's Rules of Order in 1876 on democratic parliamentary procedure, and later became a general in the federal Army of the Potomac of the Union Army during the following Civil War was stationed on the island for much of the period.
- Captain George Pickett, of Virginia, and later a general in the Confederate States Army of the infamous Pickett's Charge fame at the pivotal July 1863 Battle of Gettysburg at Gettysburg, Pennsylvania in the following American Civil War, was in charge of the initial American small landing force on San Juan.
- Captain Geoffrey Hornby, commander of the initial British naval force flotilla deployed, was later promoted to Admiral of the Fleet, the highest rank in the Royal Navy, and earned a reputation as a pre-eminent tactician and fleet commander in the 19th century.

== Gallery ==
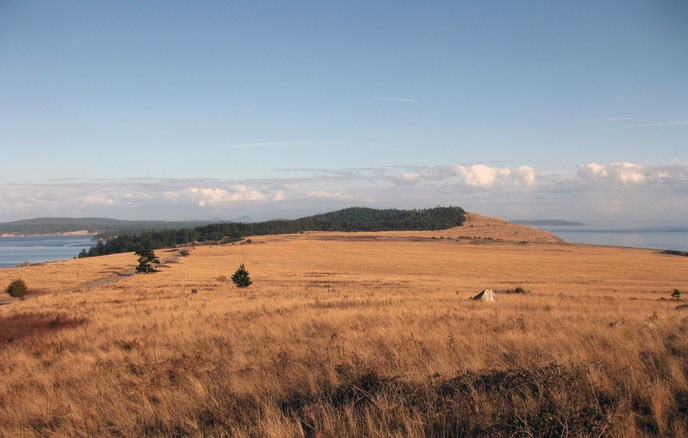
The redoubt had a commanding view of San Juan Island's southern tip and the approaches to the prairie from Griffin bay (left) and the Strait of Juan de Fuca

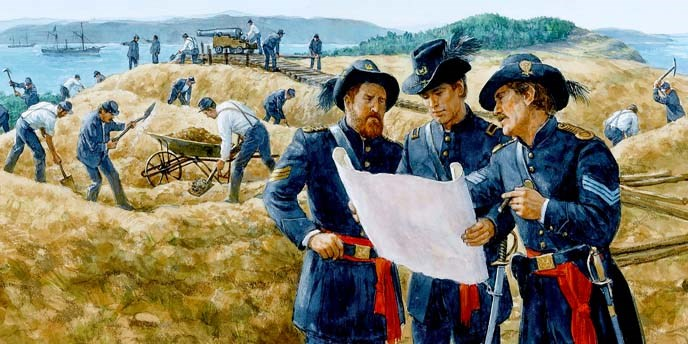
Watercolor of US Army building Roberts Redoubt on San Juan Island

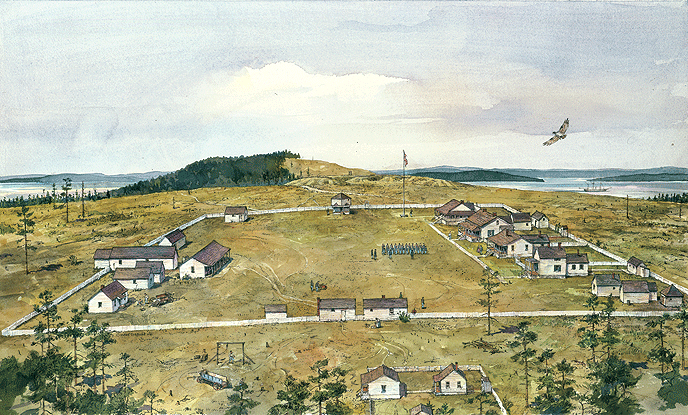
Water color of American camp, San Juan Island

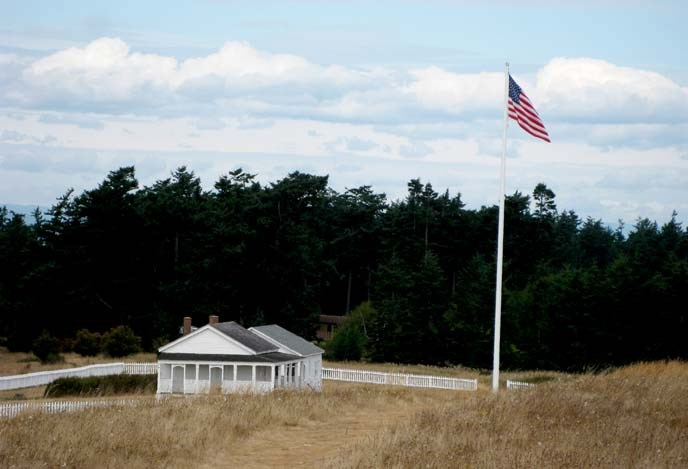
American camp as it exists today

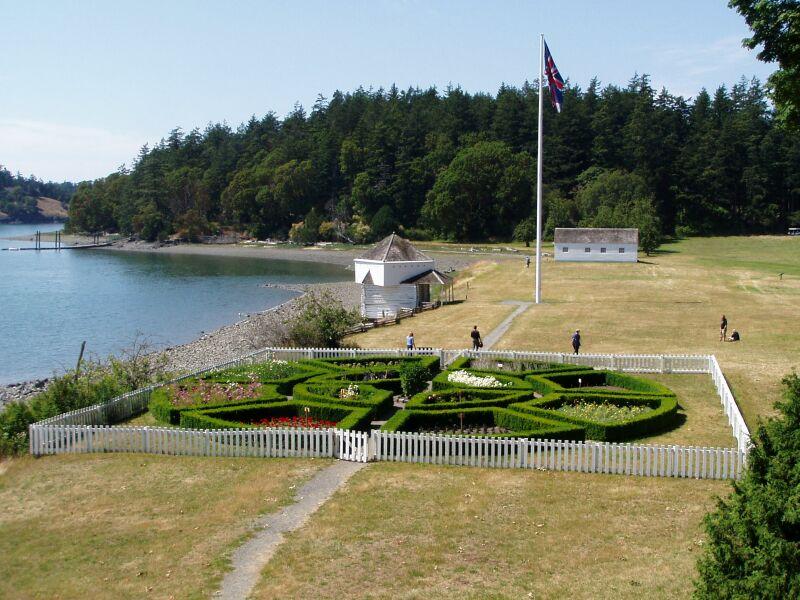
Union Jack at the British camp in San Juan Island National Historical Park

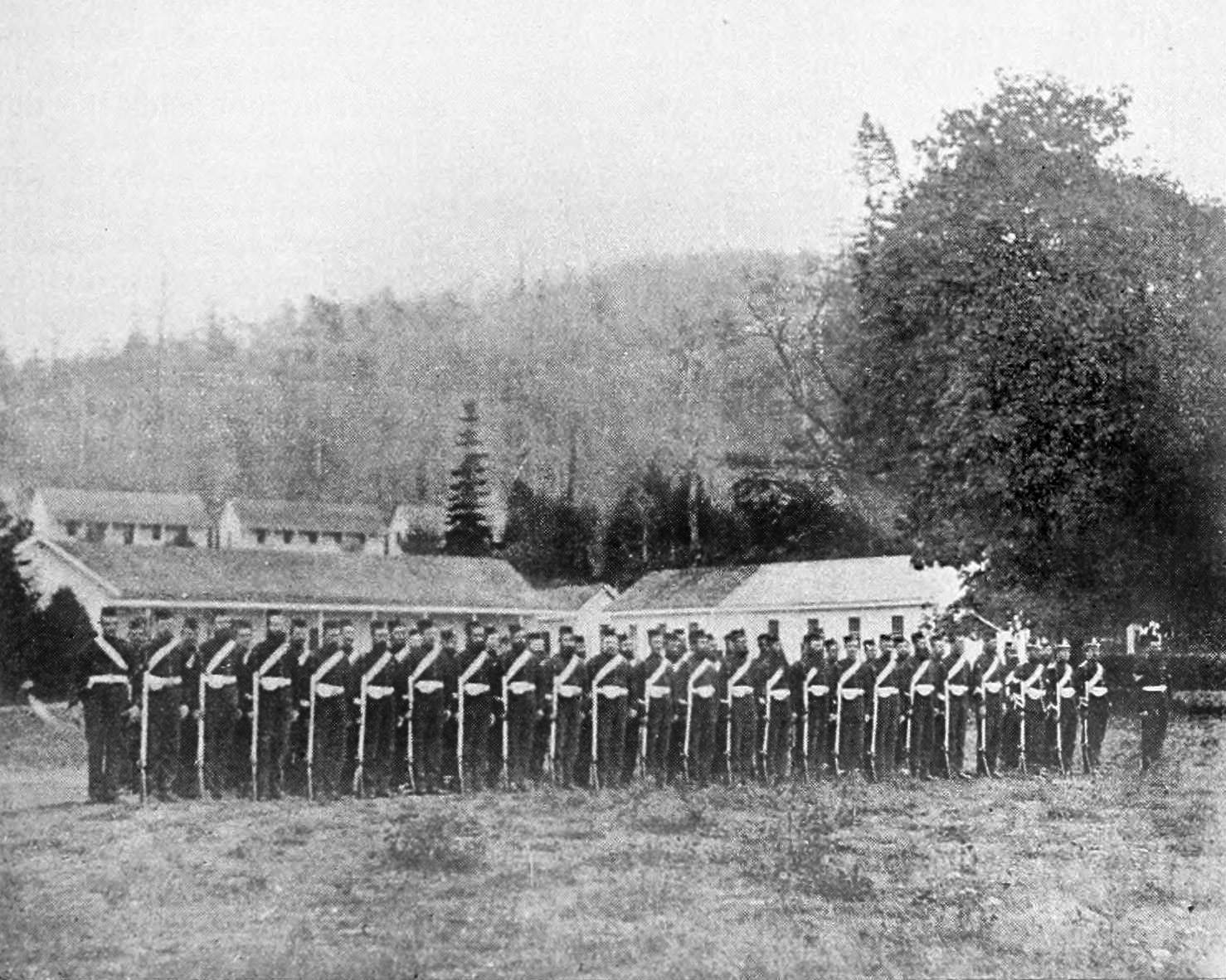
British troops evacuate San Juan Island

== See also ==
- Aroostook War – 1838–1839 border dispute between New Brunswick and Maine
- List of conflicts in the United States
- List of bloodless wars
- Military history of Canada
- Military history of the United Kingdom
- Military history of the United States
- Pastry War – 1838–1839 minor military conflict involving a looted bread shop
- Point Roberts
- The Great Rapprochement – Improving US–UK relations (1895–1915)
- War of the Stray Dog – Minor military conflict between Bulgaria and Greece in October 1925
- War of the Donkey – 13th-century war fought over the ownership of a donkey
