= Castle Island (Washington) =

Island in Washington, United States

Coordinates: 48°25′16″N 122°49′19″W

Castle Island is an island in the San Juan Islands of Washington state in the United States. It is located just off the southern tip of Lopez Island.

The island, having a formidable look, was named Old Hundred Island by the U.S. Coast Survey of 1855. It was given its present, descriptive name, by the British on the British Admiralty chart of 1858–1860.
