= Skipjack Island (Washington) =

Island in the San Juan Islands of Washington, United States

- Location within Washington (state)
- Location: San Juan County, Washington, United States
- Nearest town: Waldron, Washington
- Coordinates: 48°43′56″N 123°02′10″W
- Area: 37 acres (15 ha)
- Elevation: 72 ft (22 m)
- Designation: San Juan Islands National Wildlife Refuge
- Administrator: U.S. Fish and Wildlife Service

Skipjack Island is a 37-acre (15 ha) island in the San Juan Islands in the Salish Sea in the U.S. state of Washington. The island sits about 1 mile north of Waldron Island in the Boundary Pass. British Columbia's Saturna Island lies 3.2 miles to the northwest across the Canadian maritime border. Skipjack Island is uninhabited and protected as part of the San Juan Islands National Wildlife Refuge.
