= Colville Island =

Coordinates: 48°24′54″N 122°49′19″W

Colville Island is an island in the San Juan Islands of the U.S. state of Washington. It lies near Point Colville, on the southeastern tip of Lopez Island.

The island and the point were named for Andrew Colville, the governor of the Hudson's Bay Company, 1852–56.
