= Iceberg Island =

Coordinates: 48°25′38″N 122°53′21.9″W

Iceberg Island is an island in the San Juan Islands of the U.S. state of Washington.

The name comes from the nearby Iceberg Point on Lopez Island. Iceberg Point was named by the U.S. Coast Survey of 1854 because of "remarkable deep and smooth marks of glacial action".
