= Battleship Island (Washington) =

- Interactive map of Battleship Island

Geography
- Location: San Juan County, Washington
- Coordinates: 48°37′26″N 123°10′59″W
- Archipelago: San Juan

Administration
- United States

Battleship Island is a 3-acre (12,000 m^{2}) island just off the northwest tip of Henry Island, in the San Juan Archipelago. The entire island is a Washington State bird sanctuary. The name is derived from the resemblance that the island and its trees have to a ship with masts, particularly when viewed at a distance from the east or west.

It was originally named by the Wilkes Expedition (1838-1842) as Morse Island and appeared as such on nautical charts for decades. In the 1920s, according to the United States Board on Geographic Names, citing a local authority's letter: "Morse Island...presents such a remarkable likeness to a modern battleship in its appearance, that it is locally known by no other name than Battleship Is ... which appears in all the local advertising literature, and is so strikingly appropriate that it is very doubtful if any other name will ever come into common usage." The island was even briefly mistaken by a U.S. warship to be a real British battleship in 1904. Its name officially was changed to Battleship Island around 1930.
