= Brown Island (Washington) =

Island of the San Juan Islands in northwest Washington, United States

- Interactive map of Brown Island

Geography
- Location: Pacific Northwest
- Coordinates: 48.53803°N 123.00370°W
- Archipelago: San Juan Islands
- Area: 0.11 sq mi (0.28 km^{2})

Administration
- United States
- State: Washington
- County: San Juan County

Demographics
- Population: 10 (2008)

Brown Island is a small, private island in Friday Harbor on San Juan Island, San Juan County, Washington, United States. It lies just offshore to the east-northeast of the town of Friday Harbor, Washington. The island has a land area of approximately 70 acres (28 ha) and on January 1, 2008, it had a resident full-time population of 10 people.

Brown Island was named by the Wilkes Expedition in 1841 for the party's navigational instrument repairman, John G. Brown.
