= Flattop Island =

Coordinates: 48°38′49″N 123°04′59″W

Flattop Island is an island in the San Juan Islands of the U.S. state of Washington.

The name was given by Charles Wilkes during the Wilkes Expedition of 1838–1842, describing the island's terrain. During World War II, the island was used for practice bombing, using sacks of flour.
