= Saddlebag Island Marine State Park =

State park in Washington (state), United States

- Location within Washington (state) Location within the United States
- Location: Skagit County, Washington, United States
- Coordinates: 48°32′09″N 122°33′23″W0
- Area: 23.2 acres (9.4 ha)
- Elevation: 49 ft (15 m)
- Established: 1974
- Administrator: Washington State Parks and Recreation Commission
- Website: Official website

Saddlebag Island Marine State Park is a public recreation area made up of 24-acre (9.7 ha) Saddlebag Island, part of the San Juan Islands, in Skagit County, Washington. The island sits in Padilla Bay four miles (6.4 km) northeast of Anacortes, Washington. Dot Island and Huckleberry Island lie nearby. Saddlebag Island was held in private ownership until 1974, when the state purchased it for $192,000 for use as a state park.

== Activities and amenities ==
Park activities include hiking, boating, crabbing, diving, saltwater fishing, swimming, water skiing, bird watching, and wildlife viewing. The island has five primitive campsites, one of which is reserved for human- or wind-powered visitors on the Cascadia Marine Trail. The island has no mooring buoys or docks.
