= Jones Island State Park =

State park in Washington (state), United States

Jones Island Marine State Park
- Location within Washington (state) Location within the United States
- Location: San Juan County, Washington, United States
- Coordinates: 48°36′53″N 123°02′45″W
- Area: 188 acres (76 ha)
- Elevation: 108 ft (33 m)
- Established: 1982
- Administrator: Washington State Parks and Recreation Commission
- Website: Official website

Jones Island State Park is a Washington state park coterminous with Jones Island, one of the San Juan Islands in San Juan County, Washington, United States. It is located one mile (1.6 km) west of the southwestern corner of Orcas Island and accessible only by boat. The island has a land area of 188 acres (76 ha) and no resident population. The island was named by the Wilkes Expedition in 1841 for naval officer Jacob Jones.

== Activities and amenities ==
The park features a dock, four miles of hiking trails, and 24 primitive campsites, two of which are reserved for non-motorized voyagers traveling along the Cascadia Marine Trail. The park's population of black-tail deer have become accustomed to human presence and will allow themselves to be fed by hand; however, this activity is illegal.

== Access to Jones Island ==
Jones Island can be reached by personal watercraft. On the north side, there are two mooring buoys and 128 linear feet of dock moorage at the North Cove. The removal of the moorage dock at North Cove begins in October, and installation begins at the end of March. Mooring buoys are available year-round. On the south side, there are some secure anchorage points, although knowledge of tides, currents and bottom depth should be taken into account.

Kayakers should also be aware of dramatic tidal exchanges, weather conditions, and the possibility that the campsite is booked out by tours.
