= Deadman Island =

Island in Washington, United States

- Location within Washington (state)

Geography
- Location: San Juan County, Washington
- Coordinates: 48°27′29″N 122°56′37″W
- Archipelago: San Juan

Administration
- United States

Deadman Island is one of the San Juan Islands in San Juan County, Washington, United States. The uninhabited, rocky island has a land area of 3.5 acres (1.4 hectares). It is part of the Geese Islets, a collection of rocky islands and reefs near the southwest shore of Lopez Island.

== Conservation ==
Deadman Island is an oystercatcher nesting site and is also a seal haulout. As of 2008 it was being considered a possible location for the reintroduction of the Golden Paintbrush plant.

The island is owned by the Nature Conservancy and public visitation is generally not allowed. It is used as a research site by the Friday Harbor Laboratories.
