= Victim Island =

Coordinates: 48.6137461°N 122.9774448°W

Victim Island is an island in San Juan County the U.S. state of Washington. The island lies just east of the Canadian maritime border between the City of Bellingham and Vancouver Island It is home to the Victim Island State Park.

Evidence of violence amongst local Native Americans caused the name Victim Island to be selected.
