= Fortress Island =

Island of the United States

- Location within Washington (state)

Geography
- Location: San Juan County, Washington
- Coordinates: 48°27′55″N 122°50′19″W
- Archipelago: San Juan

Administration
- United States

Fortress Island is one of the San Juan Islands in San Juan County, Washington, USA. Located in Lopez Sound, the uninhabited, rocky island has a land area of 3.21 acres (1.30 hectares) and is almost completely devoid of vegetation. It is part of the Turtleback complex, a series of intrusive rocks in Lopez Sound formed out of crystallized molten magma that also includes Bird Rock, Low Island, and others.

Fortress Island is part of the San Juan Islands National Wildlife Refuge and is managed by the U.S. Fish and Wildlife Service. As with almost all of the islands in the refuge, human access is prohibited and boats may not approach to within 200 yards (180 m).
