= Blakely Island, Washington =

Island of the San Juan Islands in northwest Washington, United States

Blakely
Native name: XEMXEMIȽĆ
- Location of Blakely Island in the San Juans

- Location within Washington (state)

Geography
- Location: Pacific Northwest
- Coordinates: 48.56025°N 122.80243°W
- Archipelago: San Juan Islands
- Area: 6.507 sq mi (16.85 km^{2})

Administration
- United States
- State: Washington
- County: San Juan County

Demographics
- Population: 56 (2000)

Blakely Island (SENĆOŦEN: XEMXEMIȽĆ) in San Juan County, Washington is the sixth largest island in the San Juan Islands of Washington State, United States, encompassing a land area of 16.852 km^{2} (6.507 sq m). It is separated from Cypress Island to the east by Rosario Strait. The population was 56 persons as of the 2000 census.

There is no immediate public access to Blakely Island and it can only be reached by private ferry or boat.

== History ==
Blakely Island was named by Charles Wilkes during the Wilkes Expedition of 1838-1842, in honor of Johnston Blakeley, a naval commander during the War of 1812. Thatcher bay, on the island's west coast, was the site of seasonal Samish tribal villages and, during the territorial period, the mill town of Thatcher, Washington. In 2014, toxic creosote pilings left over from earlier habitation were removed from the waters of Thatcher bay.

== Infrastructure ==
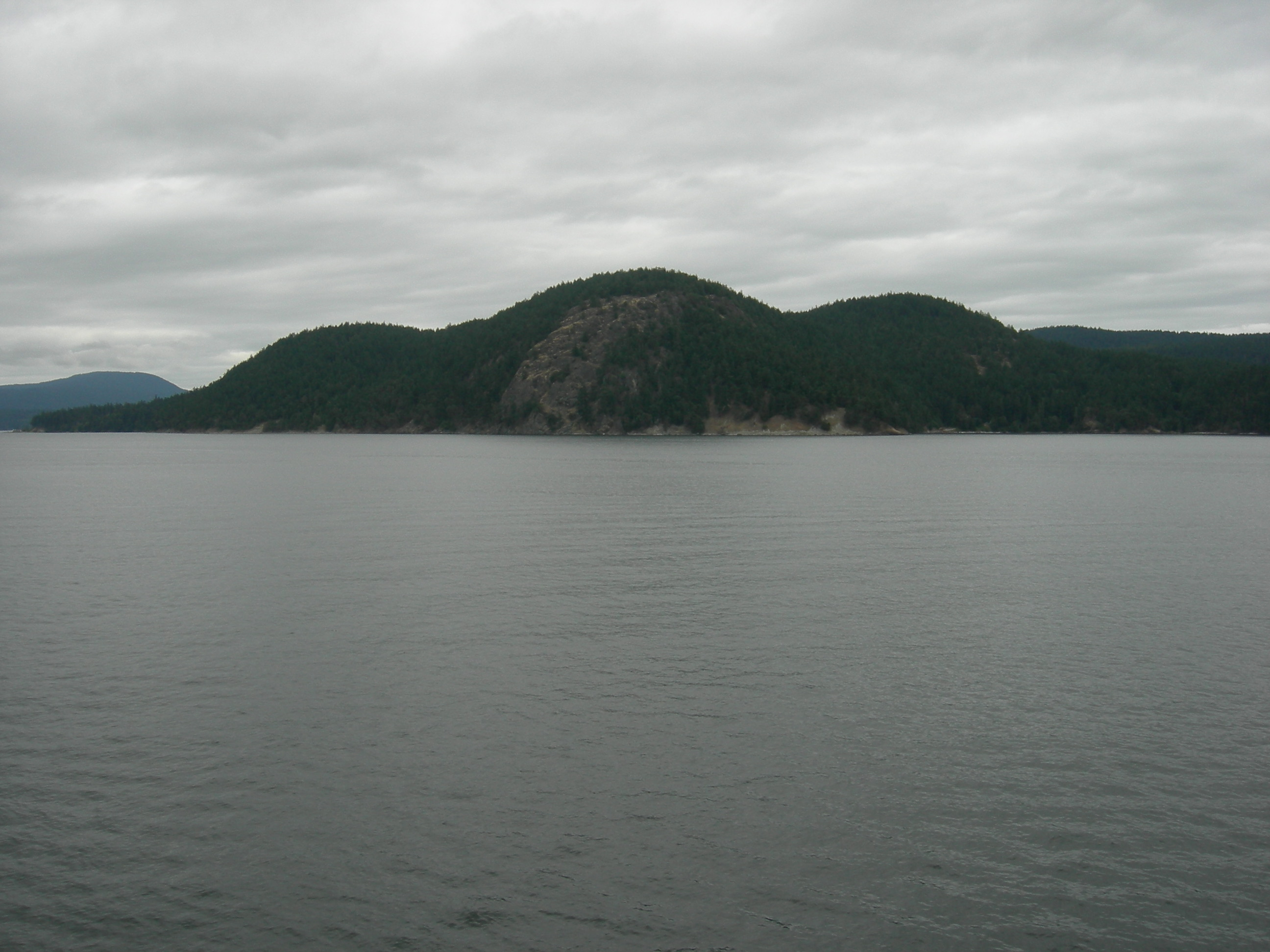
Blakely Island, seen from Washington State Ferry through Thatcher Pass.

There is no public ferry service to Blakely Island. Access is only by boat or private ferry, arriving at the marina at the northern tip of the island. There is also a private airstrip for the exclusive use of property owners. The only services available on Blakely Island are at a general store and café, located at the marina and open seasonally. Seattle Pacific University runs a 967-acre (391.3 ha) biological field station on Blakely Island.

== Geography ==
The island is hilly and heavily forested, with few maintained roads or paths. There are two freshwater lakes, Horseshoe Lake and Spencer Lake, at the center of the island. A freshwater creek, Spencer creek, flows from Spencer Lake into Thatcher Bay.

== Climate ==
Climate data for Blakely Island, Washington
Month	Jan	Feb	Mar	Apr	May	Jun	Jul	Aug	Sep	Oct	Nov	Dec	Year
Record high °F (°C)	65 (18)	69 (21)	79 (26)	83 (28)	90 (32)	95 (35)	101 (38)	95 (35)	88 (31)	82 (28)	69 (21)	74 (23)	101 (38)
Mean daily maximum °F (°C)	45.0 (7.2)	48.6 (9.2)	52.3 (11.3)	57.8 (14.3)	63.6 (17.6)	68.2 (20.1)	72.2 (22.3)	72.2 (22.3)	67.5 (19.7)	59.2 (15.1)	51.0 (10.6)	46.3 (7.9)	58.7 (14.8)
Daily mean °F (°C)	39.8 (4.3)	42.2 (5.7)	45.2 (7.3)	49.7 (9.8)	54.7 (12.6)	58.9 (14.9)	62.0 (16.7)	62.1 (16.7)	58.4 (14.7)	51.9 (11.1)	45.2 (7.3)	41.2 (5.1)	50.9 (10.5)
Mean daily minimum °F (°C)	34.5 (1.4)	36.0 (2.2)	38.1 (3.4)	41.6 (5.3)	45.7 (7.6)	49.6 (9.8)	51.7 (10.9)	51.8 (11.0)	49.4 (9.7)	44.6 (7.0)	39.5 (4.2)	36.0 (2.2)	43.2 (6.2)
Record low °F (°C)	6 (−14)	9 (−13)	18 (−8)	27 (−3)	31 (−1)	33 (1)	35 (2)	33 (1)	19 (−7)	23 (−5)	10 (−12)	4 (−16)	4 (−16)
Average precipitation inches (mm)	3.5 (89)	2.5 (64)	2.3 (58)	1.8 (46)	1.6 (41)	1.4 (36)	0.8 (20)	1.0 (25)	1.5 (38)	2.6 (66)	3.8 (97)	3.8 (97)	26.6 (680)
Average snowfall inches (cm)	2.1 (5.3)	1.1 (2.8)	0.5 (1.3)	0 (0)	0 (0)	0 (0)	0 (0)	0 (0)	0 (0)	0 (0)	0.4 (1.0)	1.0 (2.5)	5.1 (13)
Average precipitation days	17	13	14	11	9	8	4	5	8	12	17	17	135
Source: Weatherbase
