= San Juan Island =

Island in the Salish Sea

- Location of San Juan Island in the San Juans

- Location within Washington (state)

Geography
- Location: Pacific Northwest
- Coordinates: 48°32′N 123°05′W
- Archipelago: San Juan Islands
- Area: 55.053 sq mi (142.59 km^{2})
- Highest elevation: 1,080 ft (329 m)
- Highest point: Mount Dallas

Administration
- United States
- State: Washington
- County: San Juan
- Largest settlement: Friday Harbor (pop. 2,162)

Demographics
- Population: 6,894 (2010)
- Pop. density: 47.84/km^{2} (123.91/sq mi)

San Juan Island is the second-largest and most populous of the San Juan Islands in northwestern Washington, United States. It has a land area of 142.59 km^{2} (55.053 sq mi) and a population of 8,632 as of the 2020 census.

Washington State Ferries serves Friday Harbor, which is San Juan Island's major population center, the San Juan County seat, and the only incorporated town in the islands.

== History ==
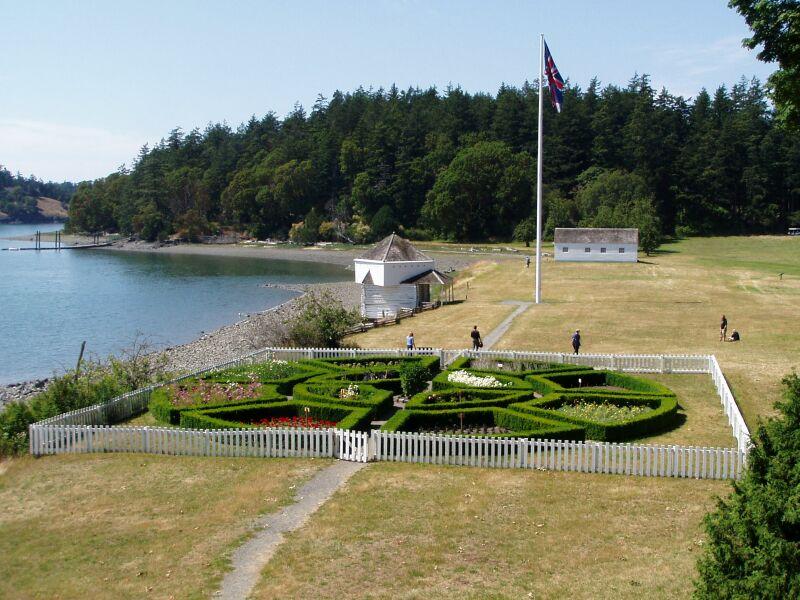
San Juan Island NHP English Camp

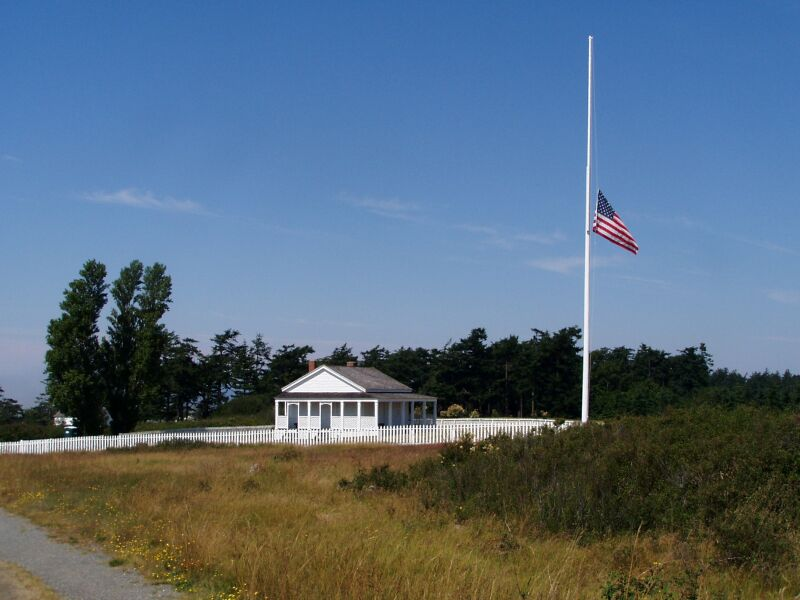
San Juan Island NHP American Camp

The name "San Juan" originates from the 1791 expedition of Francisco de Eliza, who named the archipelago Isla y Archipiélago de San Juan to honor his patron sponsor, Juan Vicente de Güemes Padilla Horcasitas y Aguayo, 2nd Count of Revillagigedo. One of the officers under Eliza's command, Gonzalo López de Haro, was the first European to discover San Juan Island. During the Wilkes Expedition, American explorer Charles Wilkes renamed the island Rodgers Island; the Spanish name remained on British nautical charts and over time became the island's official name.

The island saw seasonal use for salmon fishing. The island was also occupied by Native Americans, many of whom arrived seasonally for fishing. The Hudson's Bay Company (HBC) established the first permanent, non-native settlement on the island on December 13, 1853, in order to create a sheep farm. The Belle Vue Sheep Farm, set up by Chief Factor and Governor of the Colony of Vancouver Island, James Douglas, was intended to assert British sovereignty over the disputed San Juan Islands.

Both the British and Americans asserted control of the island. A small force of American soldiers was sent to the island over concern for this issue and with Native American raids on American settlers. The territorial dispute over this island and the rest of the San Juan Islands heightened when an American settler shot an HBC pig, starting the Pig War in 1859. By November 1859, an agreement was reached for a joint British–American control of the island until the matter was resolved by negotiation. In 1861, the HBC decided to give up the sheep farm due to disruption of HBC sheep by Americans, the subsequent demoralization of HBC employees, and lack of British government support. In 1862, Chief Trader Charles John Griffin left the island and leased the Belle Vue Sheep Farm to Robert Firth, a shepherd, from 1864 to 1873.

The dispute was finally resolved in favor of the Americans in 1872.

The 1862 Pacific Northwest smallpox epidemic swept through the region, killing large numbers of indigenous people. Smallpox Bay, on the west side of San Juan Island, was named for victims of this epidemic.

== Island life ==
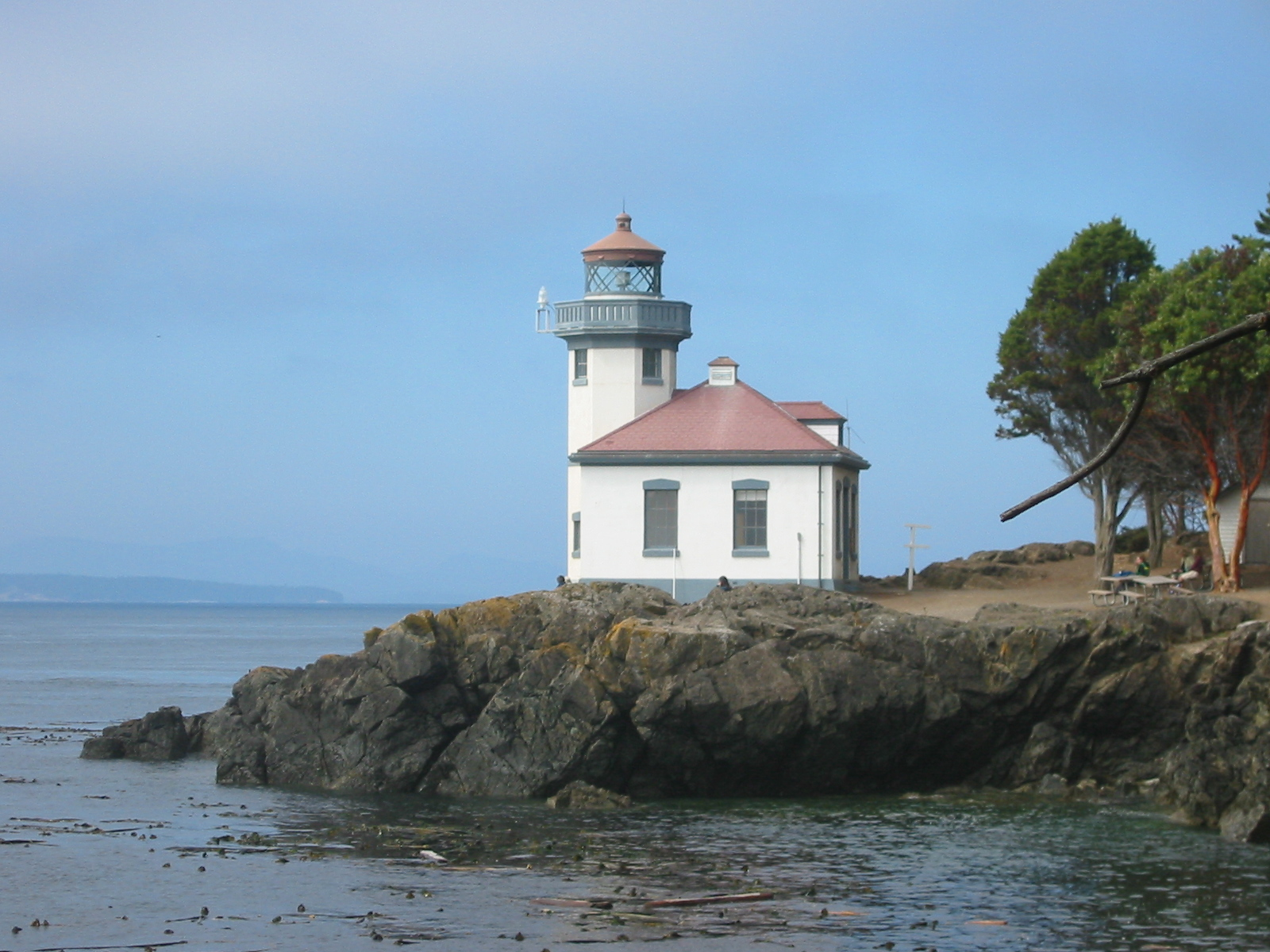
Lime Kiln Lighthouse

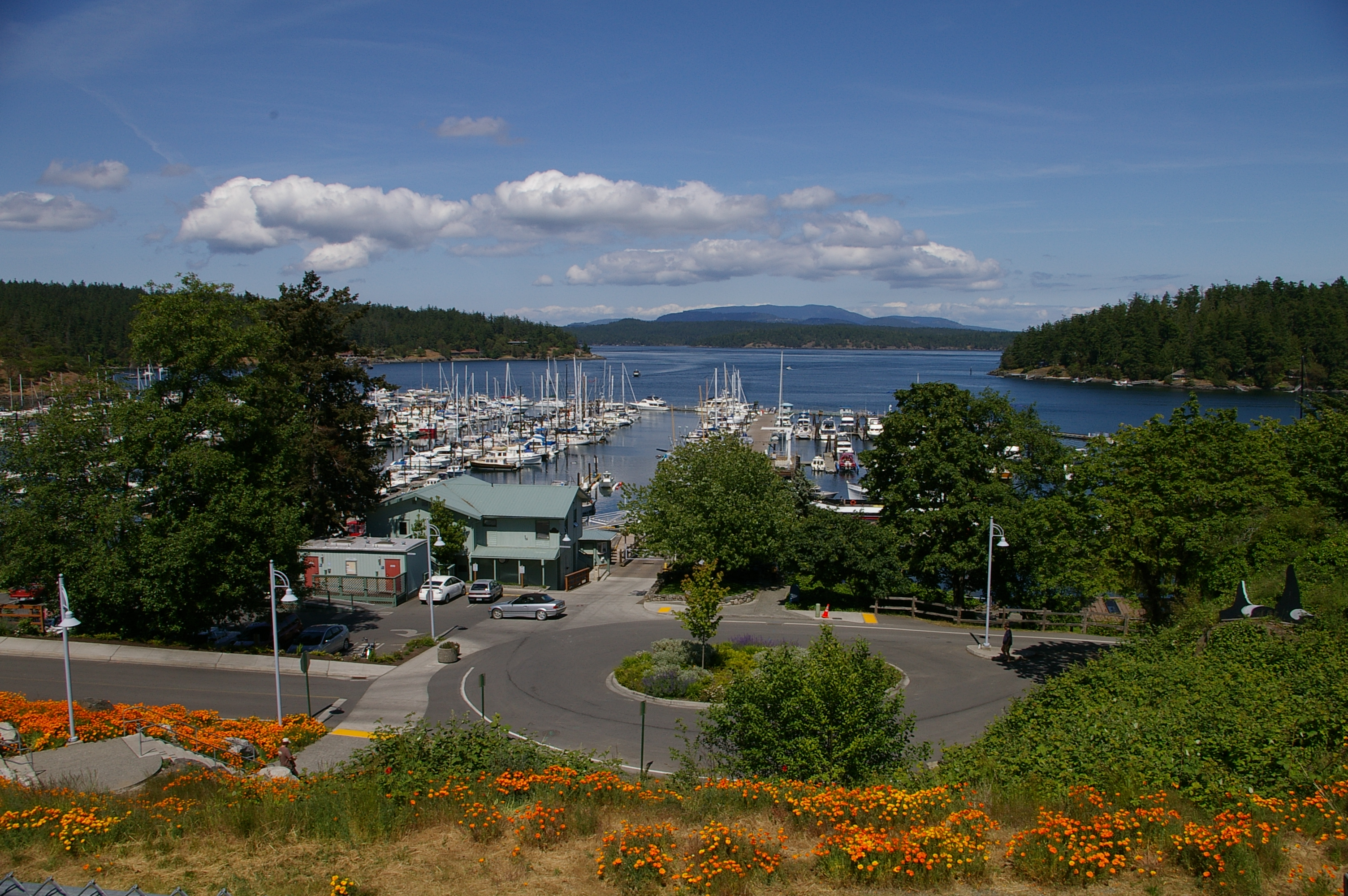
Friday Harbor

San Juan Island is considered a "small town" community, in that it is relatively quiet rural living with few distractions or incidents aside from tourism. One notable resident would be Lisa "Ivory" Moretti, a retired female professional wrestler of World Wrestling Entertainment fame. In addition, many Hollywood stars and celebrities spend time on the island to avoid publicity and to seek some peace and quiet.

=== Historical sites ===
A pair of landmarks, the old English and American Camps, are at opposite ends of the island, which together comprise the San Juan Island National Historical Park, which commemorates the 1859 Pig War. Interpretive centers and reconstructed buildings, formal gardens, etc. recall the history of early European settlement in the area.

=== Infrastructure ===
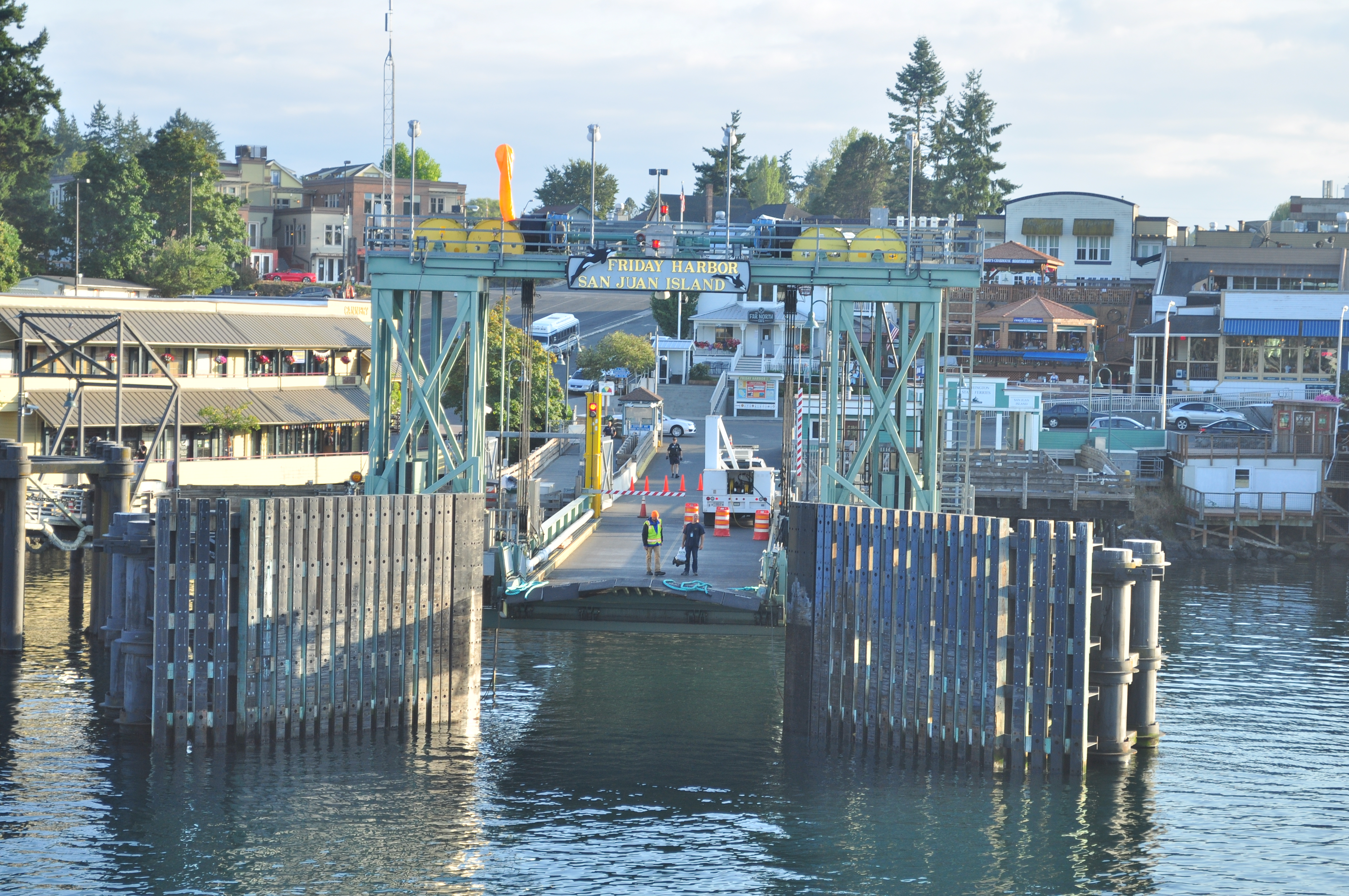
Friday Harbor ferry landing

The Island has a hospital, the Peace Health Peace Island Medical Center.

Transportation to the Island is by boat, Washington State Ferries, seaplane, or by conventional aircraft. If traveling by seaplane, Friday Harbor is serviced by Northwest Seaplanes and Kenmore Air, both longtime operators in the area. The Friday Harbor Airport terminal is 1.3 miles from the Ferry Landing. Outside of Friday Harbor, the only major commercial establishment resort is the village of Roche Harbor, located on the northwest side of the island.

=== Media ===
San Juan Island has a number of weekly newspapers and two online daily news sites: the San Juan Islander and the Island Guardian.

=== Tourism ===
The Island is dotted with numerous farms, and is a tourist-driven economy. The island hosts two substantial marinas, one in Friday Harbor, the other in Roche Harbor. Both count tall ships and large yachts as frequent visitors.

It has several attractions including The Whale Museum; a contemporary Art Museum building completed in 2015; the San Juan Community Theatre; the Sculpture Park (near Roche Harbor); the San Juan Historical Museum; and Lime Kiln Point State Park where visitors can watch orca pods swim by.

== Schools ==
Public schools are operated by the San Juan Island School District #149. It operates four schools: Friday Harbor Elementary School, Friday Harbor Middle School, Friday Harbor High School, Griffin Bay Schools (alternative high school, parent-partner home school program, online courses, and virtual school), and Stuart Island School (K-8). There are also two privately operated schools.

The University of Washington runs Friday Harbor Laboratories, a marine research lab and campus outside Friday Harbor. The campus has been extant since 1909 and has dormitories, a food service, and classrooms for holding lectures.

== Ecology ==
The waters surrounding San Juan Island are home to a variety of species including red sea urchins and pinto abalone. Though no commercial fishing of abalone has ever been allowed in this area, recreational fishing of abalone was outlawed in 1994. The National Marine Fisheries Service listed pinto abalone as a Species of Concern in 2004.

In 2015, San Juan Island became a protected location under The Antiquities Act. On March 25 of that year, then President Barack Obama included San Juan Island and approximately 75 other sites located in the Salish Sea into the San Juan Islands National Monument.

== Parks and recreation ==
Lime Kiln Park is so named because it housed a lime kiln and is home to the historic Lime Kiln Light. Camping is also available around the island.

There are a few small, family-run aquaculture farms in the San Juan Islands including Westcott Bay Shellfish Co, where visitors can buy oysters, clams, and mussels and see shellfish farming operations. Whale watching and night-time bioluminescence tours depart from Friday Harbor.

== Notable people ==
- Lisa Moretti, former professional wrestler
- Singer Jake Shears grew up partly on the island.
