= List of Washington state parks =

Washington State Parks and Recreation Commission

Agency overview
- Formed: 1913; 113 years ago
- Headquarters: 1111 Israel Road S.W., Olympia, Washington
- Annual budget: $148.6 million (2011–13 biennium)
- Website: www.parks.wa.gov

The U.S. state of Washington has over 140 state parks that are managed by the Washington State Parks and Recreation Commission. These include 19 marine parks and 11 Historical Parks. The park system was established in 1913 by the creation of the Washington State Board of Park Commissioners. The first two parks were formed from donated land in 1915, and by 1929 the state had seven parks. In 1947 the State Parks Committee was renamed to the Washington State Parks and Recreation Commission and given authority to oversee the state park system. By 1960 the number of state parks had increased to 130.

In 2003, the Washington State Legislature introduced a $5-a-day parking fee, meant to fund park-related construction projects; more than a quarter of the fees collected went into the fee-collection system itself. Park use decreased more than 15% under the fees. The fee was rescinded in early 2006, returning the state park system to its status of the only system in the West without day-use fees. In 2011 the legislature enacted a $10 day-use permit and a $30 annual pass, called the Discover Pass, for vehicles to enter state parks, lands owned or managed by the Washington Department of Fish and Wildlife, and designated lands of the Washington Department of Natural Resources. A day use pass known as the Check Out Washington pass is also available for check out from participating libraries. Funds generated from the sale of the Discover Pass are deposited into the Recreation Access Pass Account. The new fees did not raise as much money as was hoped, though another effort to encourage donation when renewing certain state licenses (including driver's licenses) was more successful than officials expected.

== Map ==
Washington State Parks (Hover mouse over pog to popup clickable link)

== Current state parks ==
| Name | Image | County | Size | | Details |
| Name | Image | County | acres | ha | Details |
|---|---|---|---|---|---|
| Alta Lake | View of Alta Lake | Okanogan | 181 | 73 | Camping at the north end of 2-mile-long (3.2 km) Alta Lake |
| Anderson Lake | Lake and trees with a danger sign and red tape surrounding it | Jefferson | 476 | 193 | Trails, non-motorized boating, and lake fishing on Quimper Peninsula |
| Battle Ground Lake | Aerial view of Battle Ground Lake State park | Clark | 280 | 110 | Fishing, swimming, camping, and trails in and around an ancient volcano crater |
| Bay View | Padilla Bay as seen from Bayview State Park | Skagit | 25 | 10 | Camping, swimming, and boating on Padilla Bay |
| Beacon Rock | Large rock nearby water | Skamania | 5,100 | 2,100 | Volcanic monolith and forested uplands on the Columbia River |
| Belfair | Beach with tide flats and land in distance | Mason | 65 | 26 | Tidal flats, wetlands, and beaches on Hood Canal |
| Birch Bay | Birch Bay panorama | Whatcom | 194 | 79 | Camping, shellfish harvesting on Birch Bay |
| Bogachiel | Forest with tall soggy trees and a bunch of moss and ferns | Clallam | 123 | 50 | Camping on the Bogachiel River |
| Bottle Beach | Sunset over a beach at low tide with land in the distance | Grays Harbor | 75 | 30 | Tidal flats on the southern shore of Grays Harbor |
| Bridgeport | Geese on lake with barren hill in background | Okanogan | 748 | 303 | Camping, boating on Rufus Woods Lake |
| Bridle Trails | A tree in a forested area | King | 482 | 195 | Suburban equestrian park with 28 miles (45 km) of trails |
| Brooks Memorial | Thinly wooded forest, looking up to the canopy | Klickitat | 700 | 280 | Trails and camping in the southern Cascade Mountains |
| Camano Island | Rocky beach with covered with driftwood | Island | 134 | 54 | Camping and water activities on Puget Sound |
| Cape Disappointment | A lighthouse atop a rocky cliff overlooking water | Pacific | 1,882 | 762 | Formerly called Fort Canby: World War I-era naval gun emplacements and bunkers; camping and water activities near the southern tip of Long Beach Peninsula |
| Centennial Trail | | Spokane | 525 | 212 | 37-mile (60 km) paved trail following the Spokane River from Nine Mile Falls to the Idaho border |
| Columbia Hills | Waterfalls in the distance | Klickitat | 3,338 | 1,351 | Formed from the merger of Horsethief Lake and Dalles Mountain Ranch state parks with hiking trails and Columbia River water activities |
| Columbia Plateau Trail | A rail trail overlooking a stream in a shallow valley | Adams | 3,880 | 1,570 | 130-mile (210 km) abandoned railroad right-of-way running between Cheney and Pasco |
| Conconully | | Okanogan | 81 | 33 | Camping and water activities on Conconully Reservoir |
| Crawford | Flowstone formation | Pend Oreille | 49 | 20 | Seasonal tours of the limestone formations in Gardner Cave |
| Curlew Lake | | Ferry | 123 | 50 | Camping and water activities on Curlew Lake |
| Daroga | Daroga State Park | Douglas | 90 | 36 | Camping and water activities on the Columbia River |
| Dash Point | Beach at low tide with forest in background | King | 398 | 161 | Camping, trails, and water activities on Puget Sound |
| Deception Pass | A green bridge spanning some water | Island | 4,134 | 1,673 | Camping, water activities, and old-growth forest at the northern end of Whidbey Island |
| Dosewallips | Tidal shoreline decorated with spruce trees | Jefferson | 425 | 172 | Camping and water activities on Hood Canal |
| Doug's Beach | | Klickitat | 400 | 160 | Windsurfing in the Columbia Gorge |
| Fort Columbia | Historic building on a slight hill | Pacific | 593 | 240 | Early 20th-century coastal artillery and historic wood-frame fort buildings |
| Fort Ebey | Seascape | Island | 645 | 261 | Camping, paragliding, and trails on the Strait of Juan de Fuca |
| Federation Forest | Tall evergreen trees in an old-growth forest | King | 619 | 251 | Hiking amid old-growth Douglas firs on the White River |
| Fields Spring | Hills in the distance as viewed from highground | Asotin | 792 | 321 | Trails in the Blue Mountains region |
| Flaming Geyser | A small flame coming from a cylindrical concrete slab surrounded by rocks | King | 480 | 190 | Flaming methane geysers (seeps); rafting on the Green River |
| Forks of the Sky | | King | 1,300 | 530 | |
| Ginkgo Petrified Forest | Petrified wood below park signage | Kittitas | 7,470 | 3,020 | A petrified forest with more than 50 species of wood; camping and water activities on the Columbia River's Wanapum Reservoir |
| Grayland Beach | Sandy beach with sunbeams peeking through overcast sky | Pacific | 412 | 167 | Saltwater beach activities on the Pacific Ocean |
| Griffiths-Priday | Grassy field with shrubs and distant trees | Grays Harbor | 364 | 147 | Saltwater beach activities on the Pacific Ocean |
| Harstine Island | | Mason | 471 | 191 | Beach access |
| Ike Kinswa | River flowing through valley surrounded by forested mountains | Lewis | 454 | 184 | Water activities on Lake Mayfield |
| Illahee | Small beach as seen through a higher vantage point obscured by trees | Kitsap | 75 | 30 | Saltwater beach activities on Puget Sound |
| Iron Horse | Cross country skiers on a snow covered path between trees | Kittitas, King | 1,612 | 652 | Rail trail over Snoqualmie Pass |
| Jarrell Cove | Sailboat with forested shore in background | Mason | 43 | 17 | Saltwater activities on south Puget Sound |
| Joemma Beach | Sun peeking through tall old-growth trees | Pierce | 122 | 49 | Saltwater activities on south Puget Sound |
| Joseph Whidbey | Looking down grassy hillside towards beach on cloudy day | Island | 112 | 45 | Saltwater beach activities on the Strait of Juan de Fuca |
| Kanaskat-Palmer | Rapids of the Green River near pebble beaches | King | 320 | 130 | Whitewater rafting in the Green River Gorge |
| Kinney Point | | Jefferson | 76 | 31 | Saltwater beach activities on south Puget Sound |
| Kitsap Memorial | Hood Canal with mountains in background | Kitsap | 58 | 23 | Saltwater beach activities on south Hood Canal |
| Kopachuck | Kopachuck State Park beach | Pierce | 109 | 44 | Saltwater beach activities on south Puget Sound |
| Lake Chelan | View of Lake Chelan with barren hills in background | Chelan | 127 | 51 | Camping, water activities on Lake Chelan |
| Lake Easton | Lake Easton with a distant beach on the opposite side | Kittitas | 516 | 209 | Camping, water activities on Lake Easton |
| Lake Isabella | | Mason | 188 | 76 | |
| Lake Sammamish | Picnic tables on a grassy field near a large lake | King | 512 | 207 | |
| Lake Sylvia | Small stream in a forest flowing below an old wooden dam | Grays Harbor | 252 | 102 | |
| Lake Wenatchee | A lake as it encounters foothills covered in trees | Chelan | 489 | 198 | |
| Larrabee | A steep rocky coastline covered in trees | Whatcom | 2,683 | 1,086 | |
| Leadbetter Point | | Pacific | 1,698 | 687 | |
| Lewis and Clark | Informational sign by a large Douglar Fir tree | Lewis | 621 | 251 | |
| Lewis and Clark Trail | | Columbia | 37 | 15 | |
| Lime Kiln Point | A small lighthouse on a rocky near a rocky coastline | San Juan | 36 | 15 | A facility for orca whale research |
| Lincoln Rock | Steep rocky cliff and sandy hillside rising from a lake | Douglas | 80 | 32 | |
| Lyons Ferry | | Franklin | 1,000 | 400 | Returned to Washington State Parks operation in 2015 |
| Loomis Lake | | Pacific | 385 | 156 | |
| Manchester | | Kitsap | 111 | 45 | |
| Maryhill | | Klickitat | 99 | 40 | |
| Millersylvania | Calm lake with trees on the opposite side in the distance | Thurston | 842 | 341 | |
| Moran | A small pier into Mountain Lake | San Juan | 5,000 | 2,000 | |
| Mount Pilchuck | A small structure on a rocky summit | Snohomish | 1,893 | 766 | |
| Mount Spokane | A wooded mountain in the distance | Spokane | 13,919 | 5,633 | |
| Mystery Bay | | Jefferson | 10 | 4.0 | |
| Nolte | Small lake surrounded by forest | King | 117 | 47 | |
| Obstruction Pass | Gravelly beach with islands in the distance | San Juan | 76 | 31 | |
| Ocean City | Low tide beach under overcast sky with tiny silhouettes of people in the distance | Grays Harbor | 170 | 69 | |
| Olallie | Snoqualmie River flowing through a heavily wooded area | King | 2,338 | 946 | |
| Packwood State Park (Skate Creek Nature Park) | | Lewis | 175 | 71 | Part of a land swap in the 1990s, the parcel has remained undeveloped. Attempts have been made to transfer the land to the county. |
| Pacific Beach | Stagnant stream of water surrounded by flat grassland near the beach | Grays Harbor | 10 | 4.0 | |
| Pacific Pines | A small trail through a field with high grass and small shrubs | Pacific | 10 | 4.0 | |
| Palouse Falls | A waterfall surrounded by rocky cliffs with a rainbow visible above the water | Franklin, Whitman | 105 | 42 | |
| Paradise Point | A small sandy river beach with concrete bridges overhead | Clark | 88 | 36 | |
| Pearrygin Lake | Green rolling hills under an overcast sky with some breaks in the clouds | Okanogan | 696 | 282 | |
| Penrose Point | Motorboat at a dock with a forest on the shore | Pierce | 152 | 62 | |
| Peshastin Pinnacles | Pointed rock formations with a few small shrubs | Chelan | 34 | 14 | |
| Pleasant Harbor | | Jefferson | 425 | 172 | |
| Potholes | Aerial view of a large reservoire surrounded by fields | Grant | 640 | 260 | |
| Potlatch | | Mason | 125 | 51 | |
| Rainbow Falls | Small waterfall passing between boulders in front of some trees | Lewis | 139 | 56 | |
| Rasar | Sandy bank of a wide river with a strand of trees and a hillside on the other side | Skagit | 169 | 68 | |
| Reed Island | | Clark | 510 | 210 | |
| Riverside | A stream of water in front curving around some large boulders | Spokane | 10,885 | 4,405 | |
| Rockport | Densely populated greenery in a forest | Skagit | 670 | 270 | |
| Saint Edward | A dense forest with shrubs | King | 316 | 128 | |
| Saltwater | Picnic tables on a lawn surrounded by a steep rocky beach | King | 87.4 | 35.4 | |
| Scenic Beach | Distant blue mountains separated from viewer by a large body of water | Kitsap | 88 | 36 | |
| Schafer | River flowing between a mix of coniferous trees and leafless shrubs | Mason | 119 | 48 | |
| Seaquest | Seaquest State Park | Cowlitz | 475 | 192 | |
| Sequim Bay | | Clallam | 92 | 37 | |
| Shine Tidelands | Driftwood-laden shoreline with forested piece of steep-cliffed land in the distance | Jefferson | 13 | 5.3 | |
| South Whidbey | A black and white image of a large cedar looking up from the ground | Island | 347 | 140 | |
| Spencer Spit | Driftwood on a beach with some small watercraft in the nearby water | San Juan | 138 | 56 | |
| Spring Creek Hatchery | Windsurfers on the river with a forested hillside in the background | Skamania | 9.6 | 3.9 | |
| Squak Mountain | View from the top of a tall hill overlooking more hills | King | 1,545 | 625 | |
| Squilchuck | Dirt trail with bike tracks and a forest and hill in the background | Chelan | 228 | 92 | |
| Steamboat Rock | Large plateau separated from the viewer by some water | Grant | 3,522 | 1,425 | |
| Stretch Point | | Mason | 8 | 3.2 | |
| Sun Lakes-Dry Falls | High point view of a body of water surrounded by steep cliffs | Grant | 4,027 | 1,630 | |
| Tilton River State Park | | Lewis | 110 | 45 | The land was donated by a retired logger in the 1990s. The parcel has remained undeveloped as the state found the park inconsistent with the overall plans within the parks system. The grounds are open only for hiking and day use activities. |
| Tolmie | Mud flats of the Puget Sound through foliage. | Thurston | 105 | 42 | |
| Triton Cove | Shoreline covered in a mix of grass, trees, and shrubs | Jefferson | 29 | 12 | |
| Twanoh | Picnic tables, empty parking lot, grass fields, and a lone tree with the water in the background | Mason | 182 | 74 | |
| Twenty-Five Mile Creek | Creek in a forest with some burnt stumps visible | Chelan | 235 | 95 | |
| Twin Harbors | Ocean with breaking waves under a dark and stormy sky | Grays Harbor | 172 | 70 | |
| Wallace Falls | A large waterfall flowing between green forests | Snohomish | 4,735 | 1,916 | |
| Wenatchee Confluence | | Chelan | 197 | 80 | |
| Westhaven | | Grays Harbor | 79 | 32 | |
| Westport Light | | Grays | 212 | 86 | |
| Willapa Hills | | Lewis County and Pacific County | 757 | 306 | Park consists of a 56-mile (90 km) rail trail that is partially paved with stretches of compact gravel |
| Yakima Sportsman | Shrubs and trees next to a river with brown hills in background | Yakima | 247 | 100 | |

== Marine state parks ==
| Name | Image | County | Size | | Water body | Details |
| Name | Image | County | acres | ha | Water body | Details |
|---|---|---|---|---|---|---|
| Blake Island Marine State Park | Blake Island surrounded by water | Kitsap | 475 | 192 | Puget Sound | Island park in Puget Sound; home of Tillicum Village |
| Blind Island Marine State Park | Picnic table and trees on Blind Island | San Juan | 3 | 1.2 | Blind Bay | Part of the Cascadia Marine Trail |
| Clark Island Marine State Park | Aerial view of small forested island | San Juan | 55 | 22 | Strait of Georgia | Marine camping on the Strait of Georgia in the San Juan Islands |
| Cutts Island Marine State Park | Small butte-shaped island topped with trees | Pierce | 2 | 0.81 | Carr Inlet | Island park in Carr Inlet at the southern end of Puget Sound |
| Doe Island Marine State Park | | San Juan | 7 | 2.8 | Rosario Strait | Island park southeast of Orcas Island |
| Eagle Island Marine State Park | | Pierce | 10 | 4.0 | Balch Passage | Island park in southern Puget Sound |
| Hope Island Marine State Park - Mason County | | Mason | 106 | 43 | Squaxin Passage | Old-growth forest, salt marsh, beach on Puget Sound |
| Hope Island Marine State Park - Skagit County | | Skagit | 200 | 81 | Skagit Bay | Island camping on Skagit Bay |
| James Island Marine State Park | | San Juan | 117 | 47 | Rosario Strait | Island camping in the San Juan Islands |
| Jones Island Marine State Park | | San Juan | 190 | 77 | San Juan Channel | Island camping in the San Juan Islands |
| Matia Island Marine State Park | | San Juan | 145 | 59 | Strait of Georgia | |
| McMicken Island Marine State Park | | Mason | 11.5 | 4.7 | South Puget Sound | |
| Patos Island Marine State Park | A lighthouse in the distance on the Patos Island | San Juan | 207 | 84 | Strait of Georgia | |
| Posey Island Marine State Park | Barbecue pit surrounded by dry grass and shrubs with the sound in the background | San Juan | 1 | 0.40 | Haro Strait | |
| Saddlebag Island Marine State Park | | San Juan | 24 | 9.7 | Padilla Bay | |
| Skagit Island Marine State Park | | Skagit | 24 | 9.7 | Skagit Bay | |
| Skull Island | | San Juan | 3.2 | 1.3 | Massacre Bay | |
| Stuart Island Marine State Park | Aerial view of low forested islands | San Juan | 85 | 34 | Boundary Pass, Haro Strait | |
| Sucia Island Marine State Park | Sail boats anchored off a beach covered with driftwood | San Juan | 814 | 329 | Strait of Georgia | |
| Turn Island Marine State Park | | San Juan | 35 | 14 | San Juan Channel | Part of San Juan Islands National Wildlife Refuge |

== Historical and heritage site state parks ==
| Name | Image | County | Size | | Details |
| Name | Image | County | acres | ha | Details |
|---|---|---|---|---|---|
| Cama Beach Historical State Park | Little pink houses | Island | 433 | 175 | Preserved 1930s seaside tourist camp |
| Fort Casey Historical State Park | A canon in an embarkment overlooking water | Island | 467 | 189 | World War I-era naval gun emplacements and bunkers |
| Fort Flagler Historical State Park | Deer grazing on grass in front of historic buildings | Jefferson | 784 | 317 | World War I-era naval gun emplacements and bunkers at the mouth of Puget Sound |
| Fort Simcoe Historical State Park | Wooden structure surrounded by yellow grassland | Yakima | 200 | 81 | 1850s-era military installation on the Yakama Indian Reservation with army and Native American interpretive displays |
| Fort Townsend Historical State Park | Abandoned brick structure surrounded by forest | Jefferson | 367 | 149 | Boating, camping, and trails at the northeastern extreme of the Olympic Peninsula |
| Fort Worden Historical State Park | Historic buildings behind a flag pole | Jefferson | 434 | 176 | Camping, water activities, and the Coast Artillery Museum |
| Goldendale Observatory State Park Heritage Site | Skyline of observatories | Klickitat | 5 | 2.0 | An astronomical observatory |
| Jackson House State Park Heritage Site | Restored Jackson House | Lewis County | 1.4 | 0.57 | Restored 1850 cabin and homestead site of early Euro-American settlers John R. and Matilda Jackson |
| Matilda N. Jackson State Park Heritage Site | | Lewis | 5 | 2.0 | Heritage site of early pioneer homesteader; picnic amenities and small loop trail |
| Olmstead Place Historical State Park | Small red cottage surrounded by garden | Kittitas | 217 | 88 | |
| Palouse Falls State Park Heritage Site | A waterfall surrounded by rocky cliffs with a rainbow visible above the water | Franklin, Whitman | 105 | 42 | |
| Peace Arch Historical State Park | A white stone arch in a grassy lawn in front of a line of automobiles | Whatcom | 20 | 8.1 | A peace memorial on the United States-Canada border |
| Sacajawea Historical State Park | A museum building surrounded by trees | Franklin | 284 | 115 | |
| Steptoe Battlefield State Park Heritage Site | White stone obelisk surrounded by grass and a black fence | Whitman | 4 | 1.6 | |
| Steptoe Butte State Park Heritage Site | Small paved road approaching a hill surrounded by fields | Whitman | 150 | 61 | |
| Willie Keil's Grave State Park Heritage Site | | Pacific | 0.34 | 0.14 | Site is accessible to users of the Willapa Hills Trail |

== Former state parks ==
| Name | County | Area | | Image | Remarks |
| Name | County | acres | ha | Image | Remarks |
|---|---|---|---|---|---|
| Central Ferry Park | Whitman | 185 | 75 | | Administered by USACE; formerly Central Ferry State Park (?–2002) |
| Chief Timothy Park | Asotin | 198 | 80 | | Administered by USACE; formerly Chief Timothy State Park (?–2002) |
| Crow Butte Park | Benton | 275 | 111 | | Administered by Port of Benton; formerly Crow Butte State Park (?–2002) |
| Damon Point | Grays Harbor | 61 | 25 | | Administered by Washington Recreation and Conservation Office |
| Fay Bainbridge Park | Kitsap | 17 | 6.9 | | Administered by Bainbridge Island Metro Park & Recreation District |
| Fort Okanogan | Okanogan | 45 | 18 | | Administered by Confederated Tribes of the Colville Reservation |
| Fort Ward Park | Kitsap | 137 | 55 | | Administered by Bainbridge Island Metro Park & Recreation District |
| Griffin Bay | San Juan | 15 | 6.1 | | |
| Hanging Gardens | King | 434 | 176 | | Now Hanging Gardens Site within the Green River Gorge Conservation Area |
| Mukilteo Lighthouse Park | Snohomish | 12 | 4.9 | | Formerly Mukilteo State Park, deeded to City of Mukilteo in 2004 |
| Osoyoos Lake | Okanogan | 47 | 19 | | Now Osoyoos Lake Veteran's Memorial Park, operated by city of Oroville |
| Square Lake | Kitsap | 231 | 93.5 | | Transferred to Kitsap County in 2020 and merged into Coulter Creek Heritage Park |
| Upright Channel | San Juan | 20 | 8.1 | | |
| Wenberg County Park | Snohomish | 46 | 19 | | Formerly Wenberg State Park; transferred to Snohomish County in 2009 |
| West Hylebos Wetlands Park | King | 120 | 49 | | |
| Westhaven | Grays Harbor | 79 | 32 | | Subsumed into the expanded Westport Light State Park in 2016. |

== See also ==
- List of national parks of the United States
- List of marine protected areas of Washington
