= Key Peninsula =

Peninsula in the U.S. state of Washington

Coordinates: 47°17′29″N 122°46′31″W

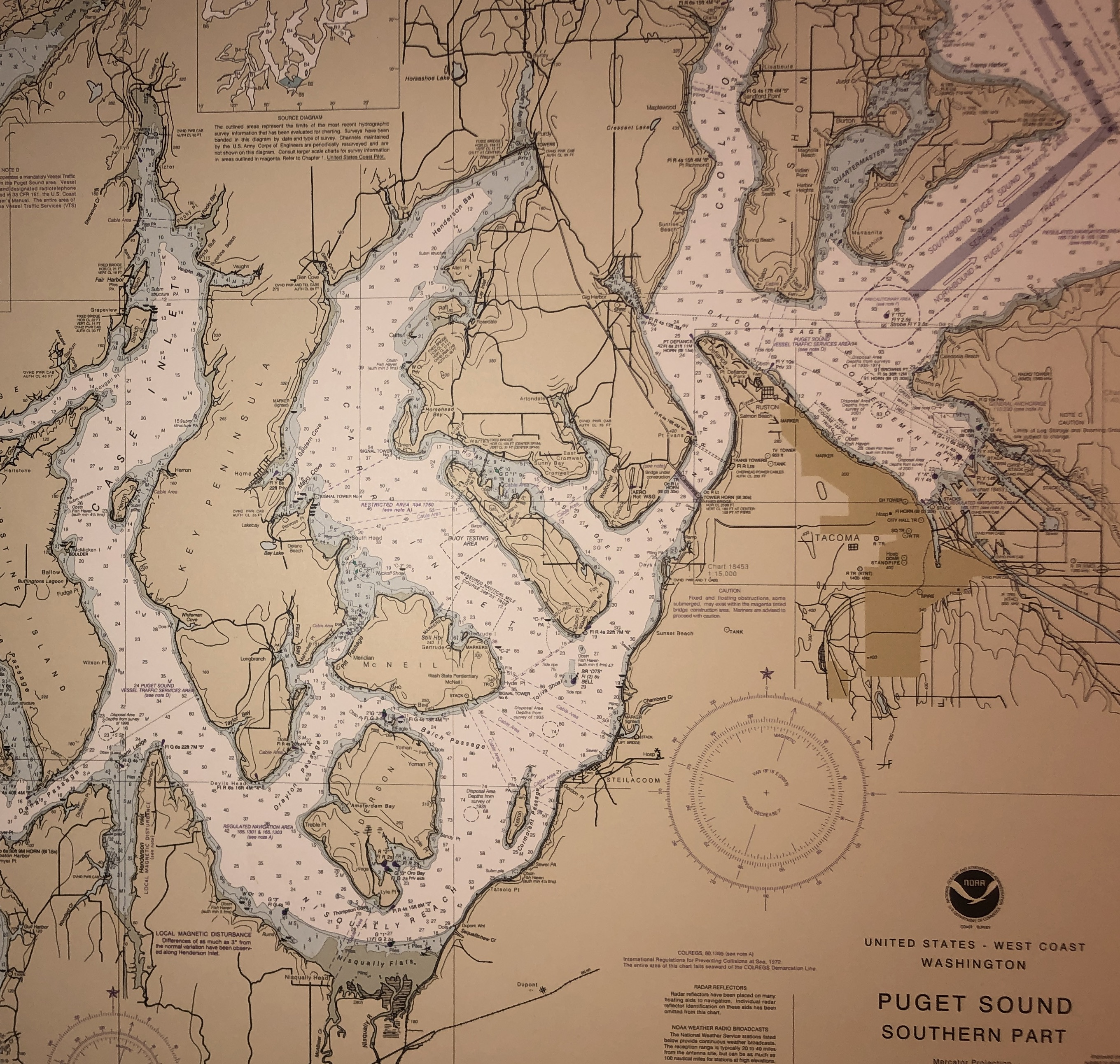
The Key Peninsula lies at the heart of South Puget Sound.

The Key Peninsula lies along Puget Sound to the south of Kitsap Peninsula in the U.S. state of Washington. It is part of Pierce County and is bordered to the west by Case Inlet and to the east by Carr Inlet. The peninsula is approximately 16 miles (26 km) long and has two Washington State Parks.

== History ==
The Key Peninsula was originally home to several Native American tribes, including the Squaxin Island and Nisqually. Non-indigenous settlers first migrated into the peninsula in the 1830s, which was named Longbranch Peninsula by the United States Exploring Expedition in 1841. In the 1930s, due to the key-shape of the peninsula, it was officially renamed "Key Peninsula".

In the late 19th century, the Key Peninsula attracted more homesteaders and settlers. It later evolved into a rural residential community.

== Geography ==
=== Communities ===
There are no incorporated cities on Key Peninsula. Communities on the peninsula include Glen Cove, Herron, Home, Key Center, Lakebay, Longbranch, Minter, and Vaughn.

=== Hydrology ===
The Key Peninsula extends into Puget Sound, a large inlet of the Pacific Ocean. The peninsula also has several creeks and streams that drain 19 square miles (49 km^{2}) into Puget Sound.

=== Parks ===
The Key Peninsula is home to two state parks: Penrose Point State Park and Joemma Beach State Park. Penrose Point State Park is a 237-acre park, well-known for its camping and shellfishing culture. Joemma Beach State Park also features a marine camping park.

== Demographics ==
The population of the Key Peninsula was projected to grow from 11,016 in 1990 to 16,369 in 2022; however, this number was surpassed by the year 2015. The total population in the Key Peninsula is estimated to be 20,000 people.

== Education ==
The Key Peninsula is served by the Peninsula School District, which has several elementary schools and a single middle school on the peninsula. High school students in the area attend Peninsula High School in Purdy or Gig Harbor High School in Gig Harbor.
