= Griffin Bay State Park =

Natural landmark in State of Washington

Coordinates: 48.502321°N 122.996567°W

Griffin Bay State Park in San Juan County, Washington was a marine park with two campsites in the Washington State Parks. It consisted of 15 acres (6.1 ha) with 340 feet (100 m) of saltwater shoreline. It was part of the Cascadia Marine Trail and campsites were restricted to visitors arriving by human- and wind-powered watercraft. Though the state parks department still owned the land as of August, 2014, the park is no longer listed on the state parks website.
