= Blind Island Marine State Park =

Park in the U.S. state of Washington

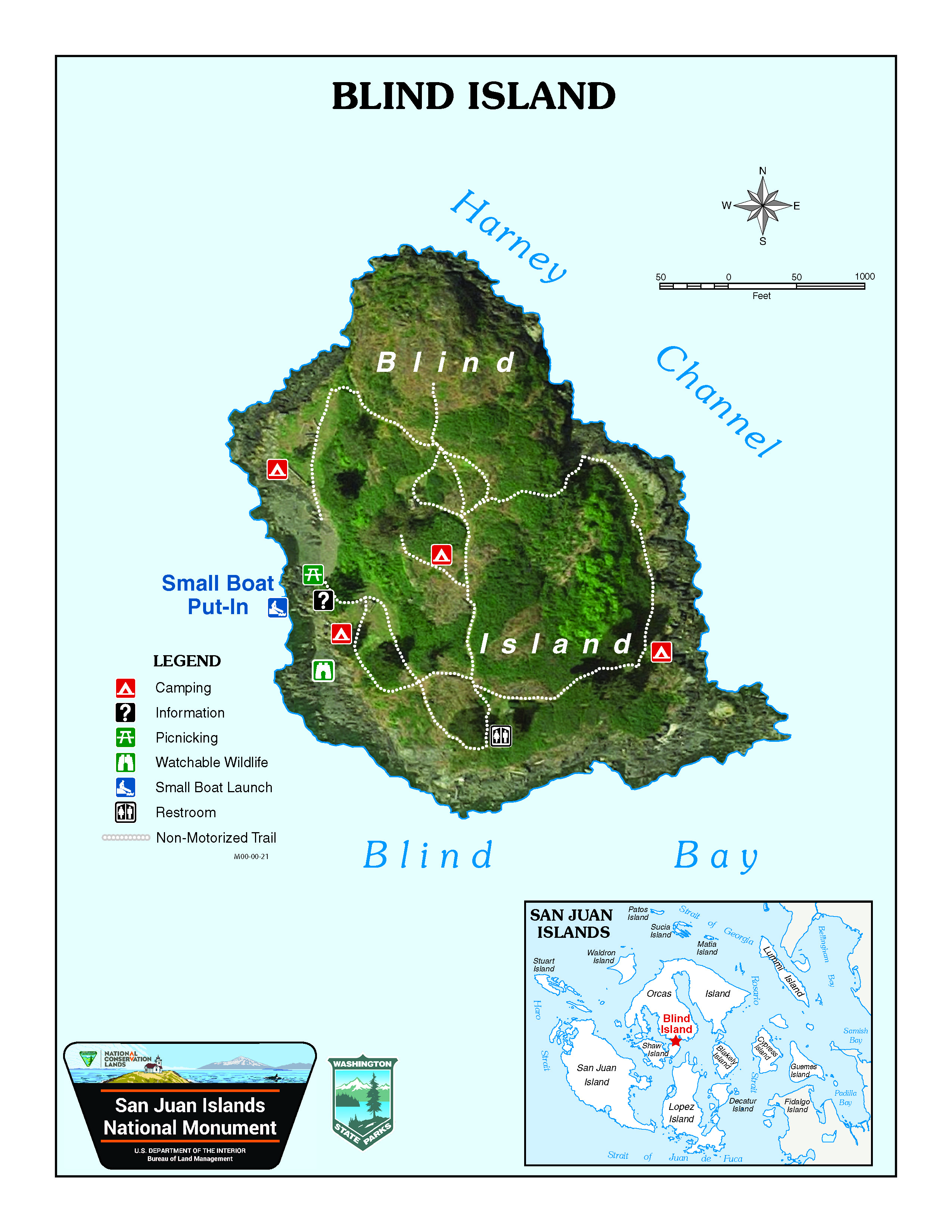

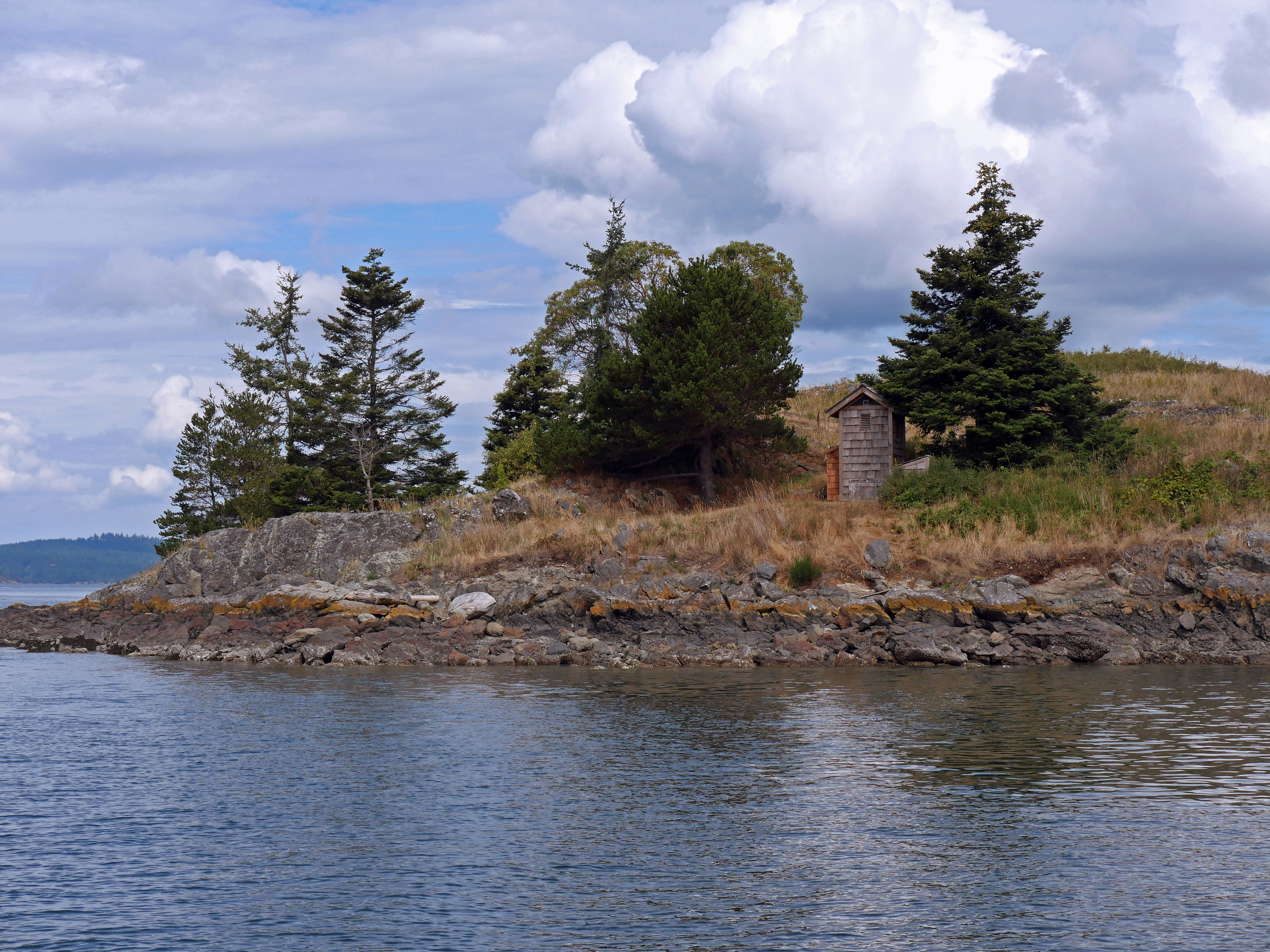
- Blind Island

- Location within Washington (state) Location within the United States
- Interactive map of Blind Island Marine State Park
- Location: San Juan County, Washington, United States
- Nearest city: Anacortes, Washington
- Coordinates: 48°35′05″N 122°56′13″W
- Area: 2.4 acres (0.97 ha)
- Elevation: 26 ft (7.9 m)
- Established: 1970
- Administrator: Washington State Parks and Recreation Commission
- Website: Official website

Blind Island Marine State Park is a public recreation area consisting of the entirety of Blind Island, an island of less than 3 acres (1.2 ha) at the entrance to Shaw Island's Blind Bay in San Juan County, Washington. The island lies one-third of a mile west of the Shaw Island ferry terminal and has 1,280 feet (390 m) of saltwater shoreline. The park is cooperatively managed by the U.S. Bureau of Land Management and Washington State Parks and is part of the San Juan Islands National Monument.

== History ==
In the late 1800s, a man named John Fox homesteaded the island and built a small house and storage sheds. Fox was an immigrant from Germany, where he had made his living as a fisherman. After his divorce from Katherine Fox Dickman, he moved to the island where he lived as a fisherman and tilled a small garden spot, evidence of which still remains today. He died in 1934 at the age of 83 and was buried on Blind Island. Fox's son, also named John, lived alone on the island until the mid-1960s when he was moved to a nursing home. He died in Oak Harbor, Washington in 1971. The Foxes dug several holes into the rock, evidently to be used as cisterns. There is a small spring, around which a concrete retainer was built that is still in place. There is no potable water on the island.

The island became a state park in 1970 under lease from the BLM. All buildings were removed in 1972 due to their unsafe condition.

== Activities and amenities ==
As a stop on the Cascadia Marine Trail, the island's campsites are restricted to visitors arriving in non-motorized watercraft. Activities include observing the abundant wildlife and the frequent passing of ferries.
