= Bottle Beach =

Bottle Beach may refer to:

- Bottle Beach, Washington, U.S., see Bottle Beach State Park
- Hat Khuat, Thailand, translates as "Bottle Beach"
- Bottle Beach, New York on the shore of Dead Horse Bay
