= Cutts Island State Park =

Park in Pierce County, Washington, US

Cutts Island Marine State Park
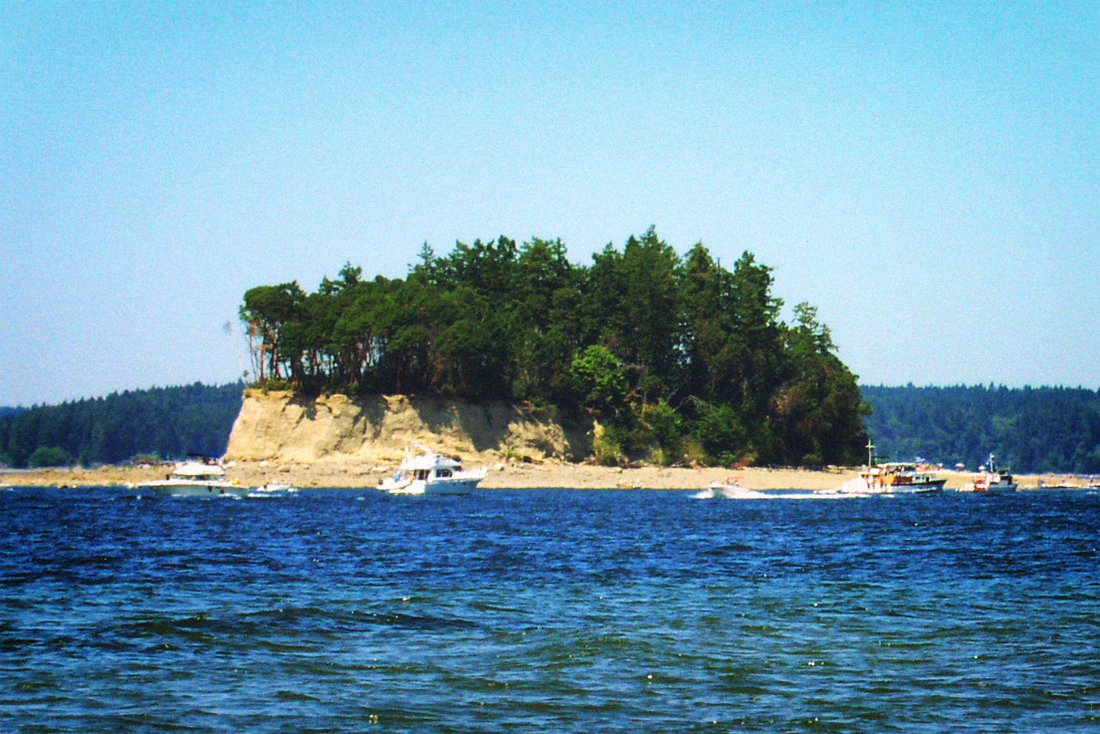
- Cutts (or Deadman's) Island

- Location within Washington (state) Location within the United States
- Interactive map of Cutts Island Marine State Park
- Location: Pierce County, Washington, United States
- Nearest city: Gig Harbor, Washington
- Coordinates: 47°19′15″N 122°41′13″W
- Area: 2 acres (0.81 ha)
- Elevation: 10 ft (3.0 m)
- Established: 1969
- Administrator: Washington State Parks and Recreation Commission
- Website: Official website

Cutts Island State Park is a public recreation area park comprising the entirety of two-acre (0.81 ha) Cutts Island in Carr Inlet in Pierce County, Washington. The island is a clay butte with a stand of trees and a teardrop-shaped beach at low tide. It sits one half-mile offshore from Kopachuck State Park and is accessible only by water and occasionally by sandbar at extremely low tide. Eight mooring buoys are available for boaters. Park activities include beachcombing and scuba diving.

Island names

Cutts Island has also been known as "Crow Island," after the crows found in abundance on the island in 1792 by explorer Peter Puget, and "Scotts Island," after Thomas Scott, quartermaster of the 1841 Wilkes expedition. The belief that the island served as a burial ground for Native American tribes who placed their dead in canoes in the forks of trees gave birth to the name "Deadman's Island." The origin of the name "Cutts Island" is unknown.
