= Spencer Park =

Spencer Park may refer to:

- Spencer Park, Western Australia, a northeastern suburb of Albany, Australia
- Spencer Park, New Zealand, a park north of Christchurch, New Zealand
- Spencer Park Dentzel Carousel, a carousel in Logansport, United States
- Spencer Smith Park, a park in Burlington, Canada
- Spencer Spit State Park, part of the Washington State Park System, United States
- Spencer Park, Queensland, stadium in Newmarket, Queensland
