= Massacre Bay =

Massacre Bay may refer to:

- Massacre Bay (Alaska)
- Massacre Bay in New Zealand, the original name for Golden Bay / Mohua
- Massacre Bay (American Samoa), in Aʻasu, American Samoa; see American Samoa#18th century: First Western contact
- Massacre Bay (Washington)
