= Kinney Point State Park =

State park in Jefferson County, Washington, US

- Location within Washington (state) Location within the United States
- Location: Jefferson County, Washington, United States
- Coordinates: 48°00′31″N 122°41′23″W
- Area: 67 acres (27 ha)
- Elevation: 39 ft (12 m)
- Administrator: Washington State Parks and Recreation Commission
- Website: Official website

Kinney Point State Park is a 67-acre (27 ha) Washington marine state park in Jefferson County. The park sits on 683 feet (208 m) of shoreline at the south end of Marrowstone Island and has no upland access. The park is part of the Cascadia Marine Trail with campsites restricted to boaters arriving by other than motorized means. Park activities include fishing, clam digging, and crabbing.
