= Fay Bainbridge Park =

Public park on Bainbridge Island, WA

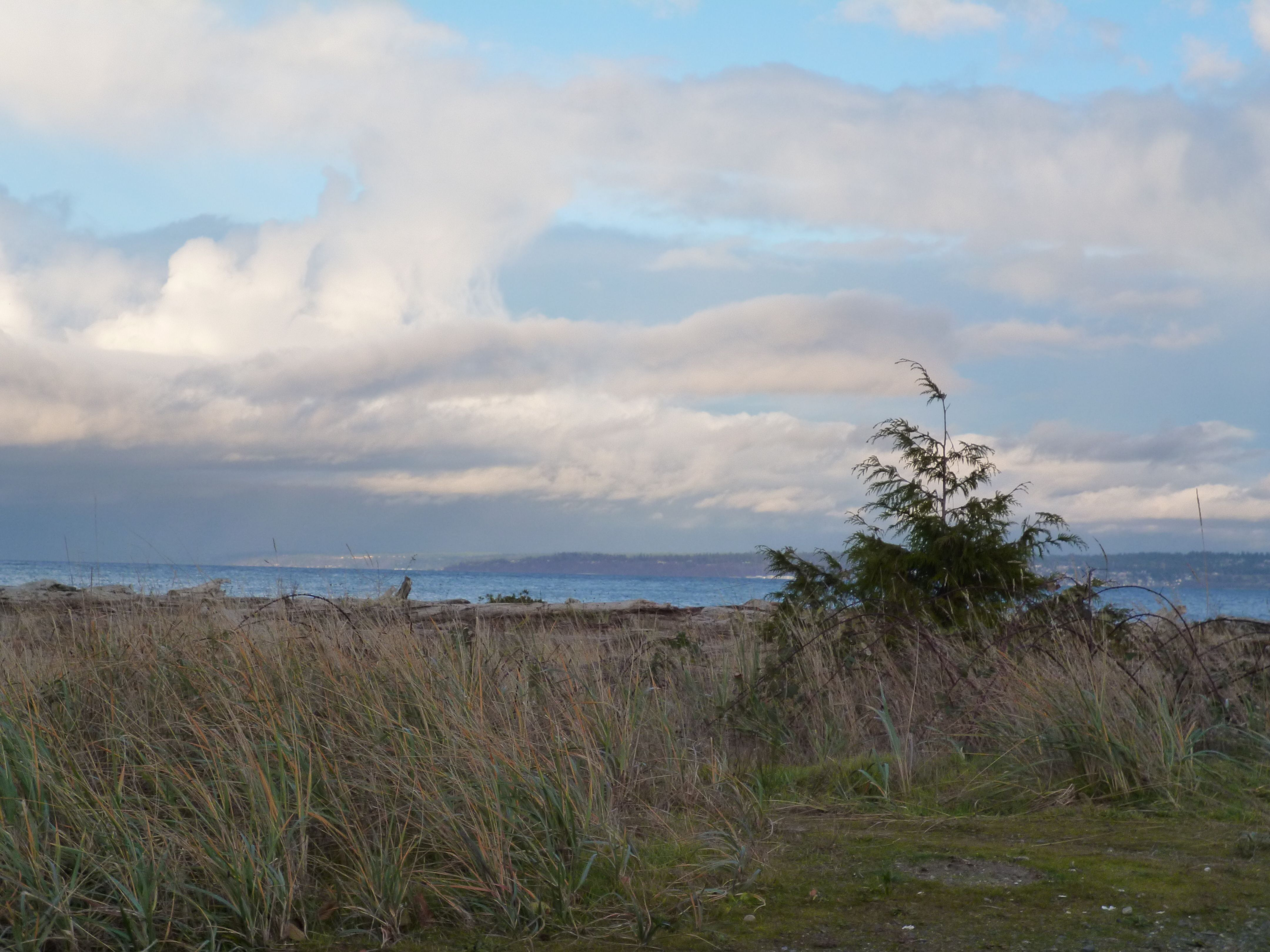

- Location within Washington (state)
- Location: Kitsap County, Washington, United States of America
- Coordinates: 47°42′06″N 122°30′27″W
- Area: 17 acres (6.9 ha)
- Governing body: Bainbridge Island Metropolitan Park and Recreation District
- Website: Fay Bainbridge Park

Fay Bainbridge Park is a locally operated, public recreation area situated immediately south of the Point Monroe sandspit on the northeast tip of Bainbridge Island, Washington and is open from dawn to dusk. The park comprises 17 acres (6.9 ha) of land, including 1,420 feet (430 m) of shoreline on Puget Sound.The park offers beach activities and camping in addition to views of Puget Sound, the Cascade Mountains and two volcanoes: Mount Rainier and Mount Baker.

== History ==
In 1944, the state purchased the land for the park for $5,000 from the estate of Temple S. Fay with the stipulation that the Washington State Park System maintain the name Fay. Temple S. Fay was a neurosurgeon who introduced the use of hypothermia in medical and surgical illnesses and who also developed rehabilitation procedures based upon analysis of phylogenetic movements. Fay taught at the University of Washington. His two children honored their father's desire to make the area a park.

At the park entrance is a display of a bell donated by the Kitsap County Historical Society. This bell was purchased for the community by Port Madison citizens through public subscription to be used as a "town crier" to proclaim important events. At the request of G.A. Meigs, the bell was brought from San Francisco around 1883 by Captain Jeremiah W. Farnham, allegedly to become the school belfry. As Port Madison needed to provide a courthouse on short notice, they converted the nearly-finished school and the bell was placed on the old public community hall on mill property. It was later moved to A.R. Lintner's Historical Association, and it was moved to the park on March 23, 1953.

The park was formerly known as Fay Bainbridge State Park. It was among several state parks turned over to local authorities by the Washington State Park System beginning in 2009. The park was officially transferred to the Bainbridge Island Metropolitan Park and Recreation District in May 2011.

== Facilities ==
Fay Bainbridge Park has 15 tent sites for overnight camping and 26 utility sites. As a stop on the Cascadia Marine Trail. Picnicking facilities are also available.
