= Posey Island State Park =

State park in Washington (state), United States

Posey Island Marine State Park
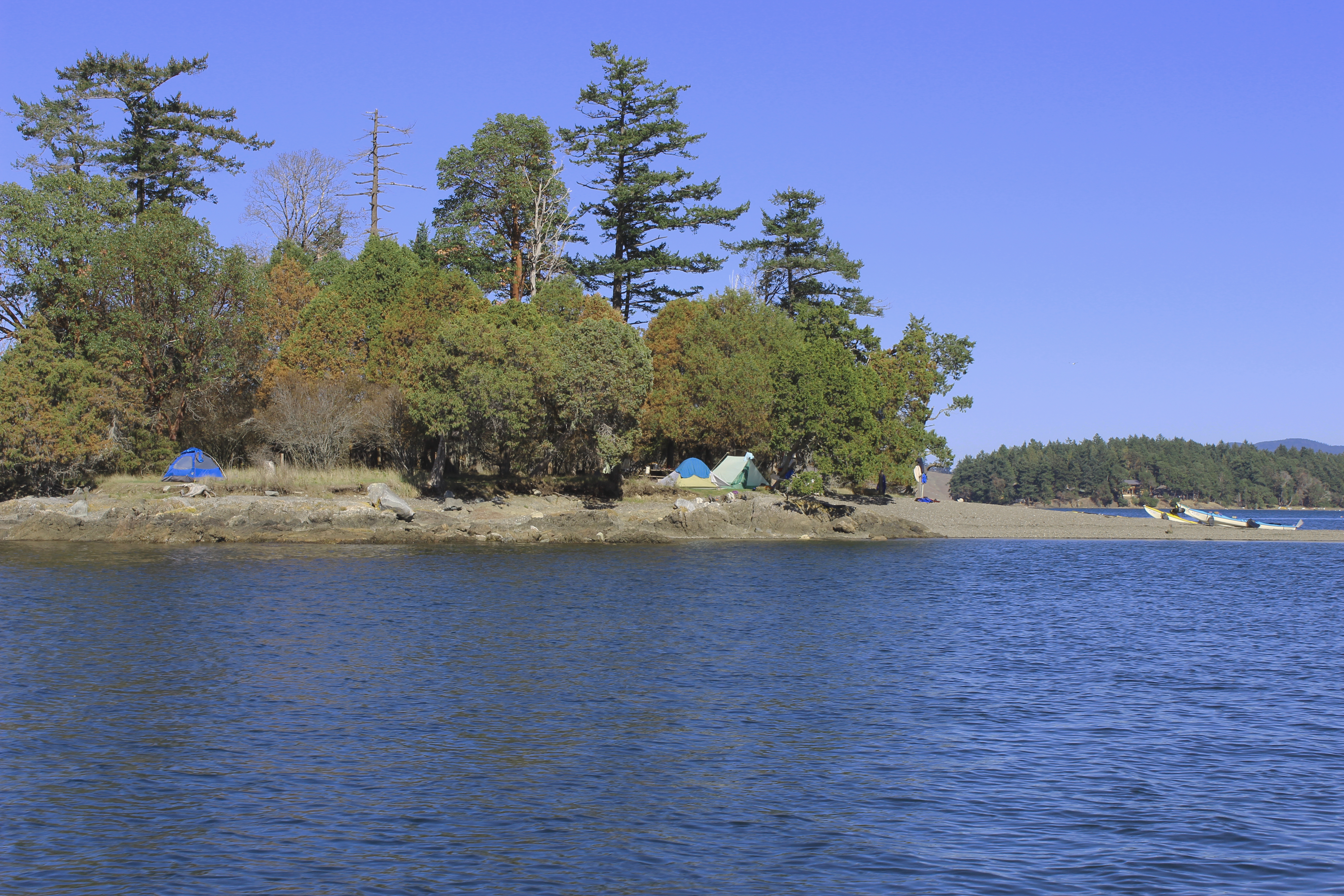

- Location within Washington (state) Location within the United States
- Location: San Juan County, Washington, United States
- Nearest town: Friday Harbor, Washington
- Coordinates: 48°37′06″N 123°10′03″W
- Area: 1.1 acres (0.45 ha)
- Elevation: 13 ft (4.0 m)
- Established: 1960
- Administrator: Washington State Parks and Recreation Commission
- Website: Official website

Posey Island State Park is a 1-acre (0.40 ha) public recreation area encompassing Posey Island in San Juan County, Washington, United States. The island is located .25 miles (0.40 km) north of Pearl Island, near Roche Harbor, San Juan Island, and has about 1,000 feet (300 m) of saltwater shoreline on Spieden Channel. The park's two campsites are part of the Cascadia Marine Trail and are restricted to visitors arriving in non-motorized watercraft. The island-park is managed by the Washington State Parks and Recreation Commission. It became a state park in 1960 under lease from the U.S. Bureau of Land Management.
