= Stuart Island State Park =

State park in Washington (state), United States

Stuart Island Marine State Park
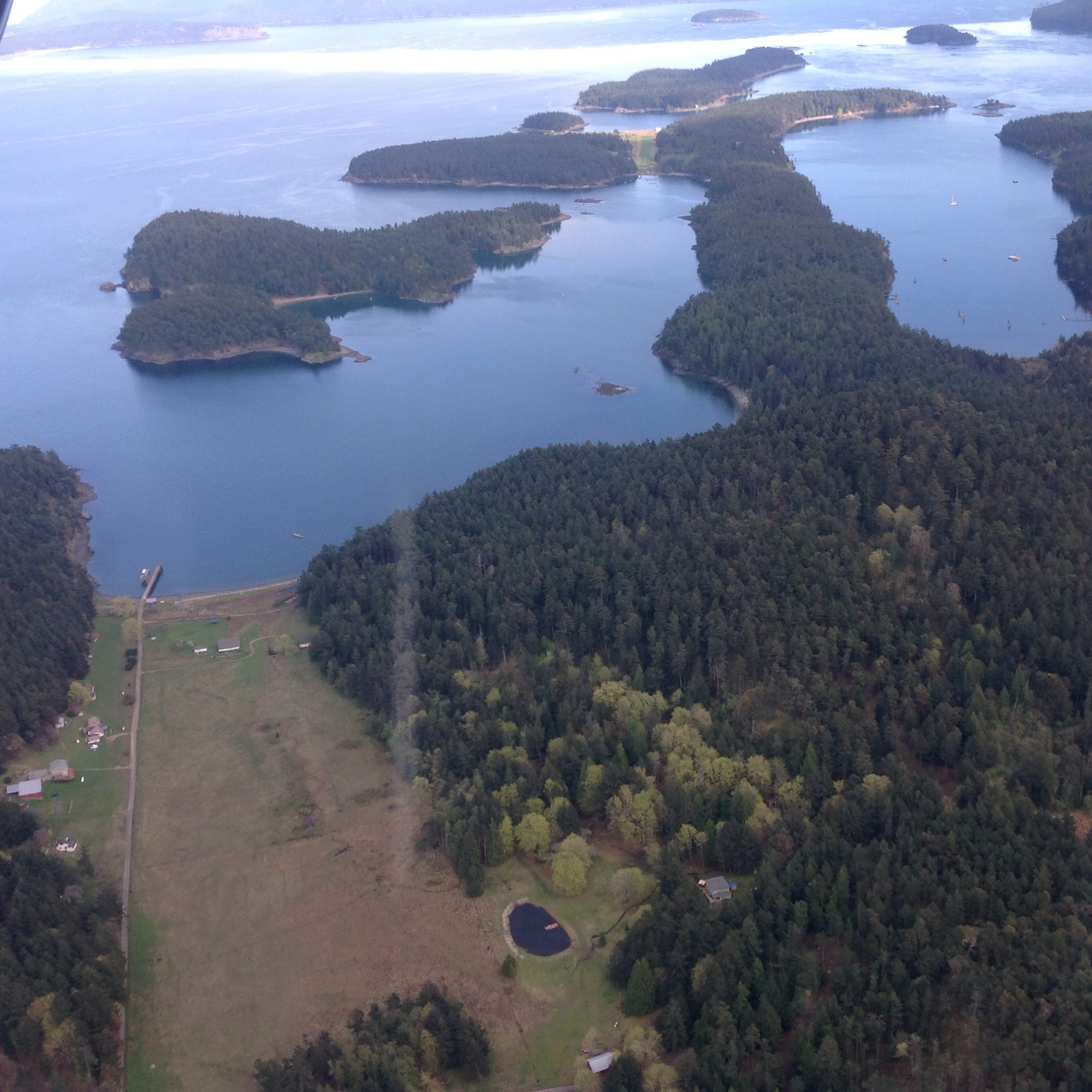
- Prevost Harbor and Reid Harbor (right)

- Location within Washington (state) Location within the United States
- Location: San Juan County, Washington, United States
- Coordinates: 48°40′44″N 123°12′42″W
- Area: 433 acres (175 ha)
- Elevation: 427 ft (130 m)
- Established: 1952
- Administrator: Washington State Parks and Recreation Commission
- Website: Official website

Stuart Island State Park in San Juan County, Washington is a marine camping park in the Washington State Park System. It consists of 433 acres (175 ha) of land and waterways on and around Stuart Island, named for Frederick D. Stuart, clerk to explorer Charles Wilkes.

== Activities and amenities ==
The park has 33,030 feet (10,070 m) of saltwater shoreline with moorage at Reid Harbor and Prevost Harbor. Activities include hiking on 3.5 miles (5.6 km) of trails, boating, scuba diving, fishing, and crabbing. The park is part of the Cascadia Marine Trail; some of its 18 primitive campsites are reserved for boaters arriving by other than motorized means.
