= Pacific Beach State Park =

State park in Washington (state), United States

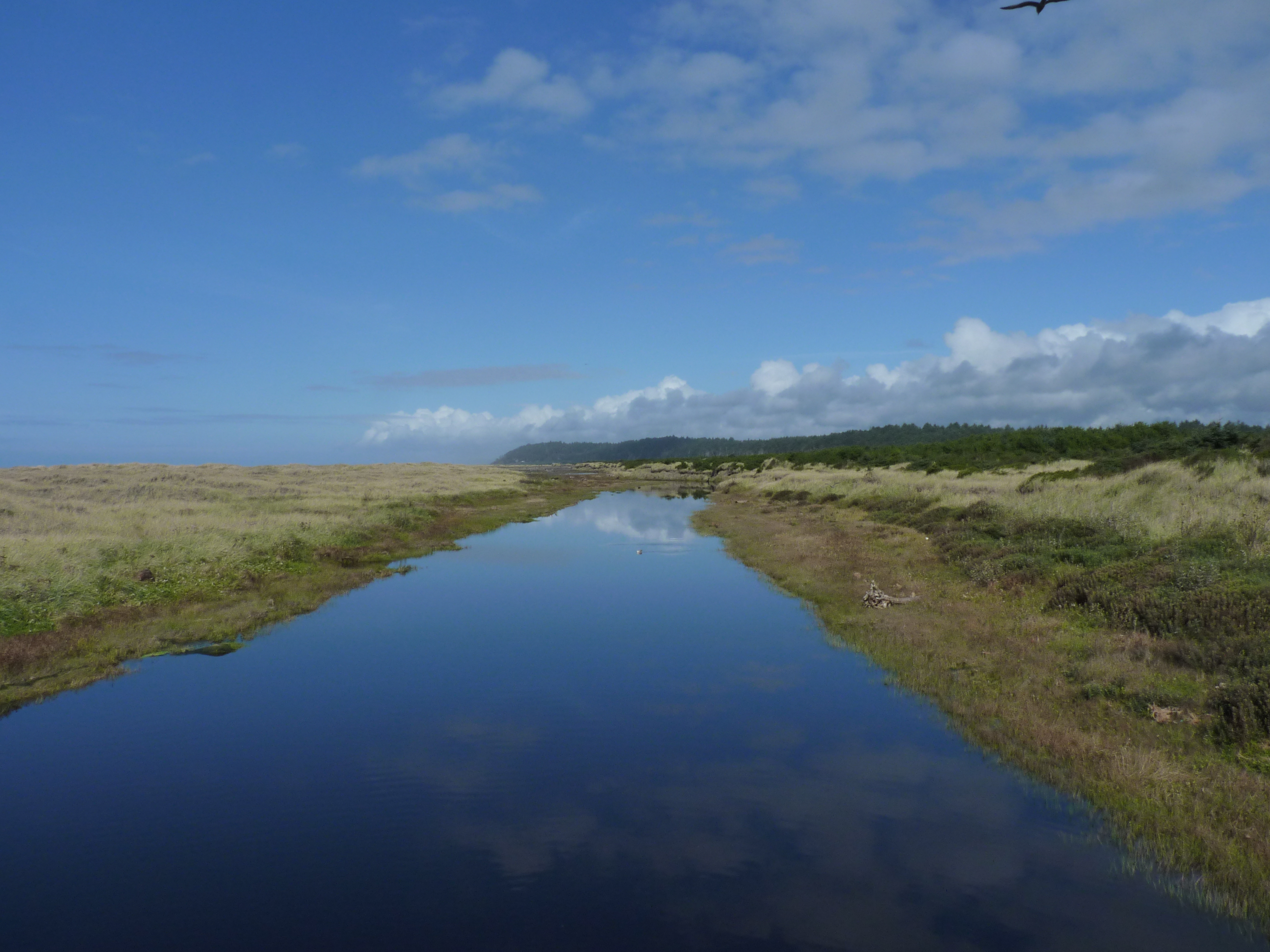
- Pacific Beach State Park, October 2013

- Location within Washington (state) Location within the United States
- Location: Grays Harbor County, Washington, United States
- Coordinates: 47°12′19″N 124°12′10″W
- Area: 17 acres (6.9 ha)
- Elevation: 16 ft (4.9 m)
- Administrator: Washington State Parks and Recreation Commission
- Website: Official website

Pacific Beach State Park is a public recreation area in Grays Harbor County, Washington. The 17-acre (6.9 ha) state park offers 2,300 feet (700 m) of Pacific Ocean beachfront and activities that include picnicking, camping, fishing, swimming, clam digging, and beachcombing.
