= Reed Island State Park =

State park in Washington (state), United States

- Location within Washington (state) Location within the United States
- Location: Clark County, Washington, United States
- Coordinates: 45°33′07″N 122°18′15″W
- Area: 510 acres (210 ha)
- Elevation: 26 ft (7.9 m)
- Established: 1954
- Administrator: Washington State Parks and Recreation Commission
- Website: Official website

Reed Island State Park is a public recreation area on the Columbia River three miles (4.8 km) east of Washougal in Clark County, Washington. The state park comprises 510-acre (210 ha) Reed island and is only accessible by boat. The island was given to the state by the family of Secretary of State Sam Reed in 1954. It is part of the Columbia River Water Trail and has primitive camping and picnicking areas.
