= Twanoh State Park =

State park in Washington (state), United States

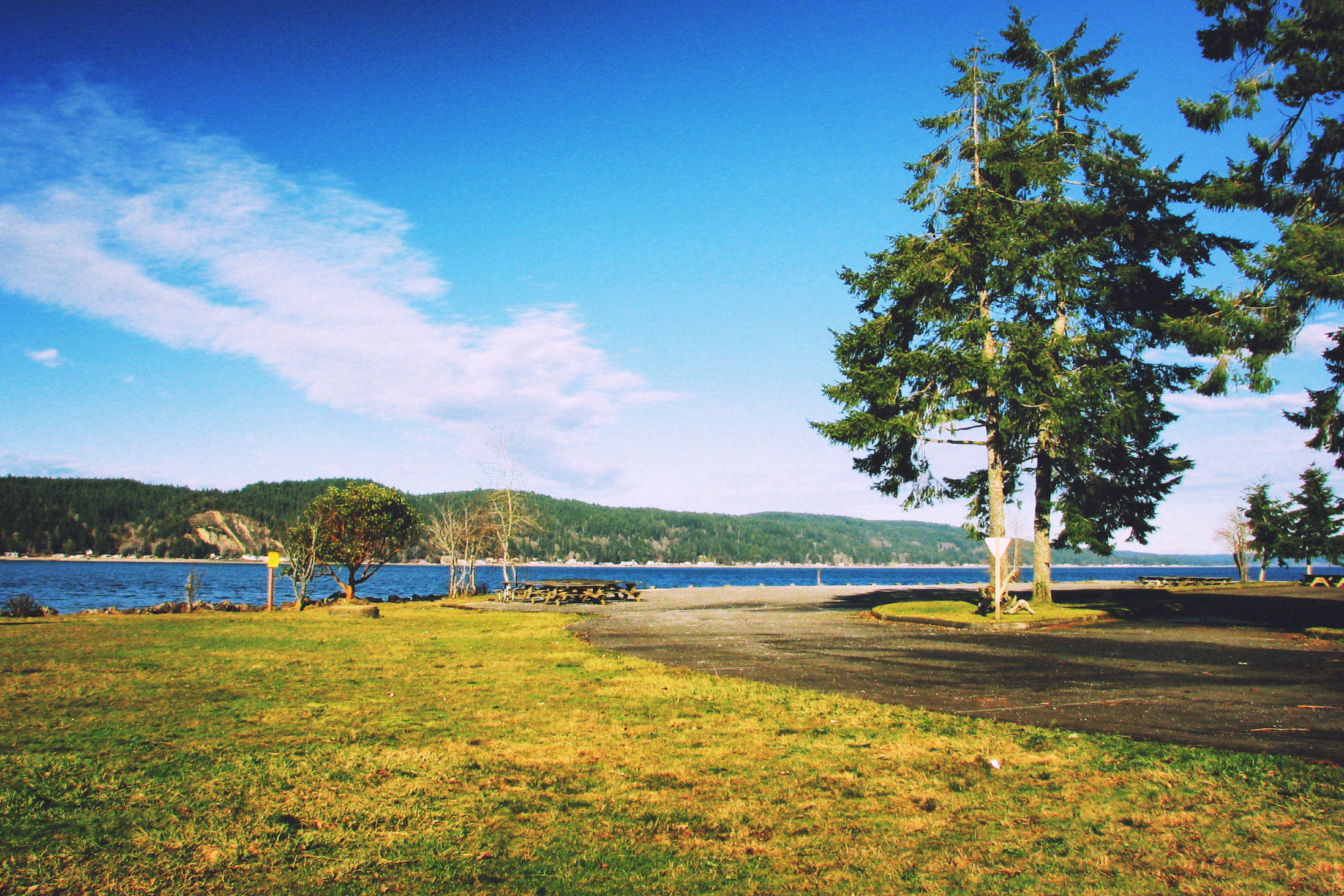

- Location within Washington (state) Location within the United States
- Location: Mason County, Washington, United States
- Coordinates: 47°22′30″N 122°58′26″W
- Area: 188 acres (76 ha)
- Elevation: 164 ft (50 m)
- Established: 1923
- Administrator: Washington State Parks and Recreation Commission
- Visitors: 543,001 (in 2024)
- Website: Official website
- Twanoh State Park
- U.S. National Register of Historic Places
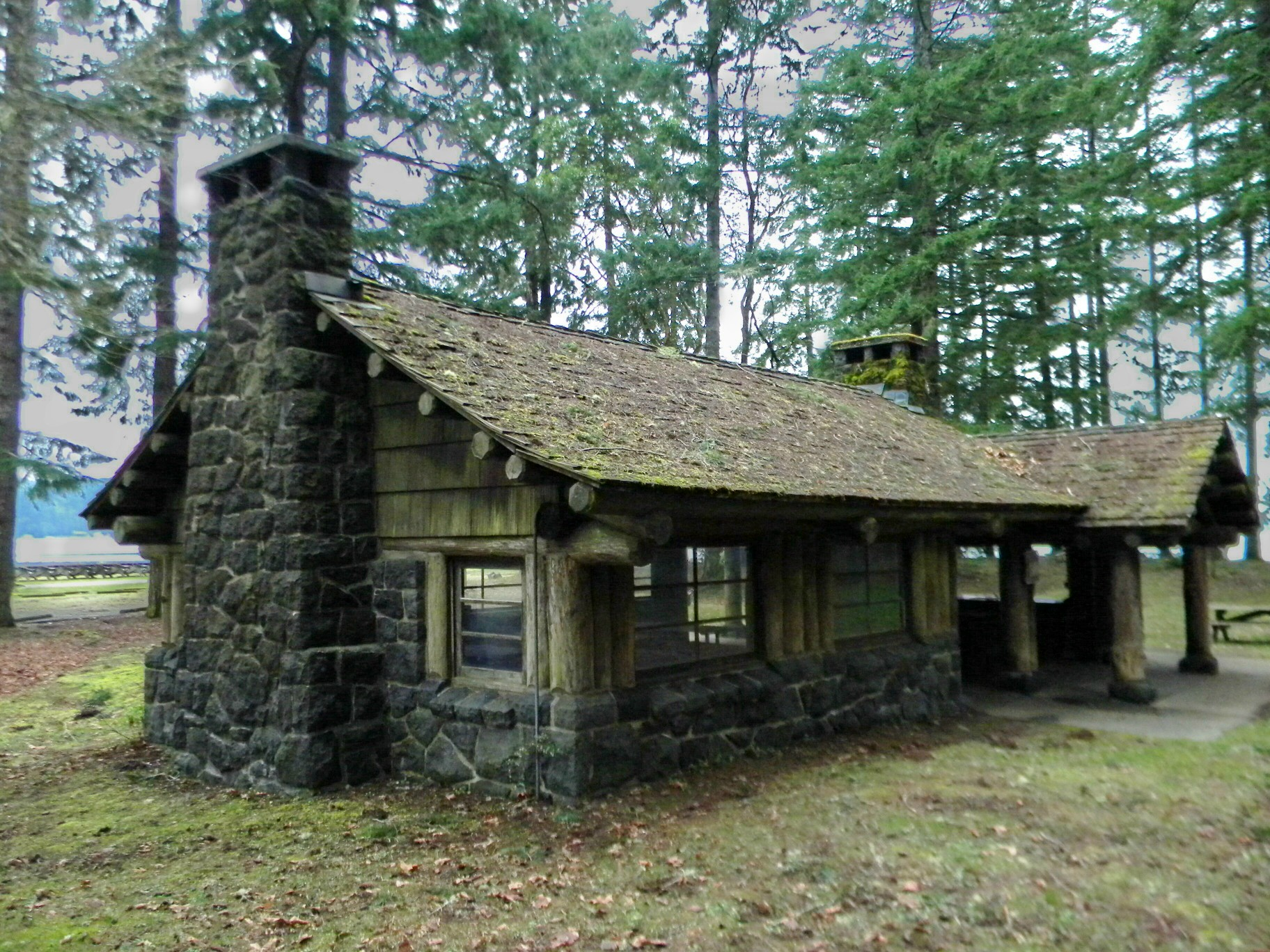
- Location: 12190 State Route 106, Union, Mason County, Washington
- Area: 182 acres (74 ha)
- Architectural style: Bungalow/Craftsman; Rustic/National Park
- NRHP reference No.: 14000614
- Added to NRHP: September 10, 2014

Twanoh State Park is a public recreation area located 16 miles (26 km) southwest of Belfair on the east side of Hood Canal in Mason County, Washington. The state park's 188 acres (76 ha) include 3,167 feet (965 m) of saltwater shoreline and 2.5 miles (4.0 km) of inland hiking trails. The park is managed by the Washington State Parks and Recreation Commission.

== History ==
The area was originally the home of the Native American Twana tribes, better known as the Skokomish, from whose name the park's name derives. Evidence of the area's logging history of the 1890s can be seen on the park's woodland hiking trails.

In 1922, the state leased 30 acres to be used as a state park, then after finalizing purchase of the property dedicated the park in 1923. The well-preserved complex of structures created in the 1930s by the Civilian Conservation Corps led to the park's being named to the National Register of Historic Places in 2014.

== Activities and amenities ==
Park activities include camping, hiking, boating, fishing, swimming, waterskiing, crabbing, oyster harvesting, beachcombing, bird watching, wildlife viewing, and horseshoes.
