= Penrose Point State Park =

State park in Washington (state), United States

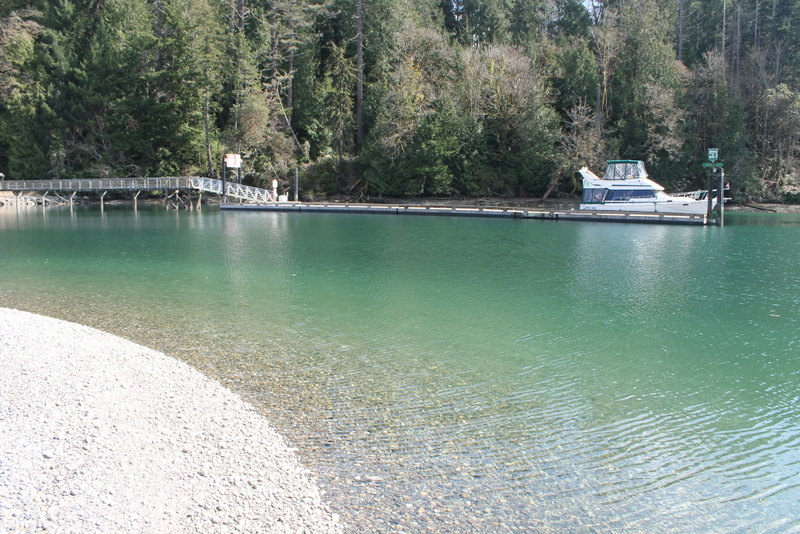

- Location within Washington (state) Location within the United States
- Location: Pierce County, Washington, United States
- Coordinates: 47°15′54″N 122°44′13″W
- Area: 165 acres (67 ha)
- Elevation: 3 ft (0.91 m)
- Established: 1953)
- Administrator: Washington State Parks and Recreation Commission
- Visitors: 245,594 (in 2024)
- Website: Official website

Penrose Point State Park is a 165-acre (67 ha) Washington state park located on Mayo Cove and Carr Inlet at the southern end of Puget Sound in Pierce County. The park has over 2 miles (3.2 km) of saltwater shoreline as well as 2.5 miles (4.0 km) of hiking and biking trails and an interpretive nature trail. Park activities include picnicking, boating, scuba diving, fishing, swimming, waterskiing, clam digging, crabbing, beachcombing, birdwatching, wildlife viewing, and horseshoes. The park was named after Stephen Penrose, the president of Whitman College in Walla Walla from 1884 to 1934.
