= Doe Island Marine State Park =

State park in Washington, US

- Location within Washington (state) Location within the United States
- Location: San Juan County, Washington, United States
- Nearest town: Eastsound, Washington
- Coordinates: 48°37′58″N 122°47′14″W
- Area: 6.11 acres (2.47 ha)
- Elevation: 36 ft (11 m)
- Established: 1964
- Administrator: Washington State Parks and Recreation Commission
- Website: Official website

Doe Island Marine State Park is a public recreation area only accessible by water comprising the entirety of Doe Island in the San Juan Islands group in San Juan County, Washington. The 6.11-acre (2.47 ha) island lies .25 miles (0.40 km) southeast of Orcas Island and has 2,049 feet (625 m) of shoreline. The Washington State Parks originally acquired a portion of the island from the Bureau of Land Management in 1964 for $15.27, with a second acquisition in 1967 from the DNR at no cost.

== Activities and amenities ==
- A rugged hiking trail three-tenths of a mile long circles the island.
- Camping, with five no-reservation sites, each with a fire ring, picnic tables, and a vault toilet. That being said, the island does not have potable water or electricity.
- Boating, although community reports indicate that the dock on the island was destroyed and has yet to be repaired.
- Fishing as well as oyster and crab harvesting.
- Birdwatching and wildlife viewing.
