= Spencer Spit State Park =

State park in Washington State, US

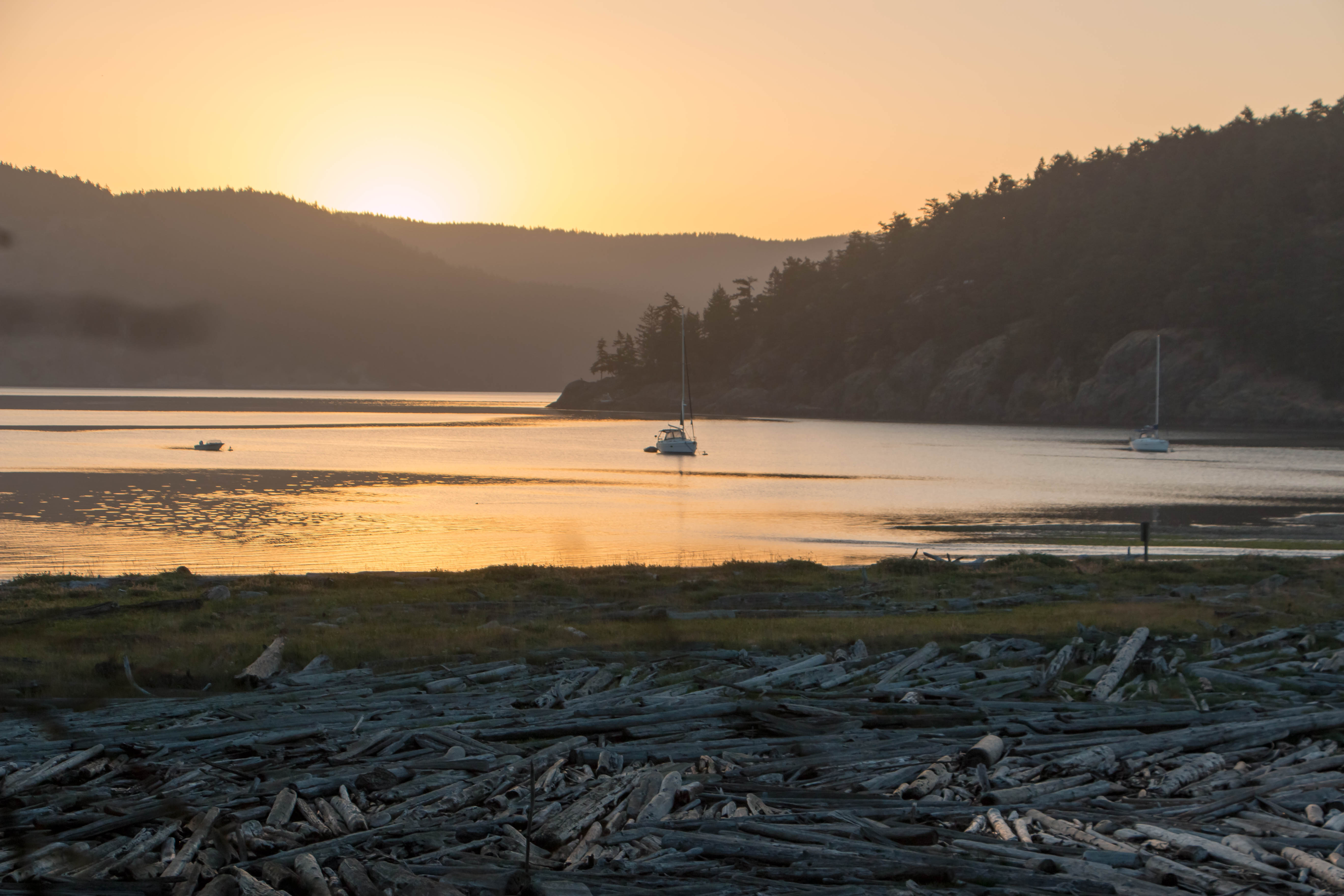

- Location within Washington (state) Location within the United States
- Location: San Juan County, Washington, United States
- Coordinates: 48°32′11″N 122°51′08″W
- Area: 200 acres (81 ha)
- Elevation: 10 ft (3.0 m)
- Established: 1967
- Administrator: Washington State Parks and Recreation Commission
- Visitors: 104,588 (in 2024)
- Website: Official website

Spencer Spit State Park is a public recreation area covering 138 acres (56 ha) with 7,840 feet of shoreline on the eastern shore of Lopez Island in San Juan County, Washington. The state park overlooks Lopez Sound and features a sand spit enclosing a salt-chuck lagoon.

== History ==
As Native American tribes migrated up and down the coast, they would stop in this location to clam, crab and fish. Native American activity continued in this area until 1946. The park was originally homesteaded in the 1870s by Katherine and Franklin Troxell. In the late 1800s, they sold the land to Ray and Kathryn "Kate" Spencer, who owned property on Lopez Island and Blakley Island (an island just off the shore of Lopez Island). Between 1913 and 1920, they built a small cabin on one of the sand spits. The stone cellar of the old Spencer House can be seen near the spit. A replica of the original log cabin built by the Spencers for guests is out on the tip of the spit. Ray and Kate lived here for 50 years. The family sold it to the state in 1967. The state was interested in this undeveloped parcel of land because of the blue herons that can be found on it.

== Plant life ==
Alder, cedar, Douglas fir, and maple trees. Apples, wild berries, and cherries. Eel grass, ferns, foxglove hemlock, moss or lichens, rose, seaweed, thistle, and yew.

== Wildlife ==
The lagoon provides a migratory stop for waterfowl, including Bonaparte's gulls. Other local fauna include great blue herons and kingfishers. Birds include crows or ravens, ducks, bald eagles, geese, gulls, hawks, herons, hummingbirds, ospreys, owls, woodpeckers, and wrens. Fish and sea life includes clams, cod, crabs, perch, salmon, seabirds, seas, shark, shellfish, and the occasional Southern Resident Orcas pod passing by. Mammals include chipmunks, deer, rabbits, raccoons, otters, and squirrels.

== Activities and amenities ==
The park offers camping, picnicking, and mooring buoys on the Cascadia Marine Trail. Other recreational opportunities include swimming, bald eagle viewing, bird watching, hiking, viewpoints, ferry watching, fishing, clamming, diving, and beachcombing.
