= Pleasant Harbor State Park =

State park in Washington (state), United States

Pleasant Harbor State Park Property
- Location within Washington (state) Location within the United States
- Location: Jefferson County, Washington, United States
- Coordinates: 47°39′53″N 122°54′50″W
- Area: 1 acre (0.40 ha)
- Elevation: 0 ft (0 m)
- Established: 1955
- Administrator: Washington State Parks and Recreation Commission
- Website: Official website

Pleasant Harbor State Park is a marine state park located off Highway 101, two miles (3.2 km) south of Brinnon in Jefferson County, Washington. The park is a one-acre moorage facility for fishing, boating, and scuba diving only and no other services.

Pleasant Harbor and the adjoining Black Point Peninsula, which separates the harbor from Hood Canal, are the subject of an ongoing process for the development of a Master Planned Resort under the auspices of the Jefferson County Department of Community Development.
