= Upright Channel State Park =

Park in Washington (state), United States

Coordinates: 48.562046°N 122.909347°W

Upright Channel Park is a former unit of the Washington State Park System consisting of 20 acres (8.1 ha) of island, beach, and tidelands on Upright Channel in the northwest corner of Lopez Island. The park was not listed as a Washington State Parks property as of March 2014. San Juan County assumed management of the property per a memorandum of understanding in May 2014.
