= Spring Creek Hatchery State Park =

State park in Washington (state), United States

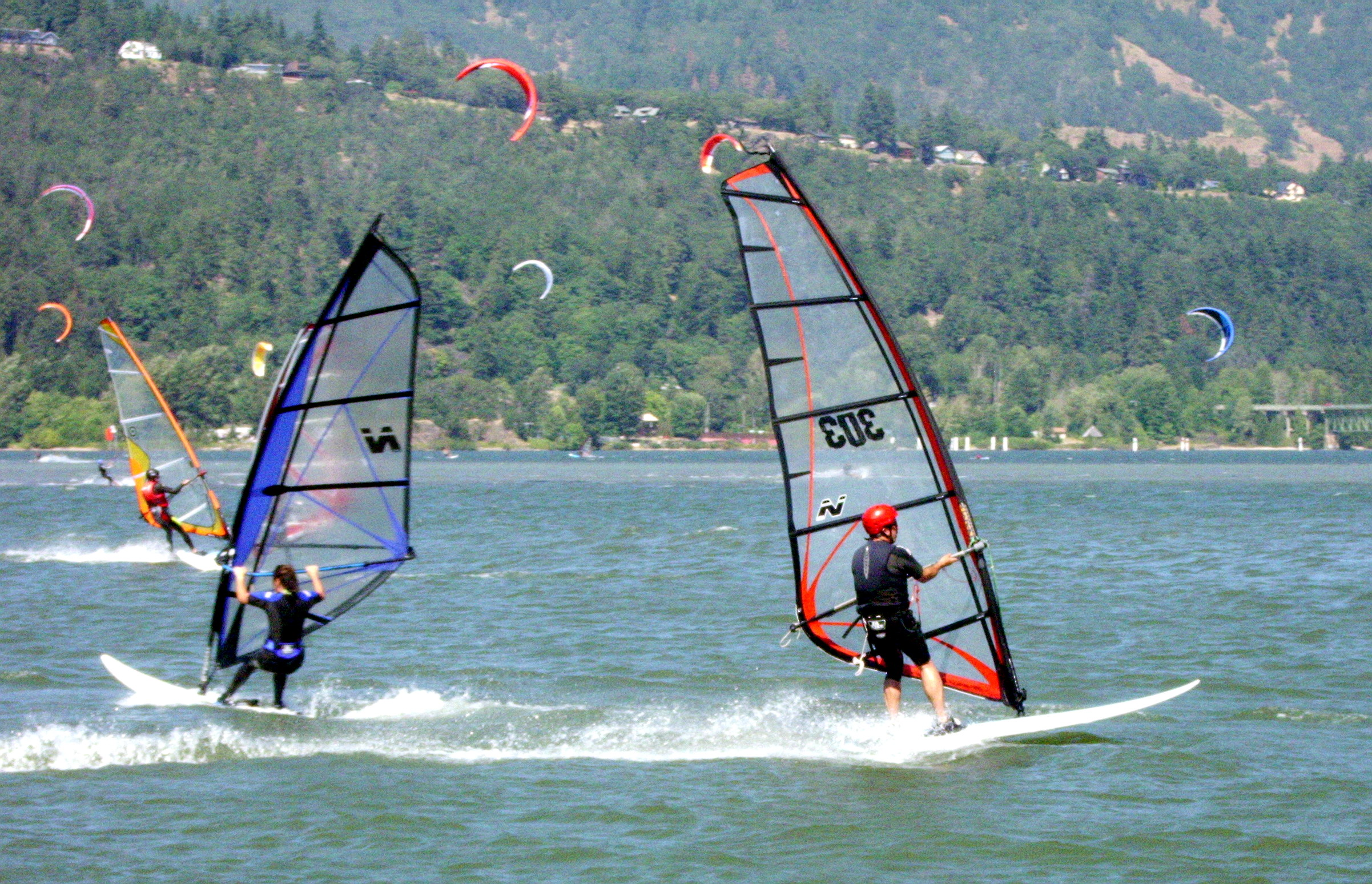
- Windsurfers on the Columbia River as seen from Hood River, Oregon

- Location within Washington (state) Location within the United States
- Location: Skamania County, Washington, United States
- Coordinates: 45°43′26″N 121°33′29″W
- Area: 10 acres (4.0 ha)
- Administrator: Washington State Parks and Recreation Commission
- Visitors: 285,226 (in 2024)
- Website: Official website

Spring Creek Hatchery State Park is a public recreation area lying within the Columbia River Gorge National Scenic Area on Route 14 in Skamania County, Washington. The state park occupies 10 acres (4 hectares) directly across the Columbia River from Hood River, Oregon. It offers excellent windsurfing and kiteboarding opportunities, as well as picknicking, fishing, and wildlife viewing. The park lies next to the Spring Creek National Fish Hatchery, which offers interpretive programs and self-guided tours.

The 5-acre (2-hectare) windsurfing area is sometimes known as "The Hatchery" or "The Hatch". The rough water is considered expert-level.
