= Joemma Beach State Park =

Washington state park on Puget Sound in Pierce County

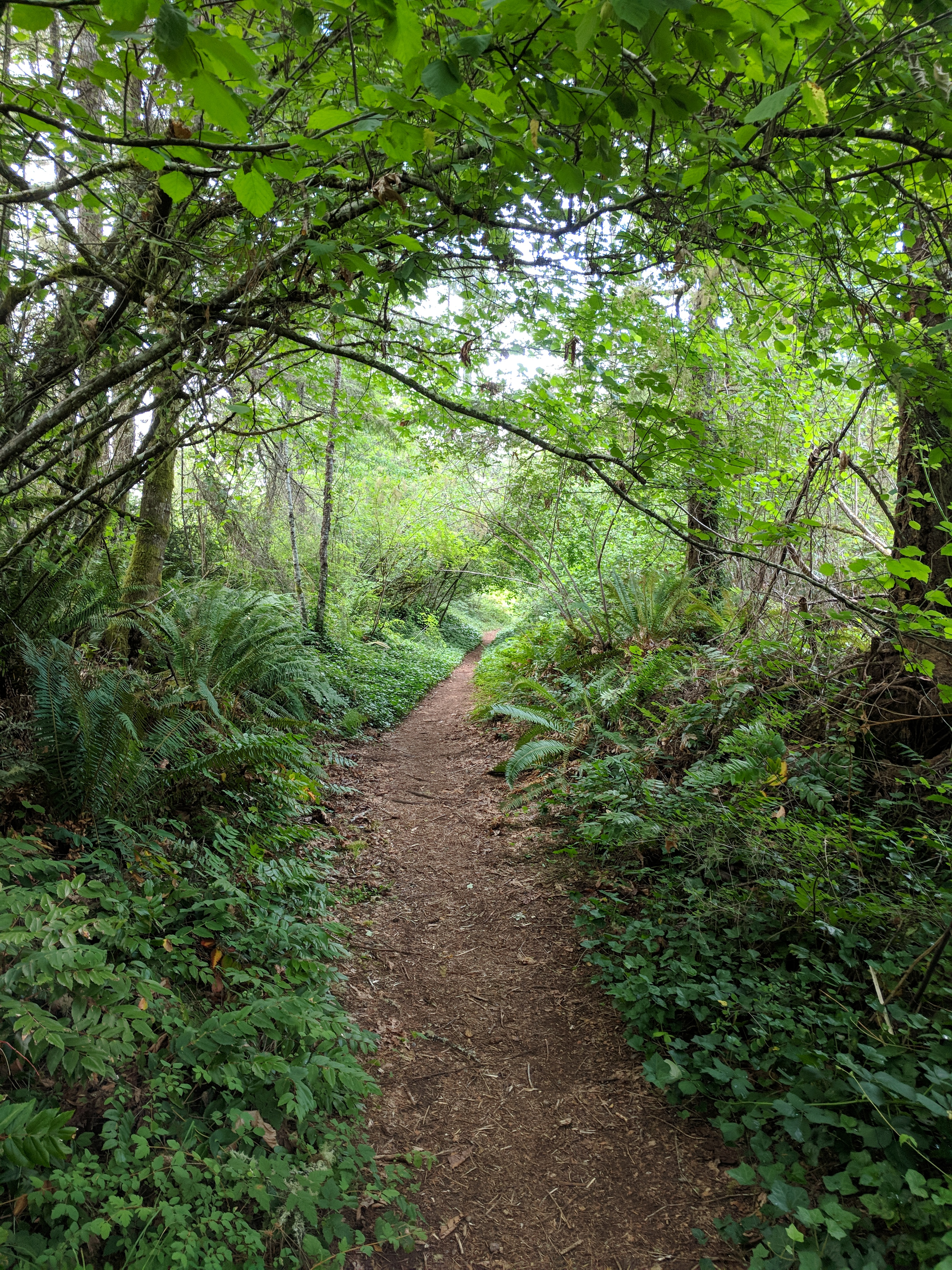
- Trail through the woods, Joemma Beach

- Location within Washington (state) Location within the United States
- Location: Pierce County, Washington, United States
- Coordinates: 47°13′28″N 122°48′32″W
- Area: 122 acres (49 ha)
- Elevation: 56 ft (17 m)
- Established: 1961 (state park transfer: 1995)
- Administrator: Washington State Parks and Recreation Commission
- Visitors: 78,627 (in 2024)
- Named after: Joe and Emma Smith
- Website: Official website

Joemma Beach State Park is a 122-acre (49 ha) Washington state park on Puget Sound in Pierce County. The park offers 3,000 feet (910 m) of saltwater shoreline on southeast Key Peninsula and opportunities for picnicking, camping, boating, fishing, waterskiing, crabbing, and beachcombing.
