= Doug's Beach State Park =

State park in Klickitat County, Washington, US

- Location within Washington (state) Location within the United States
- Location: Klickitat County, Washington, United States
- Coordinates: 45°40′37″N 121°14′05″W
- Area: 379 acres (153 ha)
- Established: 1993
- Administrator: Washington State Parks and Recreation Commission
- Visitors: 21,752 (in 2024)
- Named for: Dr. Doug Campbell
- Website: Official website

Doug's Beach State Park is a public recreation area in the Columbia River Gorge lying three miles (4.8 km) east of Lyle in Klickitat County, Washington. The state park occupies 379 acres (153 ha) along Washington State Route 14 at one of the premier windsurfing sites on the Columbia River. The park also offers picnicking, fishing, and swimming.

== History ==
Washington State Parks acquired the site through a land swap with the Department of Natural Resources. It bears the name of windsurfer Doug Campbell, who helped popularize the sport at this spot.
