= Shine Tidelands State Park =

State park in the U.S. state of Washington

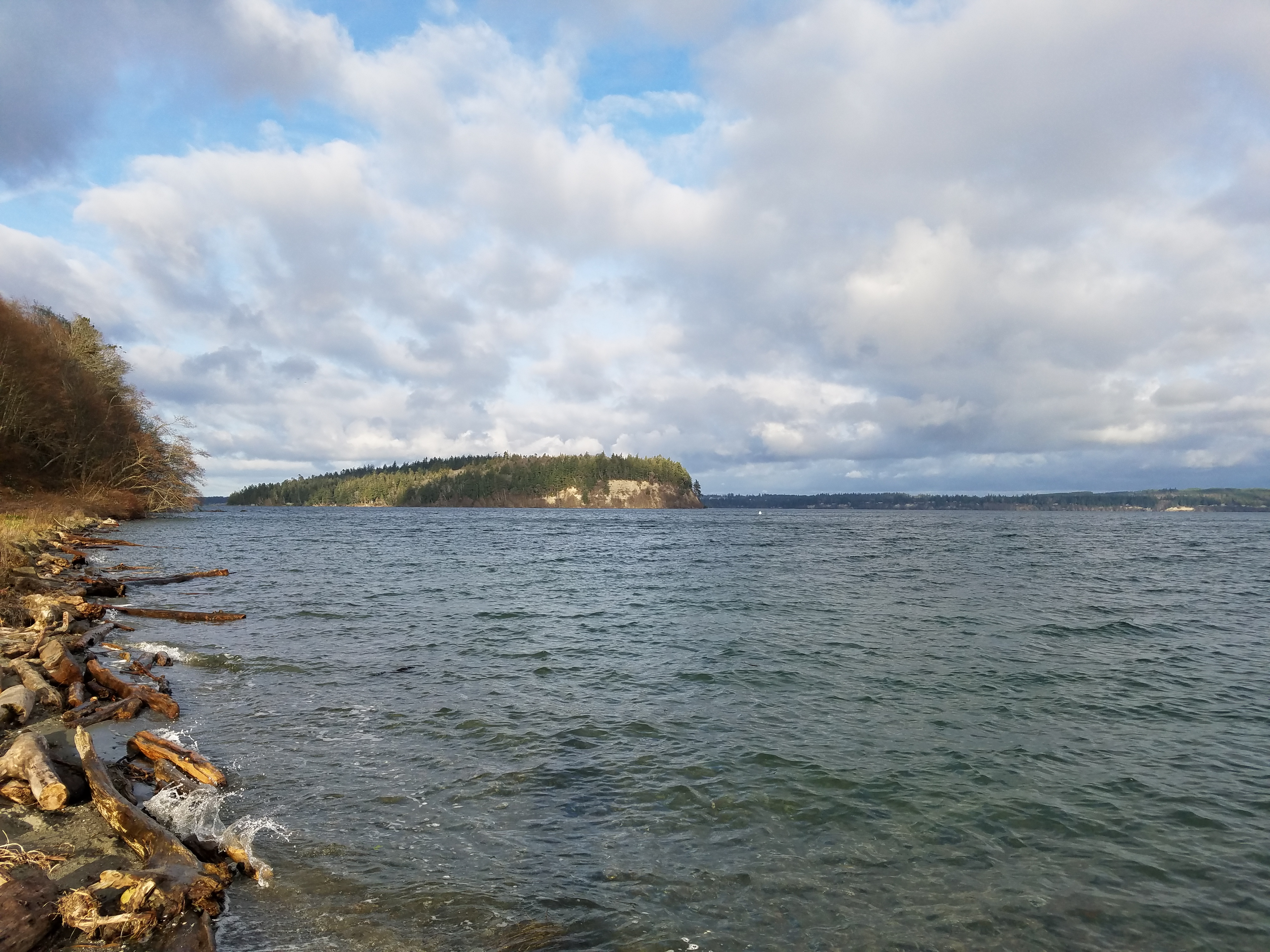
- View of Hood Head from the park at high tide

- Location within Washington (state) Location within the United States
- Location: Jefferson County, Washington, United States
- Coordinates: 47°53′03″N 122°38′00″W
- Area: 249 acres (101 ha)
- Elevation: 10 ft (3.0 m)
- Established: 1967
- Administrator: Washington State Parks and Recreation Commission
- Website: Official website

Shine Tidelands State Park is a 249-acre (101 ha) Washington state park located in Jefferson County, seven miles (11 km) south of Port Ludlow. The park has 5,000 feet (1,500 m) of shoreline on Bywater Bay adjacent to the west end of the Hood Canal Bridge and offers activities including picnicking, fishing, shellfish harvesting, beachcombing, birdwatching, windsurfing, and wildlife viewing. In 2014, the park was expanded to include the former Wolfe and Point Hannon properties.
