= Yakima Sportsman State Park =

State park in the U.S. state of Washington

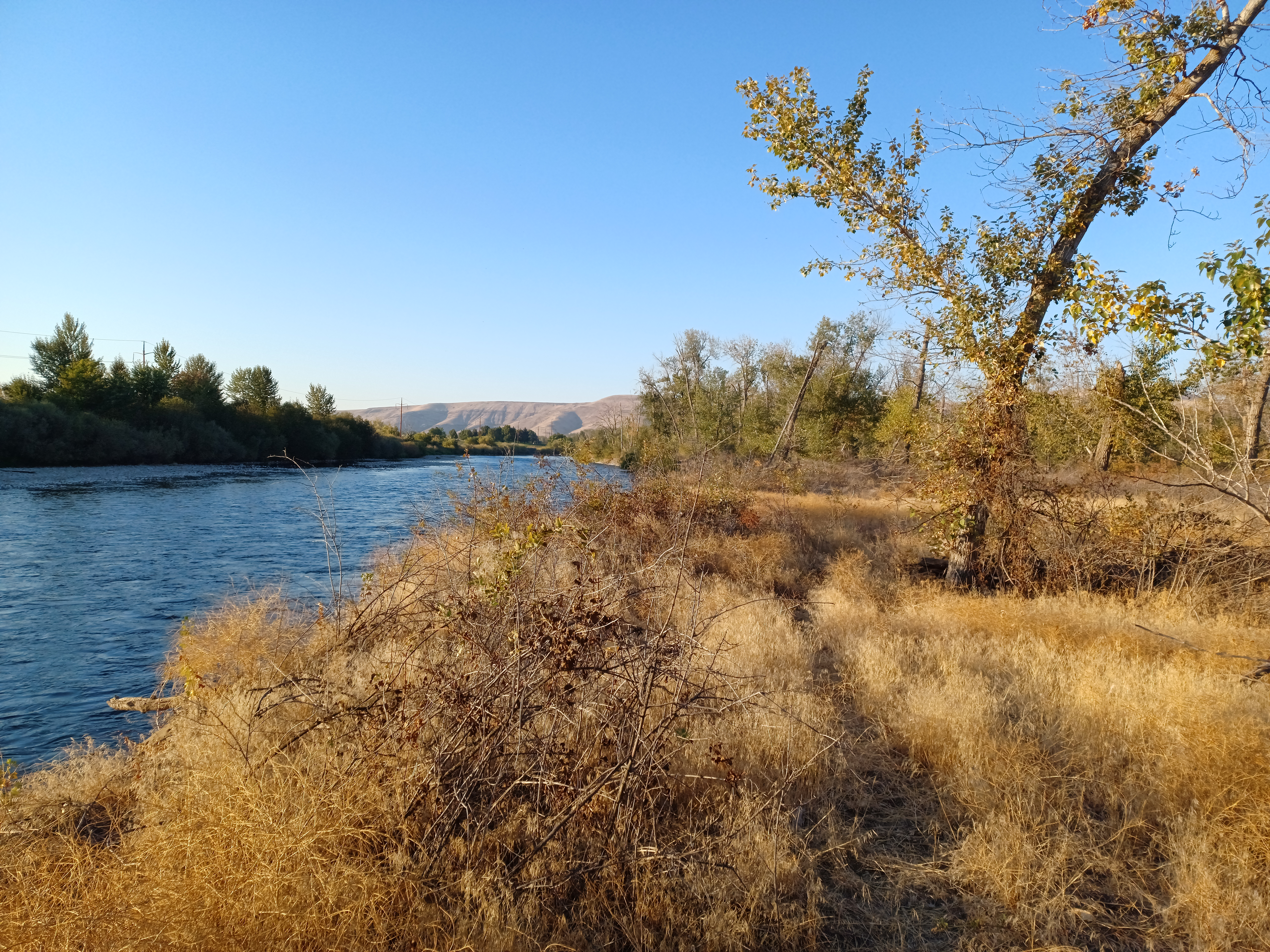
- Bank of Yakima River at the park

- Location within Washington (state) Location within the United States
- Location: Yakima County, Washington, United States
- Coordinates: 46°35′31″N 120°27′46″W
- Area: 266 acres (108 ha)
- Elevation: 1,014 ft (309 m)
- Established: 1945
- Administrator: Washington State Parks and Recreation Commission
- Visitors: 104,567 (in 2024)
- Website: Official website

Yakima Sportsman State Park is a public recreation area located on the Yakima River on the east side of the city of Yakima in Yakima County, Washington. The state park is an oasis of green in an otherwise desert region, encompassing 266 acres (108 ha) of Yakima River floodplain. The site was initially developed by the Yakima Valley Sportsman's Association in the early 1940s, then deeded to the state in 1945. Park offerings include camping, hiking, picnicking, fishing, and birdwatching.
