= Rasar State Park =

State park in Washington, United States

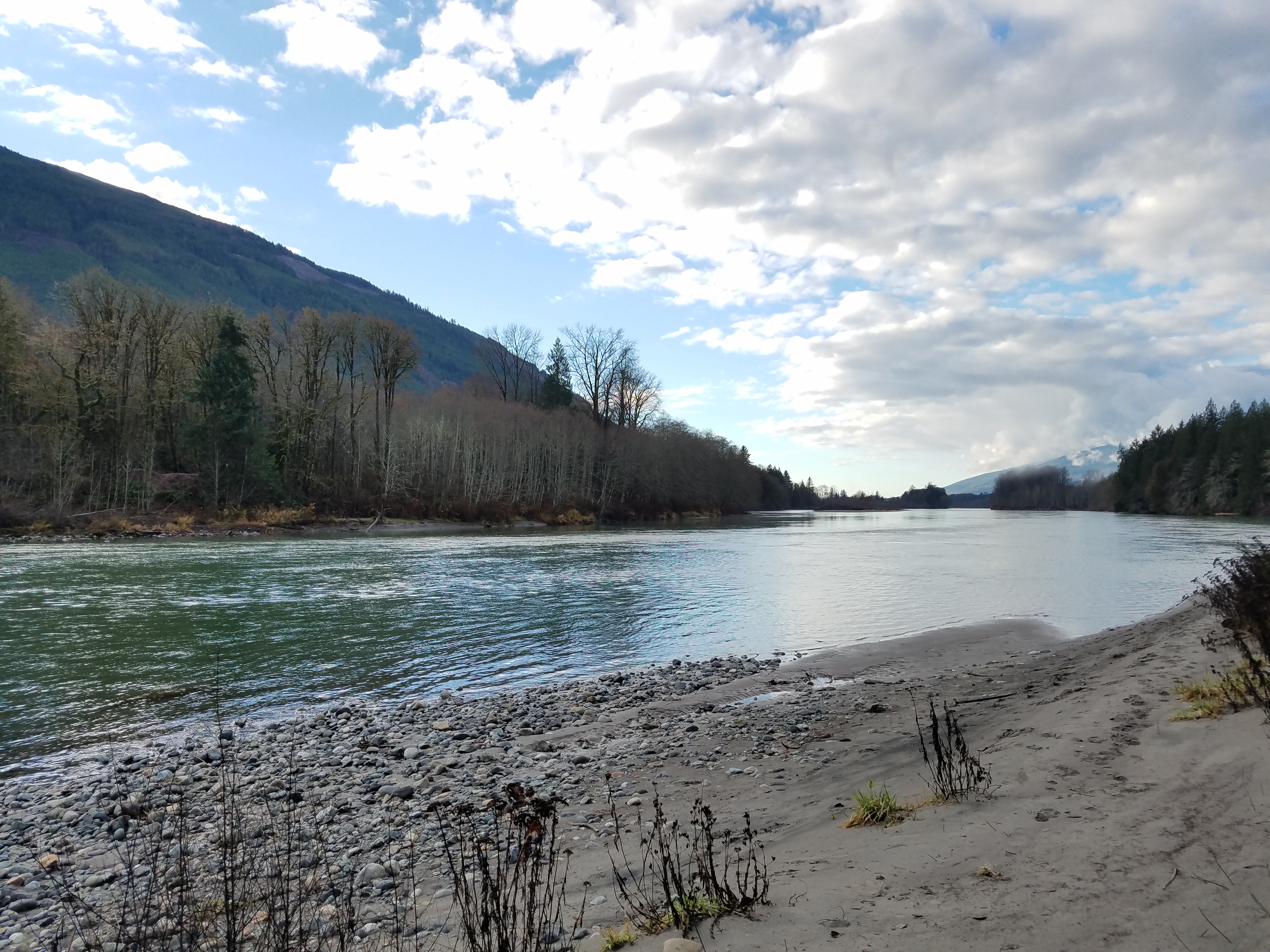
- The Skagit River from the park

- Location within Washington (state) Location within the United States
- Location: Skagit County, Washington, United States
- Coordinates: 48°31′00″N 121°54′14″W
- Area: 180 acres (73 ha)
- Established: 1986
- Administrator: Washington State Parks and Recreation Commission
- Visitors: 131,954 (in 2024)
- Named after: The Rasar family
- Website: Rasar State Park

Rasar State Park (/ˈreɪsər/ "racer") is a public recreation area located on the north bank of the Skagit River, eight miles (13 km) west of Concrete in Skagit County, Washington. The state park's 180 acres (73 ha) include 4,000 feet (1,200 m) of river shoreline; it is managed by the Washington State Parks and Recreation Commission.

== History ==
The park began with Daniel Rasar's donation of 120 acres (49 ha) for park use in 1984. The Nature Conservancy turned the land over to the state in 1986. An additional 40 acres (16 ha) located north of Cape Horn Road were acquired in 1990. Funding to develop the park was approved in 1991, with construction using locally found materials taking place from 1993 to 1997. The park was dedicated on July 12, 1997, and named for Peter Rasar, the first known member of the Rasar family to emigrate to the area.

== Activities and amenities ==
The park offers campsites and cabins, 3.7 miles (6.0 km) of hiking trails including 1 mile (1.6 km) of ADA-accessible trail, fishing, birdwatching, wildlife viewing, and interpretive activities.
