= Olmstead Place State Park =

State park in Washington (state), United States

Olmstead Place Historical State Park
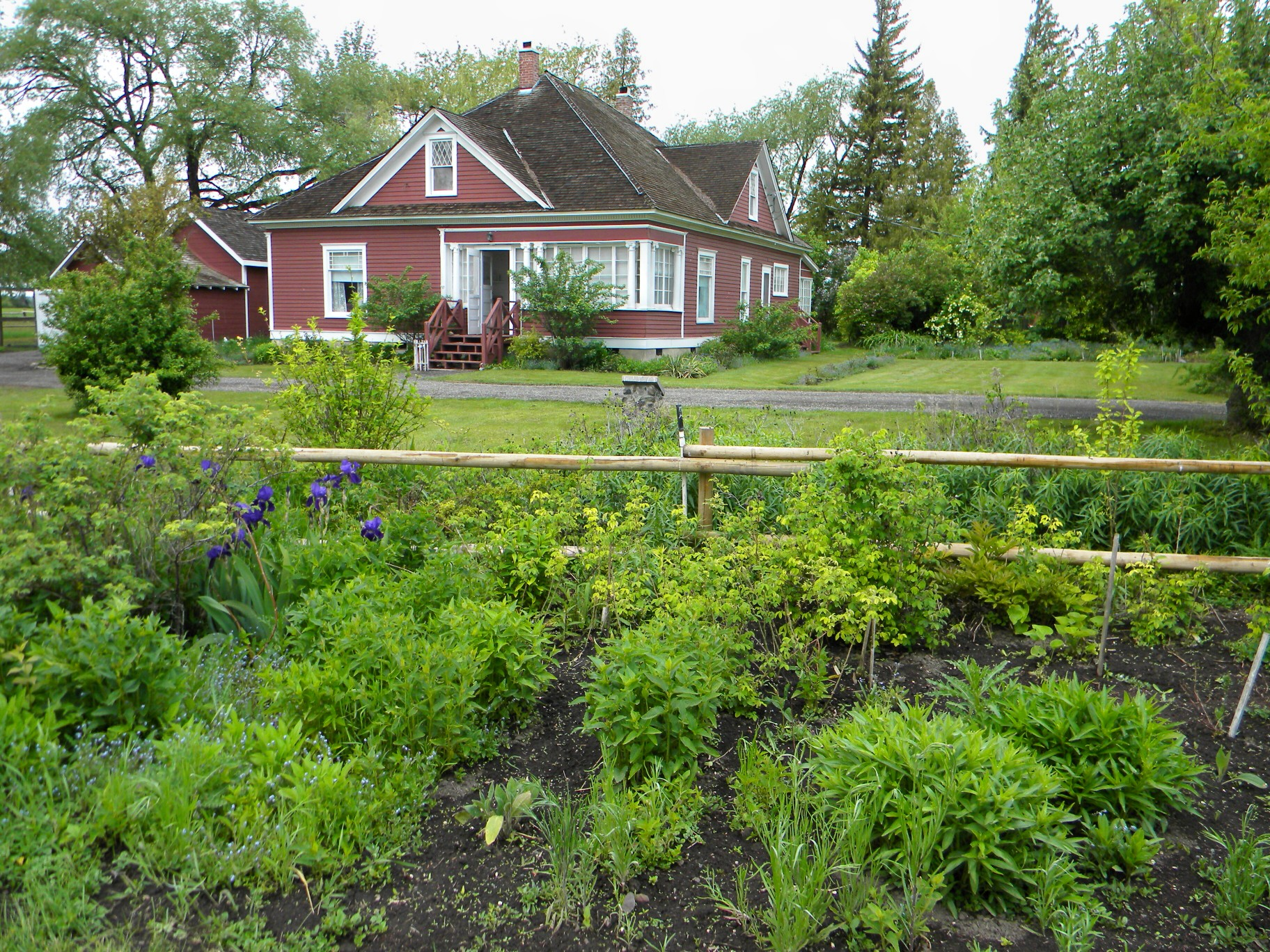

- Location within Washington (state) Location within the United States
- Location: Kittitas County, Washington, United States
- Coordinates: 46°58′13″N 120°28′19″W
- Area: 217 acres (88 ha)
- Elevation: 1,539 ft (469 m)
- Established: 1875 homestead; 1968 park
- Administrator: Washington State Parks and Recreation Commission
- Website: Official website
- Olmstead Place State Park
- U.S. National Register of Historic Places
- Location: 4 mi. east of Ellensburg near the Kittitas Hwy., Ellensburg, Kittitas County, Washington
- Nearest city: Ellensburg, Washington
- Area: 219 acres (89 ha)
- NRHP reference No.: 71000878
- Added to NRHP: March 31, 1971

Olmstead Place Historical State Park is a 217-acre (88 ha) Washington state park that preserves a working pioneer farm in Kittitas County. Park activities include picnicking, hiking, fishing, interpretive activities, wildlife viewing, and touring the living farm museum. The park was added to the National Register of Historic Places in 1971.
