= Brooks Memorial State Park =

State park in Washington (state), United States

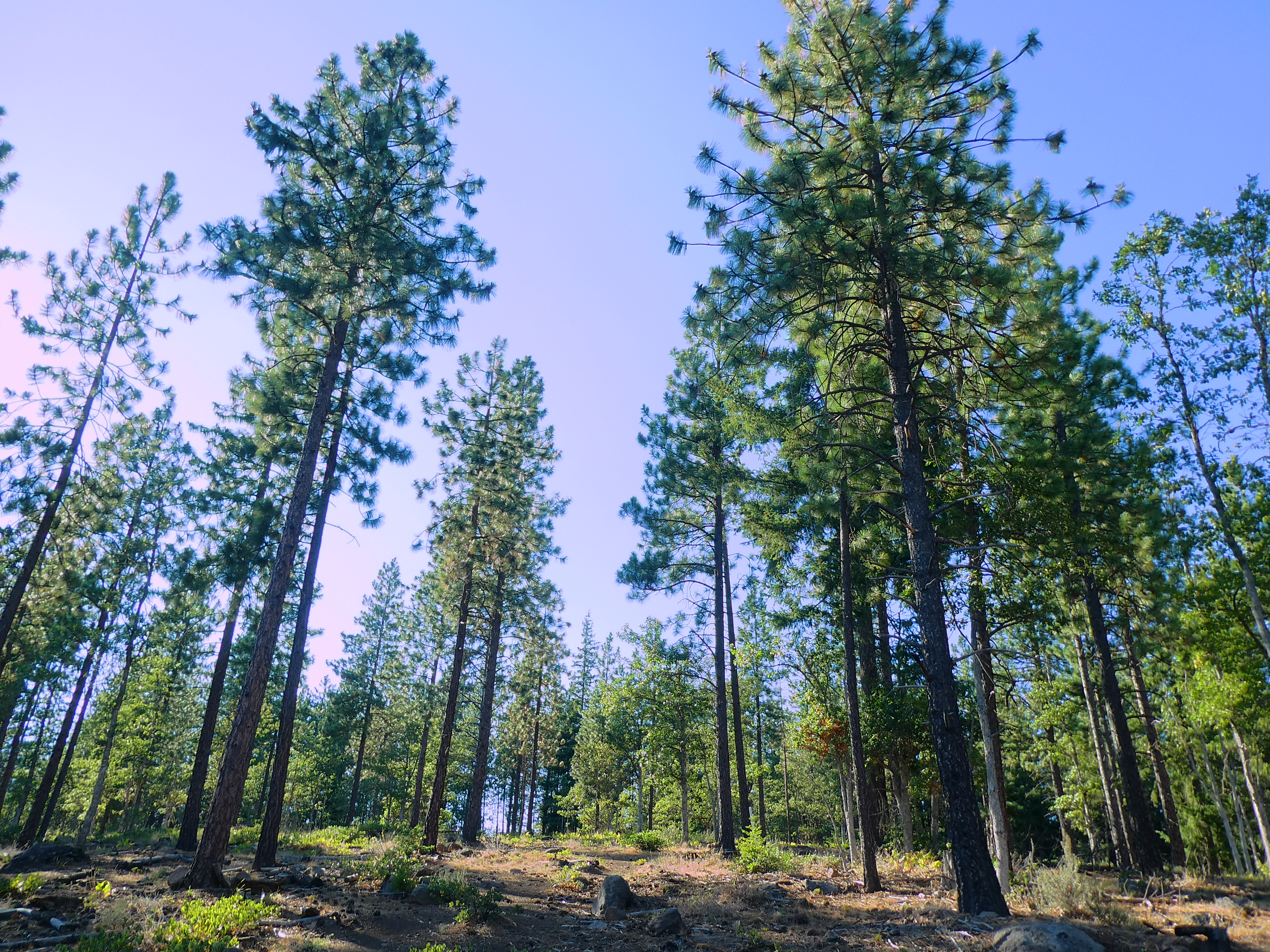
- Stands of ponderosa pine in the park

- Location within Washington (state) Location within the United States
- Interactive map of Brooks Memorial State Park
- Location: Klickitat County, Washington, United States
- Nearest city: Goldendale, Washington
- Coordinates: 45°57′01″N 120°39′57″W
- Area: 682 acres (276 ha)
- Elevation: 2,700 ft (820 m)
- Established: 1944
- Administrator: Washington State Parks and Recreation Commission
- Visitors: 66,129 (in 2024)
- Named for: Nelson B. Brooks
- Website: Official website

Brooks Memorial State Park is a public recreation area in the southern Cascade Mountains located eleven miles (18 km) northeast of Goldendale, Washington. The 682-acre (276 ha) state park features nine miles (14 km) of hiking and equestrian trails through ponderosa pine forest along a prong of the Little Klickitat River as well as camping, picnicking, wildlife viewing, and an environmental learning center, the Brooks Memorial Retreat Center. The park also contains a disc golf course in the forest that was established in 2017.

== History ==
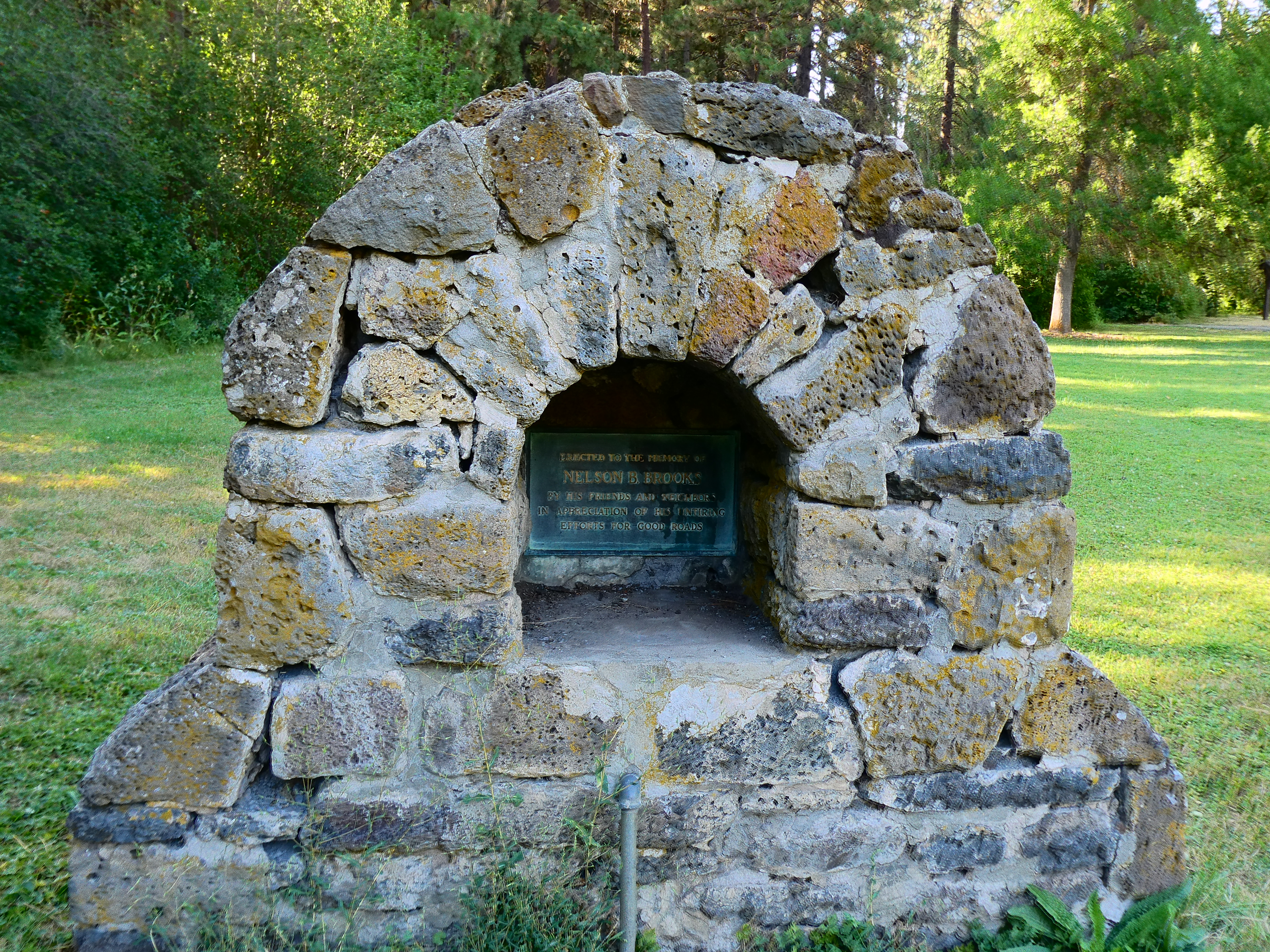
Park memorial dedicated to Brooks

The park was established after the state acquired six parcels of land between 1944 and 1957. The park was named in honor of Judge Nelson B. Brooks (1858-1928), a local administrator who was noted for establishing and improving roads in Klickitat County in the late 19th and early 20th centuries.
