= Kopachuck State Park =

State park in Washington State, USA

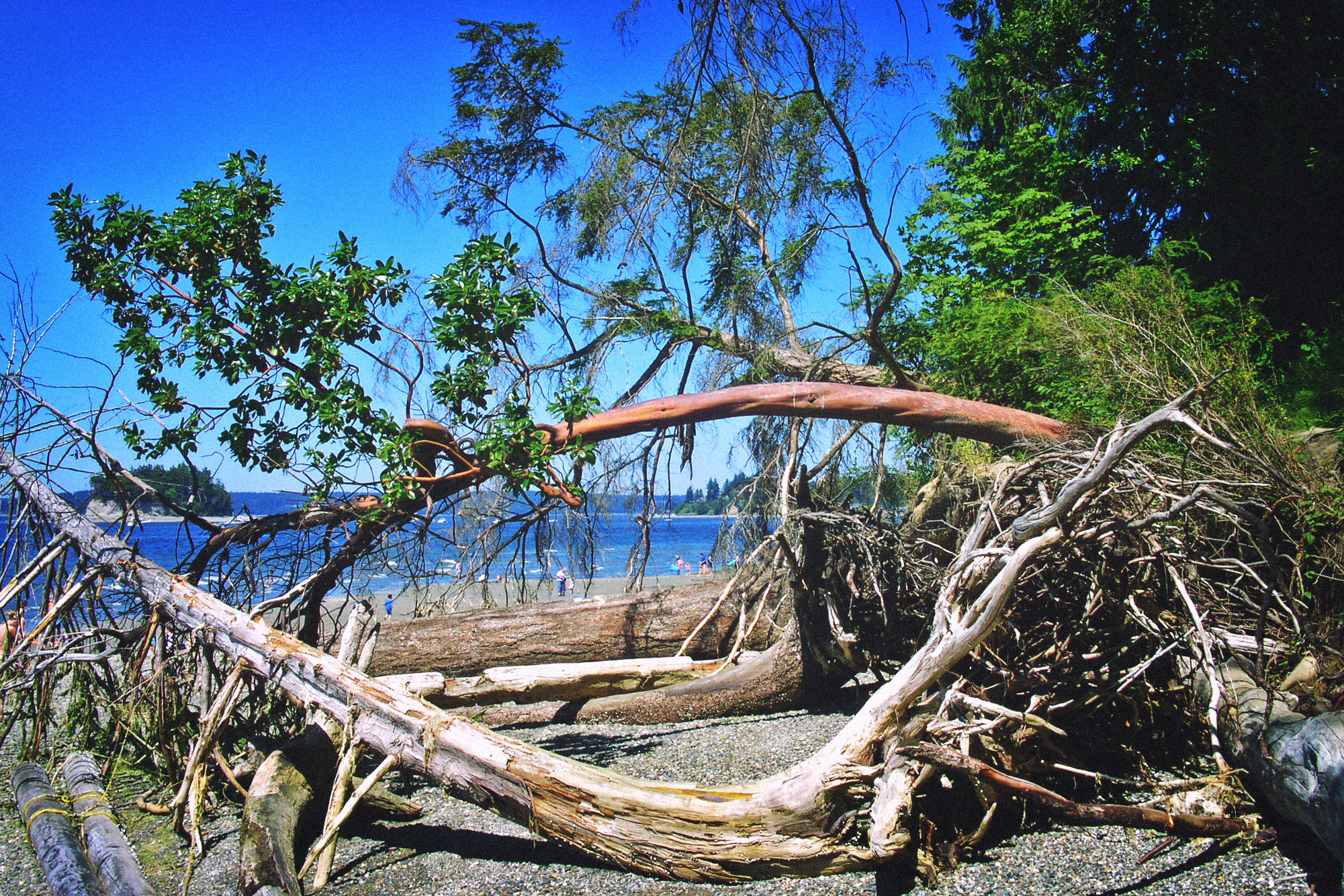

- Location within Washington (state) Location within the United States
- Location: Pierce County, Washington, United States
- Coordinates: 47°18′29″N 122°40′49″W
- Area: 109 acres (44 ha)
- Elevation: 52 ft (16 m)
- Established: 1955
- Administrator: Washington State Parks and Recreation Commission
- Visitors: 34,979 (in 2024)
- Website: Official website

Kopachuck State Park is a publicly owned recreation area situated on Henderson Bay in Puget Sound, about 6 miles (9.7 km) west of the city of Gig Harbor, Washington. The state park's 109 acres (44 ha) encompass over a mile of saltwater shoreline. The park provides sweeping views of sunsets, the Olympic Mountains and Puget Sound. Cutts Island, known locally as "Deadman's Island," which lies about a half-mile from the park shore, is reachable by boat. Both Kopachuck and Cutts Island are administered by the Washington State Parks and Recreation Commission.

== History ==
The park's name is a constructed compound of two Chinook Jargon words: kopa meaning "at, on" and chuck meaning "water." The name was chosen by the Washington State Parks and Recreation Commission in 1958. The Squaxin Island, Puyallup, and Nisqually Indian Tribes used the area around the park for seasonal fishing and clam gatherings. The park was logged at the start of the 20th century, resulting in the second-growth forest present today. The park was first leased by the Washington State Parks and Recreation Commission in 1955, opening to the public in 1960.

2009 proposed closure

Kopachuck was tagged for closure in 2009 by Washington Governor Chris Gregoire as part of budget cutbacks in the wake of hard economic times, prompting neighbors to rally to save the park.

Diseased trees

In 2011, it was found that many of the park's Douglas firs were diseased with laminated tree rot, one of the deadliest diseases a fir tree can contract. The campground was closed by park rangers soon after; the closure became permanent in 2014. In September 2011, many of the diseased trees were cut down due to increasingly urgent safety issues. In response, local artists created "Intertwined — Requiem for the Trees," which the artists said was to record the trees before their death. The piece was displayed in the Gig Harbor History Museum for a short time that fall.

== Activities and amenities ==
Recreational activities include swimming and kayaking. The normally steep rocky beach becomes a level sandbar at low tide and is a popular place for kids to play in the sand. The park offers kitchen shelters, 16 sheltered and 76 unsheltered picnic tables, and two miles of hiking trails. The campground has been permanently closed.

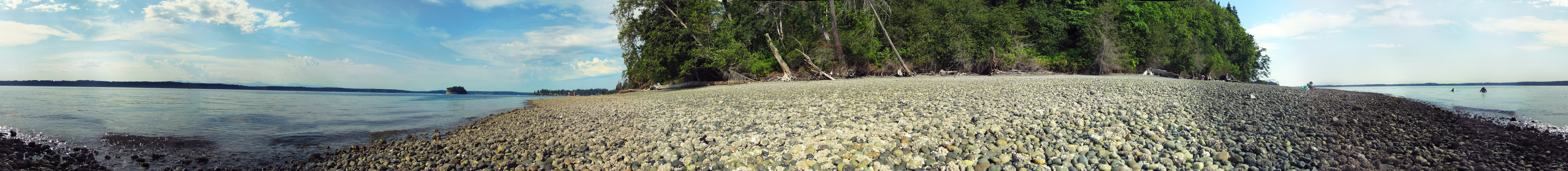
360° Panorama of Kopachuck State Park in late July on a sunny afternoon. Beachgoers play in the tide and on the beach while off in the distance are sights of the Olympic Mountains and Cutts Island.
