= Bottle Beach State Park =

State park in the U.S. state of Washington

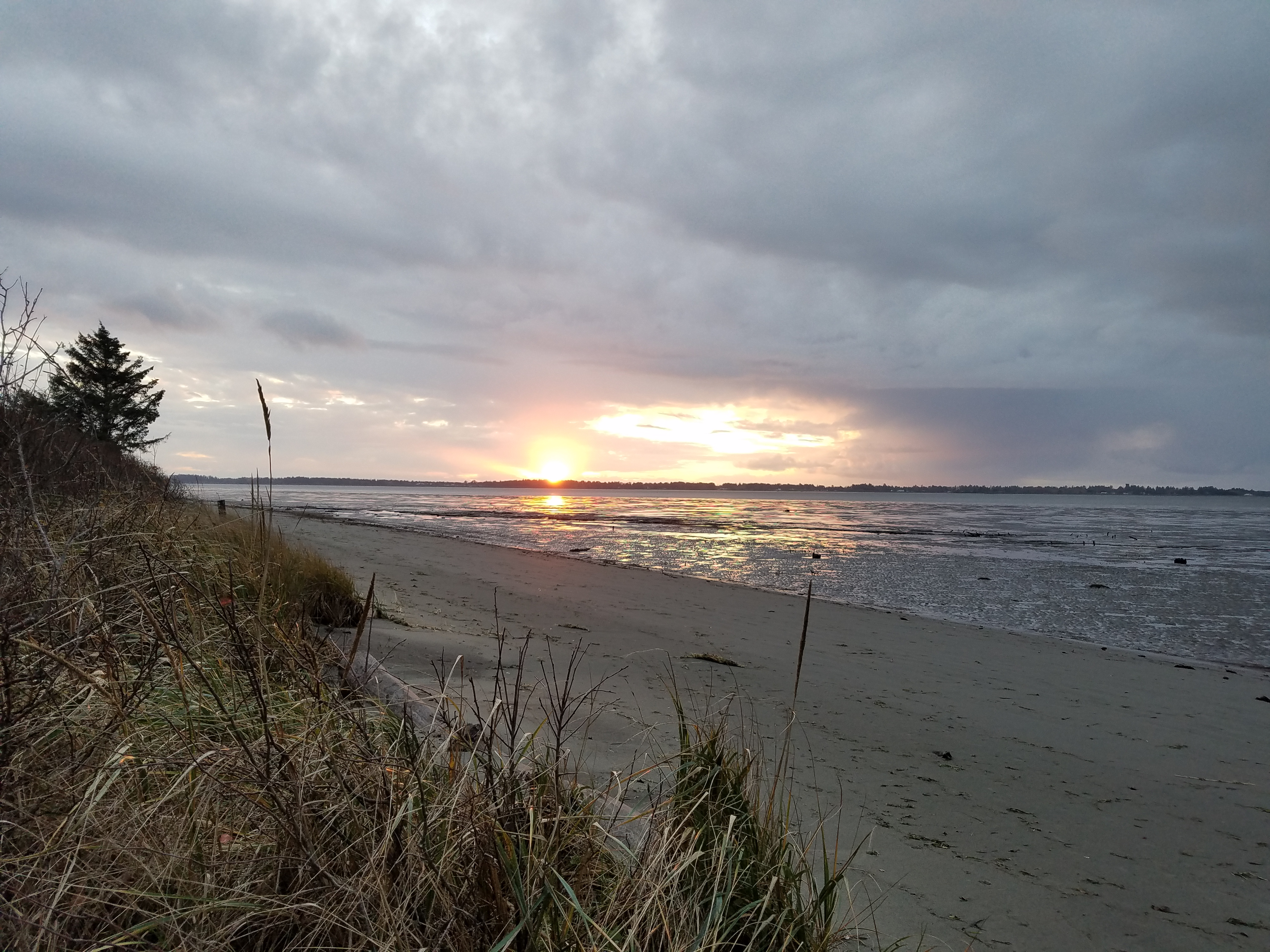
- Tide flats at Bottle Beach

- Location within Washington (state) Location within the United States
- Interactive map of Bottle Beach State Park
- Location: Grays Harbor County, Washington, United States
- Coordinates: 46°53′43″N 124°02′24″W
- Area: 64 acres (26 ha)
- Elevation: 13 ft (4.0 m)
- Established: 1993
- Administrator: Washington State Parks and Recreation Commission
- Website: Official website

Bottle Beach State Park is a public recreation area on the southern shore of Grays Harbor in Grays Harbor County, Washington. The 64-acre (26 ha) state park consists mainly of tide flats with 6,000 feet (1,800 m) of shoreline near the historic townsite of Ocosta. It was created at the urging of birding experts Bob Morse and Ruby Egbert, who personally donated funds for land purchases at the site in 1993 and for whom the park's Ruby Egbert Natural Area is named. The park opened in 1995. Activities include hiking, birdwatching, and wildlife viewing.
