= Squilchuck State Park =

State park in Washington (state), United States

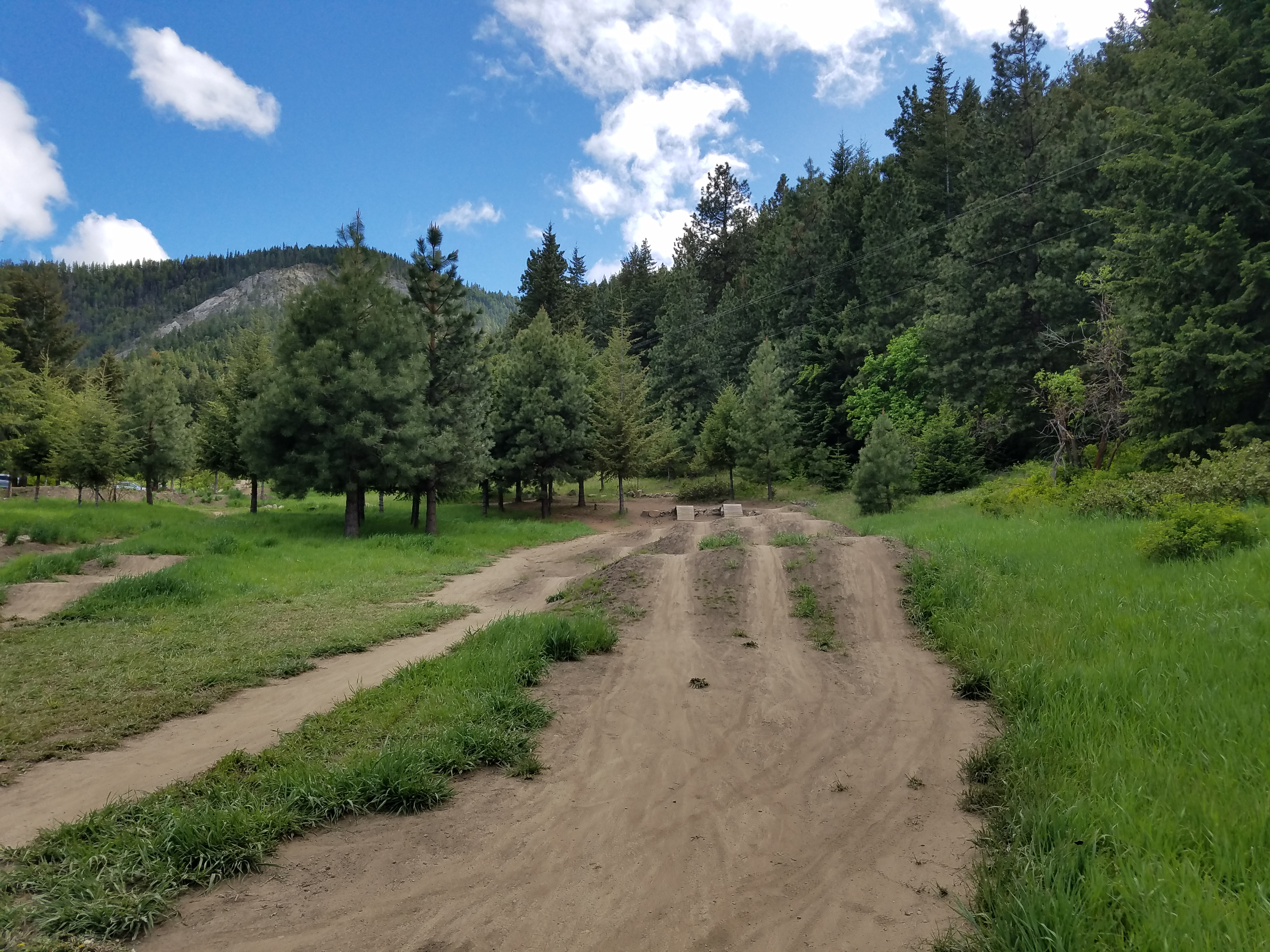
- Mountain bike trails at Squilchuck

- Location within Washington (state) Location within the United States
- Location: Chelan County, Washington, United States
- Coordinates: 47°18′31″N 120°22′26″W
- Area: 249 acres (101 ha)
- Elevation: 3,146 ft (959 m)
- Established: 1952
- Administrator: Washington State Parks and Recreation Commission
- Website: Official website

Squilchuck State Park is a public recreation area located below Mission Ridge eight miles (13 km) south of Wenatchee in Chelan County, Washington. The 249-acre (101 ha) state park offers hiking, mountain biking and cross-country ski trails, group camping, birdwatching, and wildlife viewing. The park's Squilchuck Lodge is used for group gatherings.
