= Blind Bay (Washington) =

Small bay in Washington, U.S.

Coordinates: 48.579268°N 122.936292°W

Blind Bay is a small bay on Shaw Island in San Juan County, Washington. On an island near its mouth is Blind Island State Park.
