= Peshastin Pinnacles State Park =

State park in Washington (state), United States

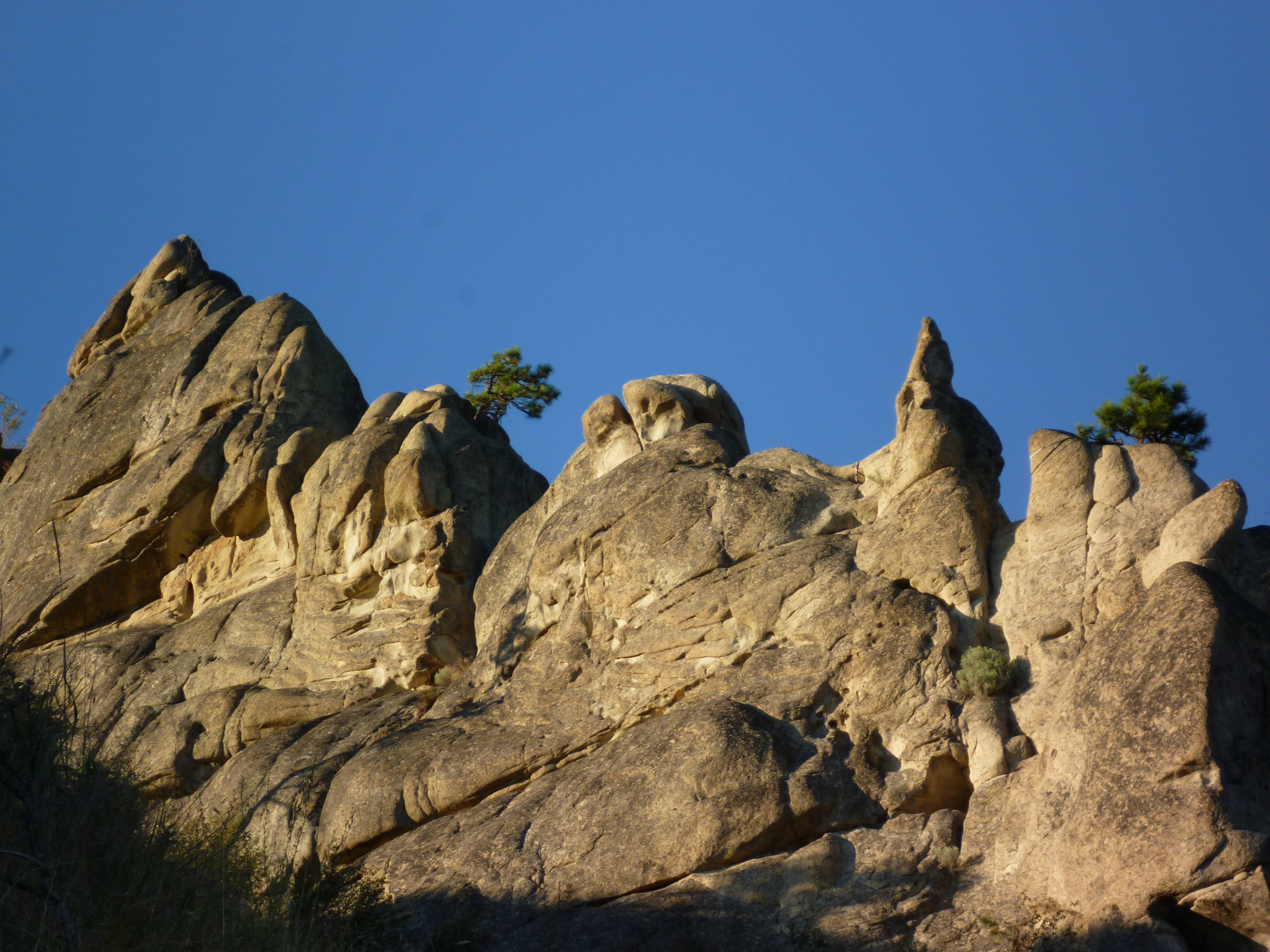

- Location within Washington (state) Location within the United States
- Location: Chelan County, Washington, United States
- Coordinates: 47°32′29″N 120°31′14″W
- Area: 34 acres (14 ha)
- Elevation: 1,286 ft (392 m)
- Established: 1991
- Administrator: Washington State Parks and Recreation Commission
- Website: Official website

Peshastin Pinnacles State Park is a 34-acre (14 ha) public recreation area located three miles (4.8 km) northwest of Cashmere in Chelan County, Washington. The state park features sandstone slabs and spires in a desert environment with views of the surrounding orchards, Enchantment Range, and Wenatchee Valley. Park activities include rock climbing, hiking, birdwatching, and wildlife viewing.

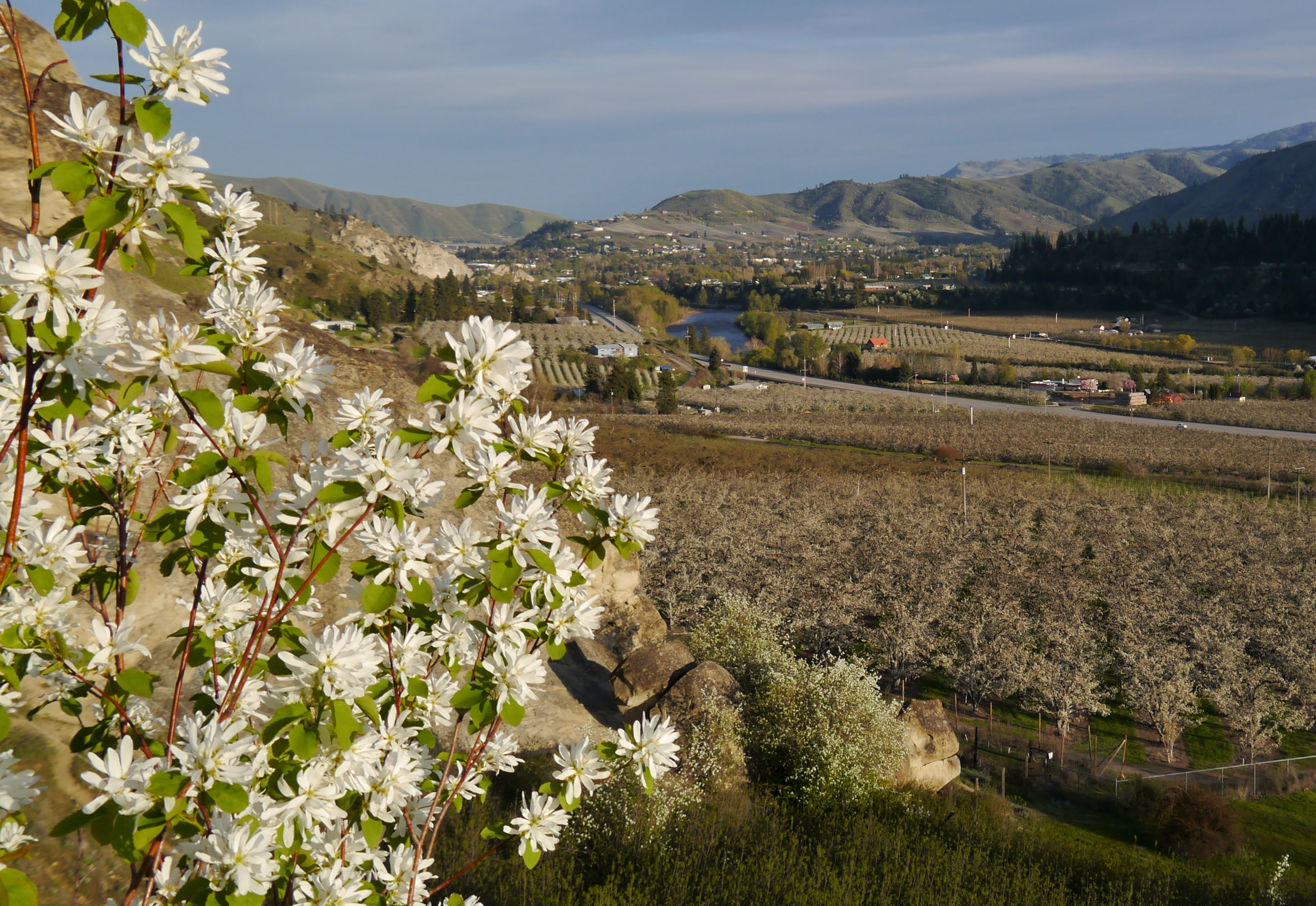
Amelanchier cusickii at Peshastin Pinnacles State Park, a native fruit in the same family as the orchard trees blooming in the valley below.
