= Massacre Bay (Washington) =

Coordinates: 48.6337134°N 122.9818498°W

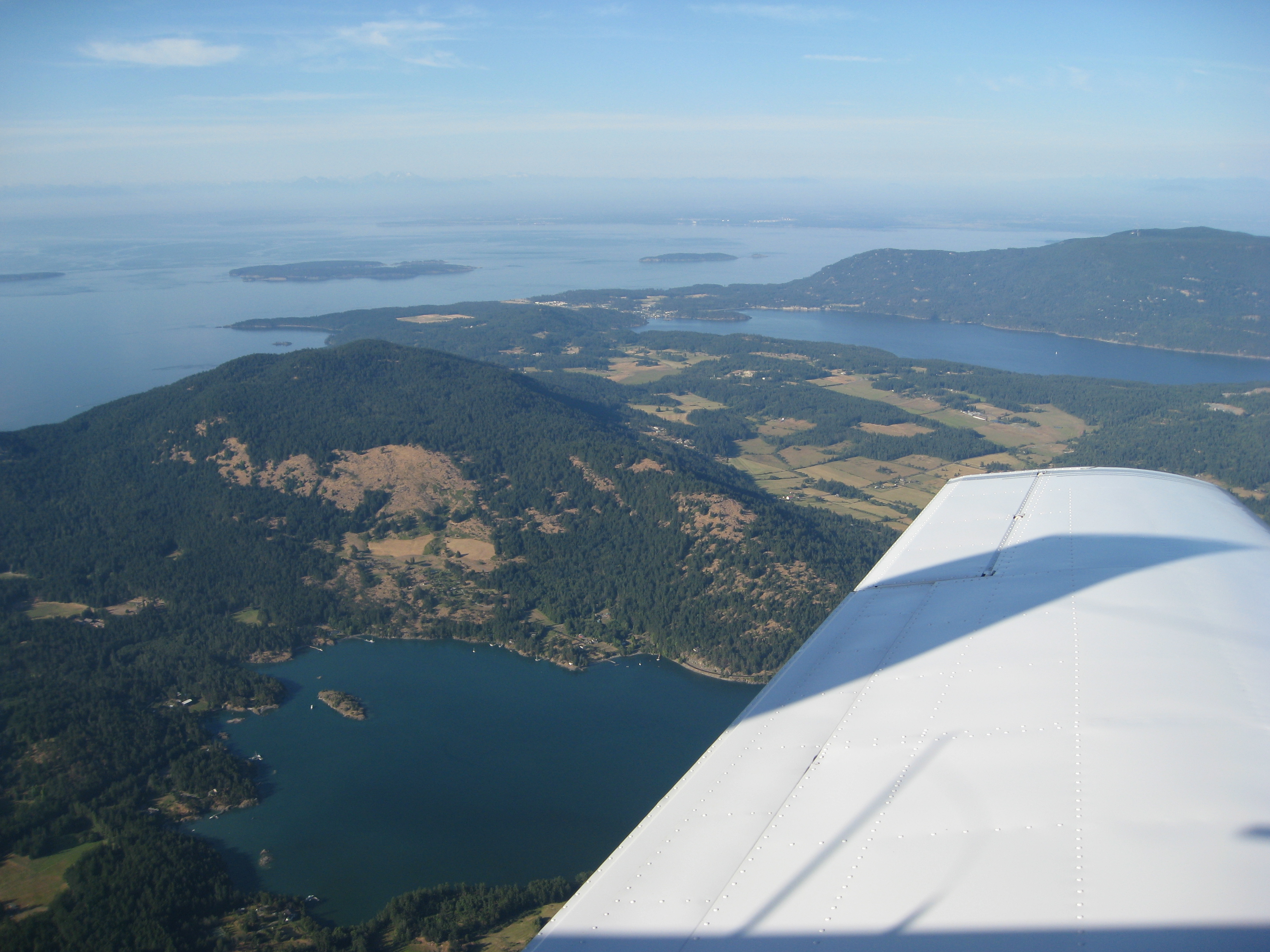
Aerial image of Massacre Bay

Massacre Bay is a bay in the U.S. state of Washington.

Massacre Bay was named for the fact that British explorers found evidence that Indian massacres occurred in the area.
