= Carr Inlet =

Arm of water in Puget Sound in the U.S. state of Washington

Coordinates: 47°15′25.2″N 122°40′50.3″W

Carr Inlet, in southern Puget Sound in the U.S. state of Washington, is an arm of water between Key Peninsula and Gig Harbor Peninsula. Its southern end is connected to the southern basin of Puget Sound. Northward, it separates McNeil Island and Fox Island. The northern end of Carr Inlet is named Henderson Bay, which feeds into Burley Lagoon.

Carr Inlet was named by Charles Wilkes during the Wilkes Expedition of 1838–1842, to honor Overton Carr, one of the expedition's officers.
