= Cascadia Marine Trail =

Water trail in Washington, United States

The Cascadia Marine Trail is a 150-mile (240 km) water trail on Puget Sound.

Created in 1993, it is designated as one of the 16 National Millennium Trails and suitable for day or multi-day trips. It has over 50 campsites to visit. People can boat to the campsites from many public and private launch sites or shoreline trailheads. In 1994, it was designated a National Recreation Trail.
