= Blaine Wetzel =

American fine dining chef (born 1986)

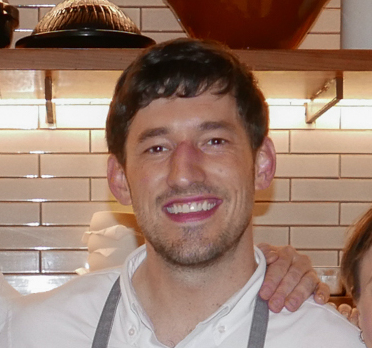
- Blaine Wetzel in 2018
- Born: March 1986 (age 40)
- Spouse: Daniela Soto-Innes
- Culinary career
- Rating: AAA Motor Club
- Previous restaurant: Willows Inn
- Awards won: Food & Wine Best New Chefs (2012); James Beard Rising Star Chef Award (2014); James Beard Award for Best Chef Northwest (2015)

Blaine Wetzel (born 1986) is an American fine dining chef. He is known for being head chef at the Willows Inn on Lummi Island, Washington, from 2010 to 2022. He was hired to run the restaurant of the bed and breakfast on the remote island accessible only by ferry after working as a chef under René Redzepi at Noma, and at the Willows Inn he focused on hyper-local Pacific Northwest ingredients served in a multi-course tasting menu. Shortly after Wetzel's arrival, the Willows Inn was described by The New York Times as one of 10 restaurants worth a plane trip. Wetzel's acclaim grew as the Willows Inn became an internationally known destination restaurant, and he won awards from the James Beard Foundation and Food & Wine and was invited to be a guest chef at other prominent restaurants. In 2021, the restaurant's reputation was damaged by allegations from several former employees published in The New York Times that the Willows Inn presented non-local ingredients as local to Lummi Island and that Wetzel used derogatory and abusive language and tolerated sexual harassment at the restaurant, allegations that Wetzel denied. In 2022, in the wake of the allegations and settlements by the restaurant of claims of wage theft, the Willows Inn closed permanently.

== Early life and training ==
Wetzel is a Washington native and grew up as a skate punk in Olympia, where he often ate salmon and shellfish. He did not attend college and began training as a chef following high school. He first worked at a steakhouse next to a Walmart before taking jobs at Alex in Las Vegas and La Berge Carmel and Manresa in California, and finally going to Copenhagen (initially as a volunteer) to work at Noma. Wetzel spent two years at Noma as chef de partie.

== Willows Inn ==
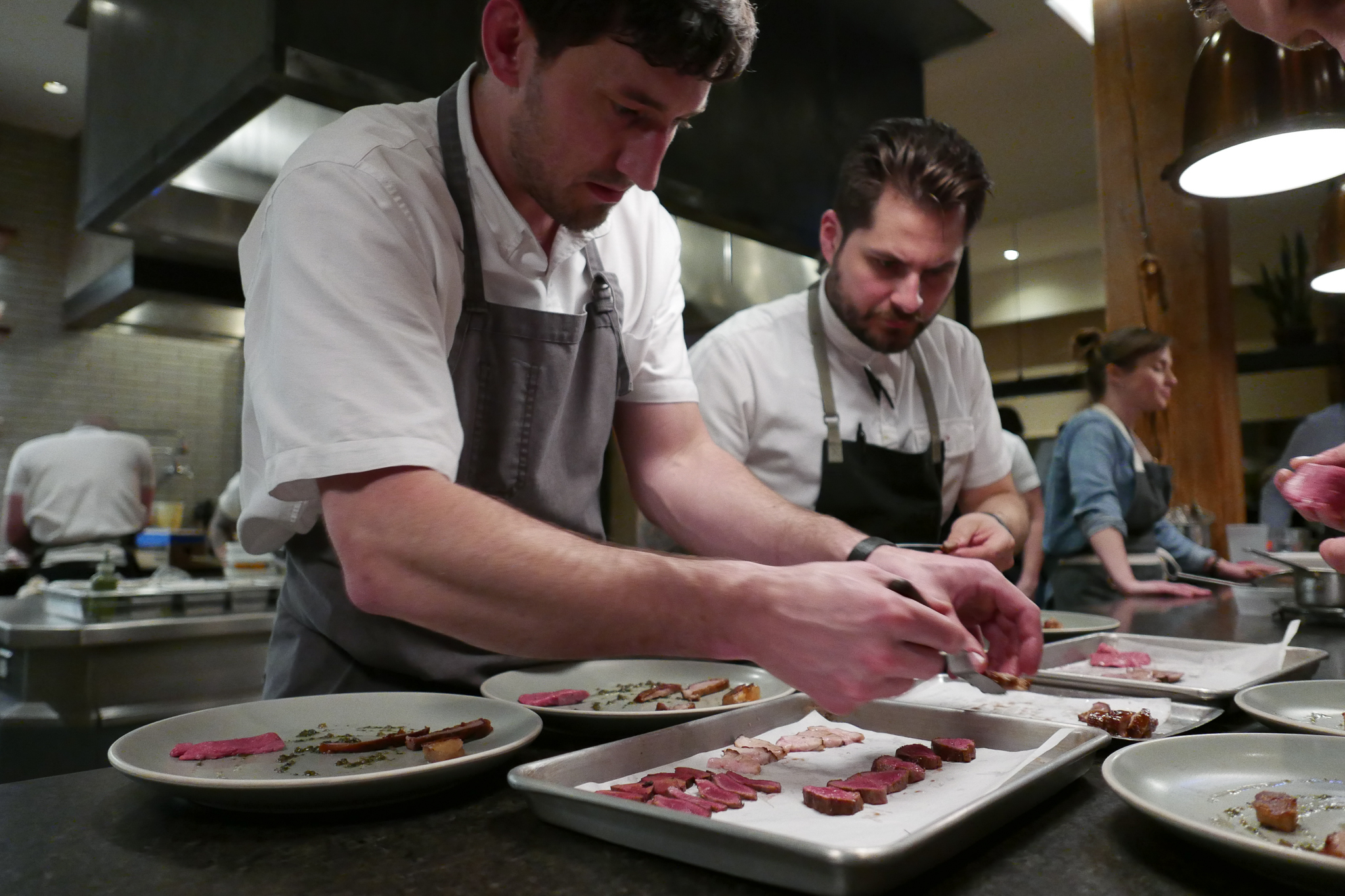
Blaine Wetzel (left) cooks for a collaboration dinner at Smyth in Chicago, May 2018.

In 2010, Riley Starks, the owner of the Willows Inn, placed a Craigslist ad seeking a new chef. Wetzel, then 24, responded with a 1,000-word cover letter pitching Starks on "a small chef-driven kitchen with the emphasis on the garden." Starks hired Wetzel, who planned a menu that would incorporate local salmon, Lummi Island's many varieties of berries, seaweeds and beach plants, local shellfish and produce from Starks' organic farm. Working alone in the kitchen, Wetzel began serving five-course meals with a single nightly seating in the fall of 2010. Wetzel's reputation as a former Noma chef brought the inn its best autumn under Starks' ownership, Starks said. The inn closed in January 2011 for a three-month renovation. That month, The New York Times described it as one of "10 restaurants worth a plane ride," noting that despite its two-hour distance (with ferry connection) from Seattle, "it is about to become a destination restaurant."

The restaurant re-opened in March 2011 with an 18-course tasting menu priced at $85. Wetzel later became a co-owner of the Willows Inn.

The Willows Inn was known for purportedly hyperlocal Pacific Northwest cuisine, with news reports describing the ingredients as sourced "almost exclusively" from Lummi Island and reporting that the staff "grow, forage, cook and serve everything. The only thing they buy commercially is oil and salt." Wetzel and his fellow chefs could be seen on Lummi Island foraging for ingredients. Wetzel also reproduced Noma's presentation style, with "unconventional vessels" and dishes delivered to the table by the chefs themselves.

Despite the acclaim, Wetzel's management of the Willows Inn was the subject of numerous controversies starting in 2017, with a U.S. Department of Labor investigation and settlement over wage theft claims due to the Willows Inn's staging program for trainees.

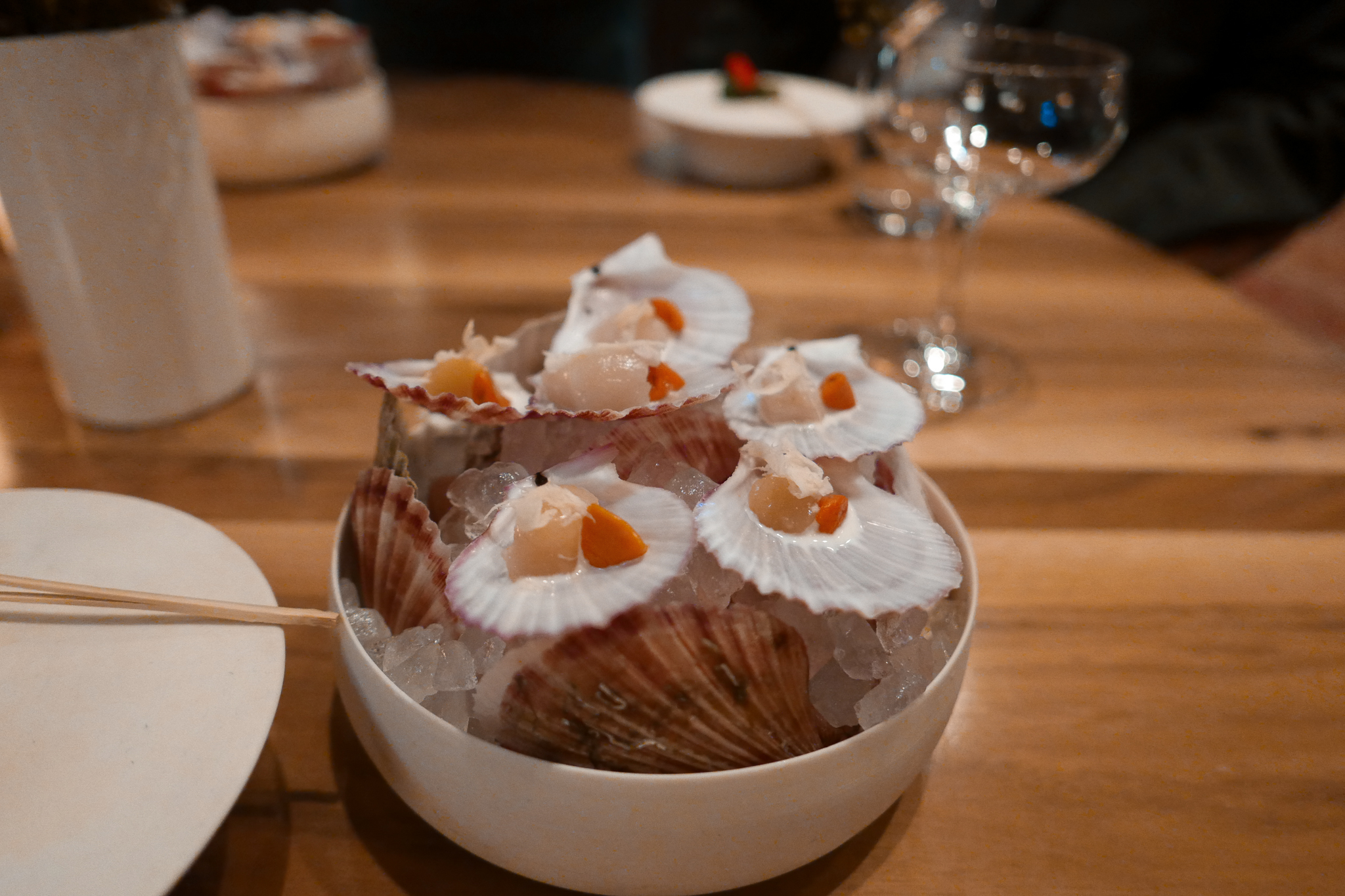
Wetzel's pink scallops dish photographed in 2018.

The New York Times in April 2021 published a lengthy article quoting 35 former Willows Inn employees who alleged that the restaurant often used non-local foods and obscured their true origins, that Wetzel verbally abused and intimidated employees and that male staff members sexually harassed female employees. According to the Times, employees said that "most ingredients were ordered from distributors and farms on the mainland. When local produce ran out, cooks routinely bought supermarket ingredients, like beets and broccoli, that were then passed off as grown or gathered on Lummi." One signature chicken dish was made with chickens purchased from Costco, the Times said. A former line cook reported cutting frozen Alaskan scallops "down to the shape and size of pink singing scallops."

Employees reported that Wetzel used derogatory and racist language. Wetzel "denied the substance of most allegations," according to the Times. The Times reported that former employees tolerated Wetzel's alleged behavior because a recommendation from him could open doors for many cooking jobs. Female employees also claimed that male staff members harassed them with "sexual overtures and innuendo." Although they did not allege that Wetzel himself engaged in this activity, they said that Wetzel was present at events where underage staff drank alcohol, which Wetzel also denied. After the article appeared, the 2017 class action lawsuit was amended to include 137 employees at the Willows Inn from 2018 to 2022 who alleged wage theft and lack of required breaks. This amended lawsuit was settled for $1.37 million, with three additional cases settled by November 2022.

The Willows Inn was one of several restaurants that inspired the satirical 2022 horror comedy The Menu, in which a fictional destination restaurant offering an expensive tasting menu is located on a Pacific Northwest island reached only by boat. In November 2022, the Willows Inn permanently closed.

== Other culinary activities ==
In addition to his work at the Willows Inn, Wetzel has been a guest chef at Mirazur in Menton. He collaborated with Kyle Connaughton of SingleThread Farm in California and John Shields of Smyth in Chicago on a series of collaborative dinners held in each other's restaurants.

In 2020, Wetzel explored opening a new restaurant in Los Angeles.

== Book ==
Wetzel is the author of Sea and Smoke: Flavors from the Untamed Pacific Northwest (with Joe Ray, Running Press, 2015) and Lummi: Island Cooking (Prestel, 2020). The Seattle Times described the former book as both cookbook and memoir. In the Los Angeles Times, Bill Addison said Lummi's "recipes really speak to other chefs" and that the book offers "heady escapism."

== Personal life ==
Wetzel was in a long-term relationship with Raquel Ruiz Diaz, whom he met in culinary school and who managed the Willows Inn until 2017.

Wetzel met fellow chef Daniela Soto-Innes while in Bilbao in 2018 for an awards program. They began dating and became engaged in March 2019 and, according to Soto-Innes' Instagram feed, married in January 2020. Soto-Innes worked alongside Wetzel at the Willows Inn before its closure in 2022 and added Mexican elements to the inn's menu.

In 2022, Soto-Innes announced that she and Wetzel would open a restaurant in Nayarit, Mexico, although Wetzel later stated that the project was solely that of Soto-Innes.
