= Willows Inn =

American fine dining bed and breakfast

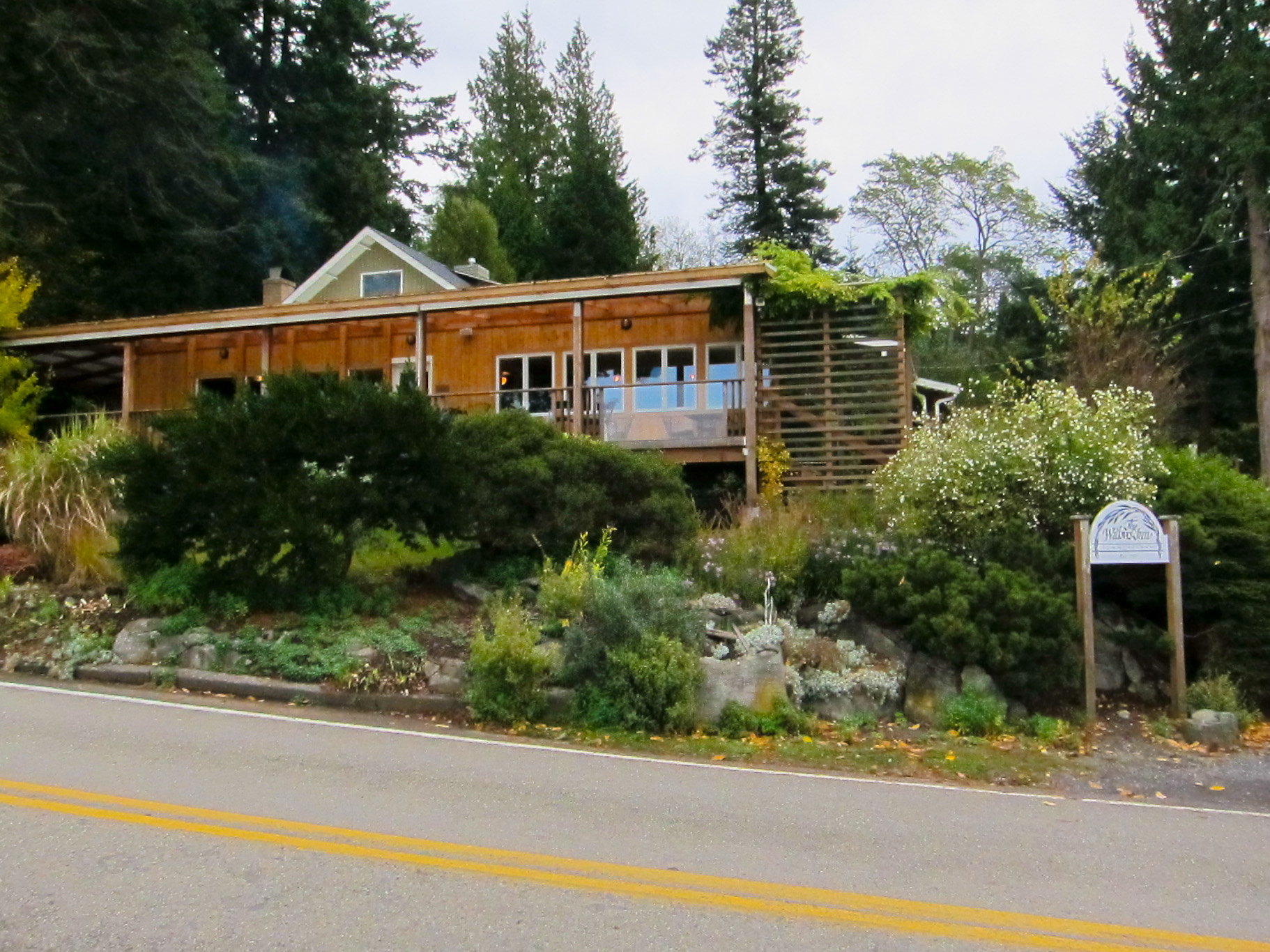
- Willows Inn photographed in 2012
- Interactive map of Willows Inn

Restaurant information
- Established: c. 1910
- Closed: 2022
- Previous owners: Frank and Ruby Taft; Gary and Victoria Flynn; Riley Starks; Tim and Marcia McEvoy; Blaine Wetzel
- Head chef: Blaine Wetzel
- Food type: Fine dining; Local food; Pacific Northwest cuisine
- Location: 2579 West Shore Drive, Lummi Island, Washington, 98262, United States
- Coordinates: 48.7355°N 122.7187°W
- Website: willows-inn.com

The Willows Inn was an American fine dining restaurant and bed and breakfast inn on Lummi Island, Washington, United States. It operated on and off from 1910 to 2010 as a small regional beach resort and bed and breakfast. Starting in 2010, under chef Blaine Wetzel, who had worked for René Redzepi at Noma, the Willows Inn became known worldwide as a destination restaurant serving purportedly hyperlocal cuisine fished, grown or foraged on or around Lummi Island. It was described in 2011 by The New York Times as one of 10 restaurants worth a plane trip. As Wetzel won awards from the James Beard Foundation and Food & Wine, the Willows Inn's reputation for high-quality local ingredients, Pacific Northwest flavors and meticulous service and presentation grew.

In 2021, however, the restaurant's reputation was damaged by allegations published by The New York Times that the restaurant presented non-local ingredients as local to Lummi Island and that Wetzel used derogatory and abusive language and tolerated sexual harassment at the restaurant, allegations Wetzel denied. In addition to the allegations reported by the Times, the restaurant also settled claims of wage theft. In 2022, the Willows Inn closed permanently. It was one of several destination restaurants that inspired the fictional restaurant in the satirical 2022 horror comedy film The Menu.

== Early years as a resort ==
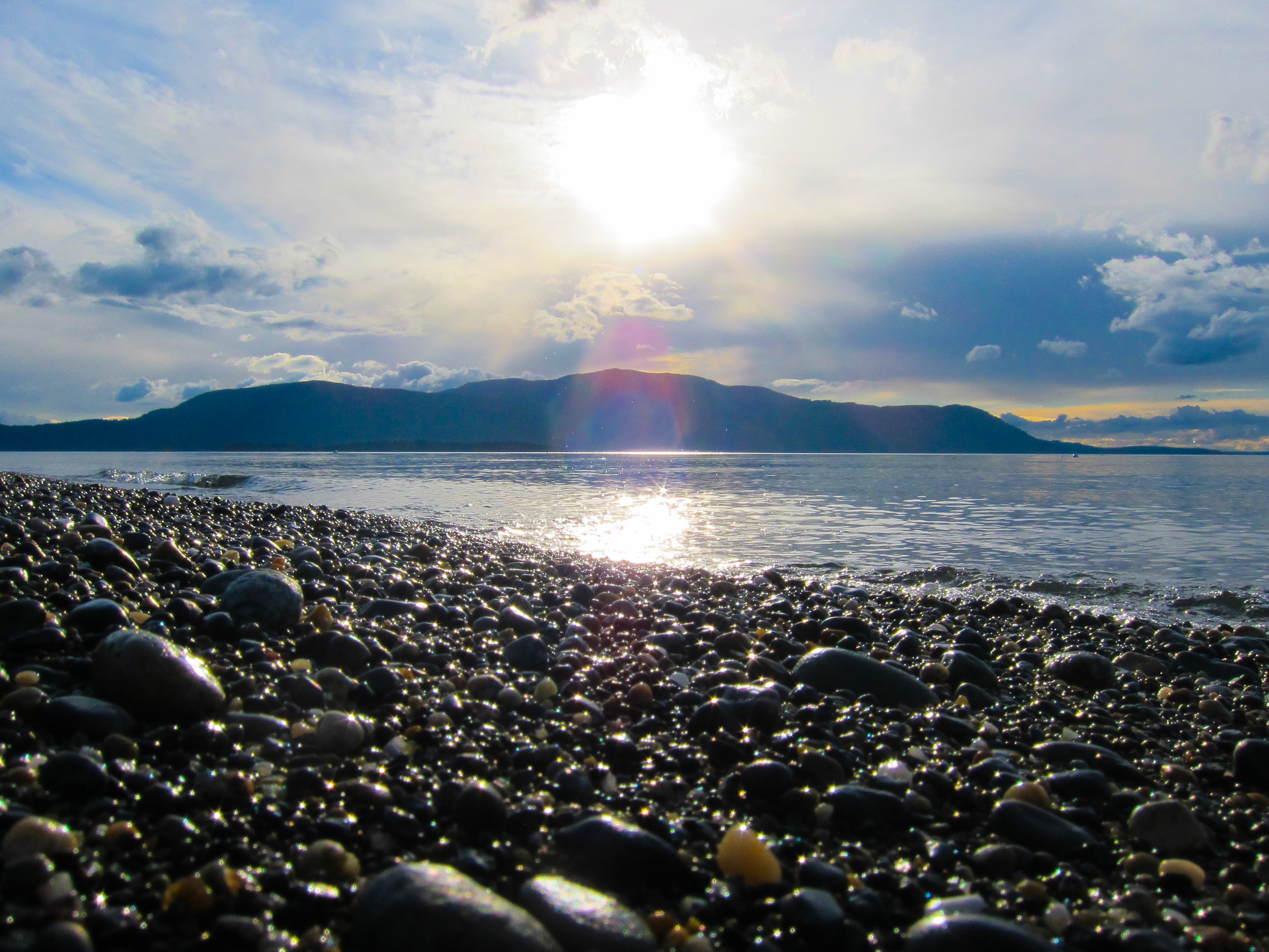
Orcas Island viewed from the Willows Inn across Rosario Strait.

Originally known as "The Willows", the inn was constructed by Frank and Ruby Taft as a seven-room bungalow c. 1910. It was located on the western shore of Lummi Island overlooking Rosario Strait and the San Juan Islands. By 1913, it was a bustling summer resort featuring 28 cabins and attracting visitors from Vancouver, Victoria, Seattle and Tacoma. World War II-era travel and currency restrictions, as well as gas rationing, decreased traffic to Lummi Island. New owners after World War II could not keep the resort viable, however, and the Taft family resumed ownership. The Willows' season ran from Memorial Day to Labor Day, and Ruby Taft's Sunday fried chicken dinners would draw up to 100 diners each week, including many from the mainland. According to Ruby's granddaughter Victoria Flynn, almost everything served at the inn was either homemade or sourced from the inn's farm. Frank and Ruby ran the inn with their daughters Maurine and Dorothy until 1958, when they sold it. A large part of the farm was subdivided into a residential neighborhood.

In 1984, Flynn and her husband, Gary, purchased the Willows and reopened it as a bed and breakfast and wedding reception venue. They operated it for 16 years until Flynn's health prevented her from working long days. They sold the inn to Lummi Island fisherman Riley Starks and his wife in 2001. Starks supplied the fish and produce for the inn's restaurant, while his wife ran the kitchen. In 2009, however, with business affected by the Great Recession, Starks' wife left him and he placed an ad on Craigslist to find a new chef.

== Destination restaurant ==
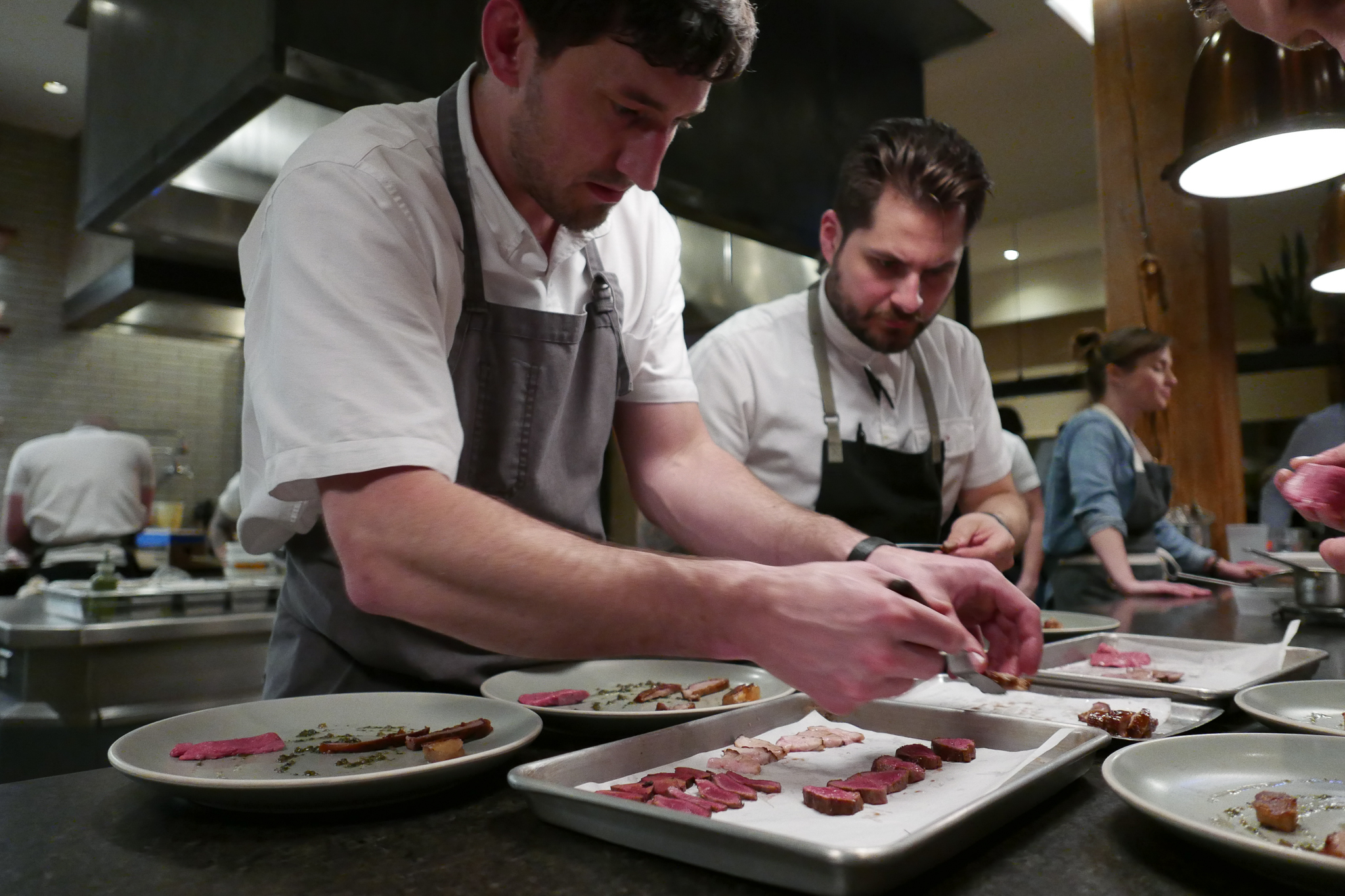
Blaine Wetzel (left) cooks for a collaboration dinner at Smyth in Chicago, May 2018.

Starks received 25 responses to his ad, one of them from Blaine Wetzel, then 24, a chef de partie at Redzepi's much-praised Noma in Copenhagen. In his 1,000-word cover letter, Wetzel pitched Starks on "a small chef-driven kitchen with the emphasis on the garden." Starks hired Wetzel, who planned a menu that would incorporate local salmon, Lummi Island's many varieties of berries, seaweeds and beach plants, local shellfish, and produce from Starks' organic farm. Working alone in the kitchen, Wetzel began serving five-course meals with a single nightly seating in the fall of 2010. Wetzel's reputation as a former Noma chef brought the inn its best autumn under Starks' ownership, Starks said. The inn closed in January 2011 for a three-month renovation. That month, The New York Times described it as one of "10 restaurants worth a plane ride", noting that despite its two-hour distance (with ferry connection) from Seattle, "it is about to become a destination restaurant."

The restaurant re-opened in March 2011 with an 18-course tasting menu priced at $85 (which rose to $150 by 2013, $225 by 2018 and $285 by 2021). By 2018, the Willows Inn had a staff of 40. It would close each winter from December to March. In 2012, Starks sold the inn to Tim and Marcia McEvoy. Wetzel later became a co-owner of the Willows Inn. Under Wetzel's leadership, the Willows Inn was praised by outlets around the world, including The Sydney Morning Herald, The Globe and Mail, The Wall Street Journal, and Saveur.

=== Cuisine ===
The Willows Inn was known for purportedly hyperlocal Pacific Northwest cuisine, with news reports describing the ingredients as sourced "almost exclusively" from Lummi Island and reporting that the staff "grow, forage, cook and serve everything. The only thing they buy commercially is oil and salt." According to Eater, approximately 80 percent of the menu came from Lummi Island. Wetzel claimed that the restaurant slaughtered chickens to make its own stock.

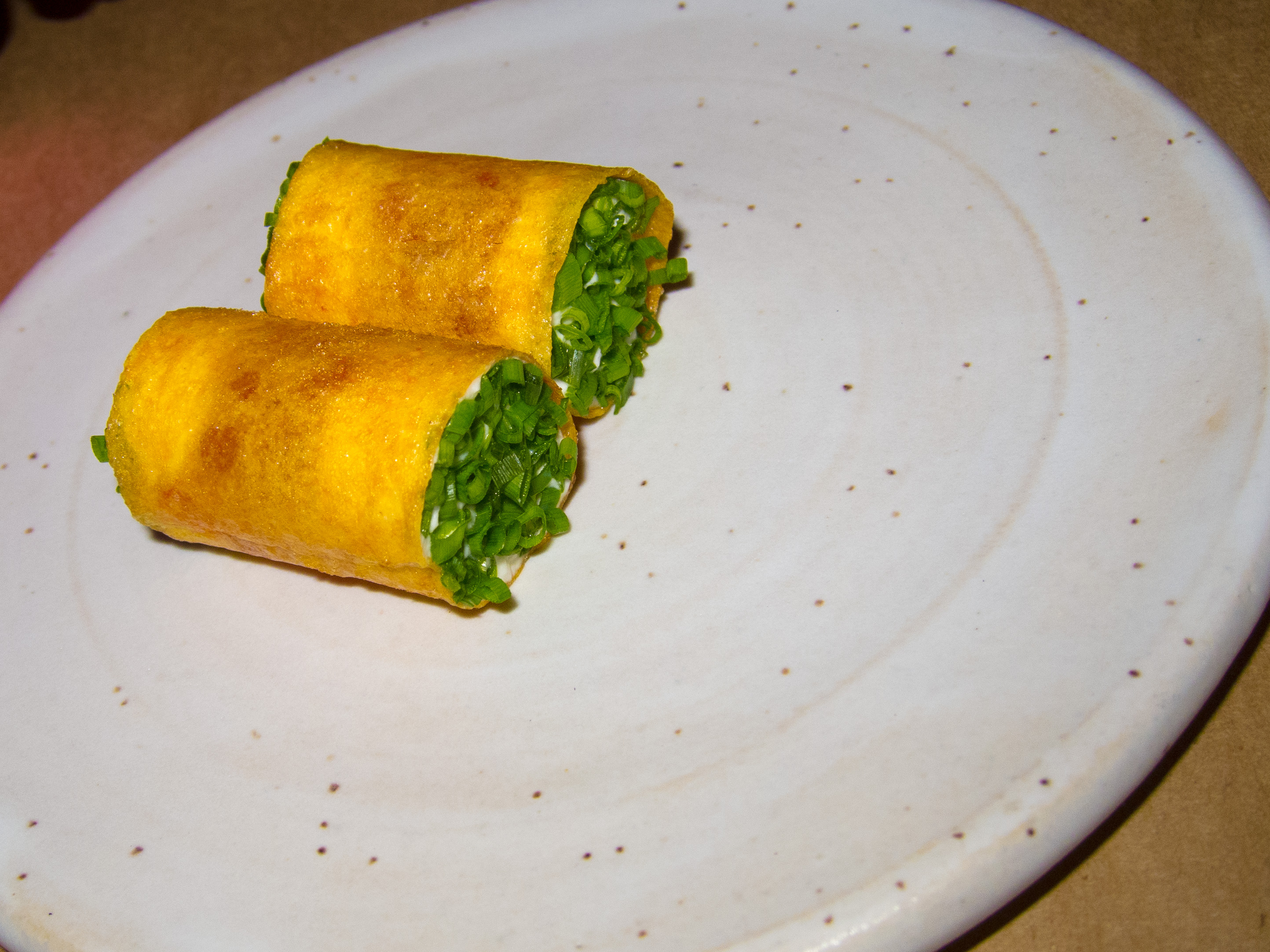
A crispy crêpe with salmon roe

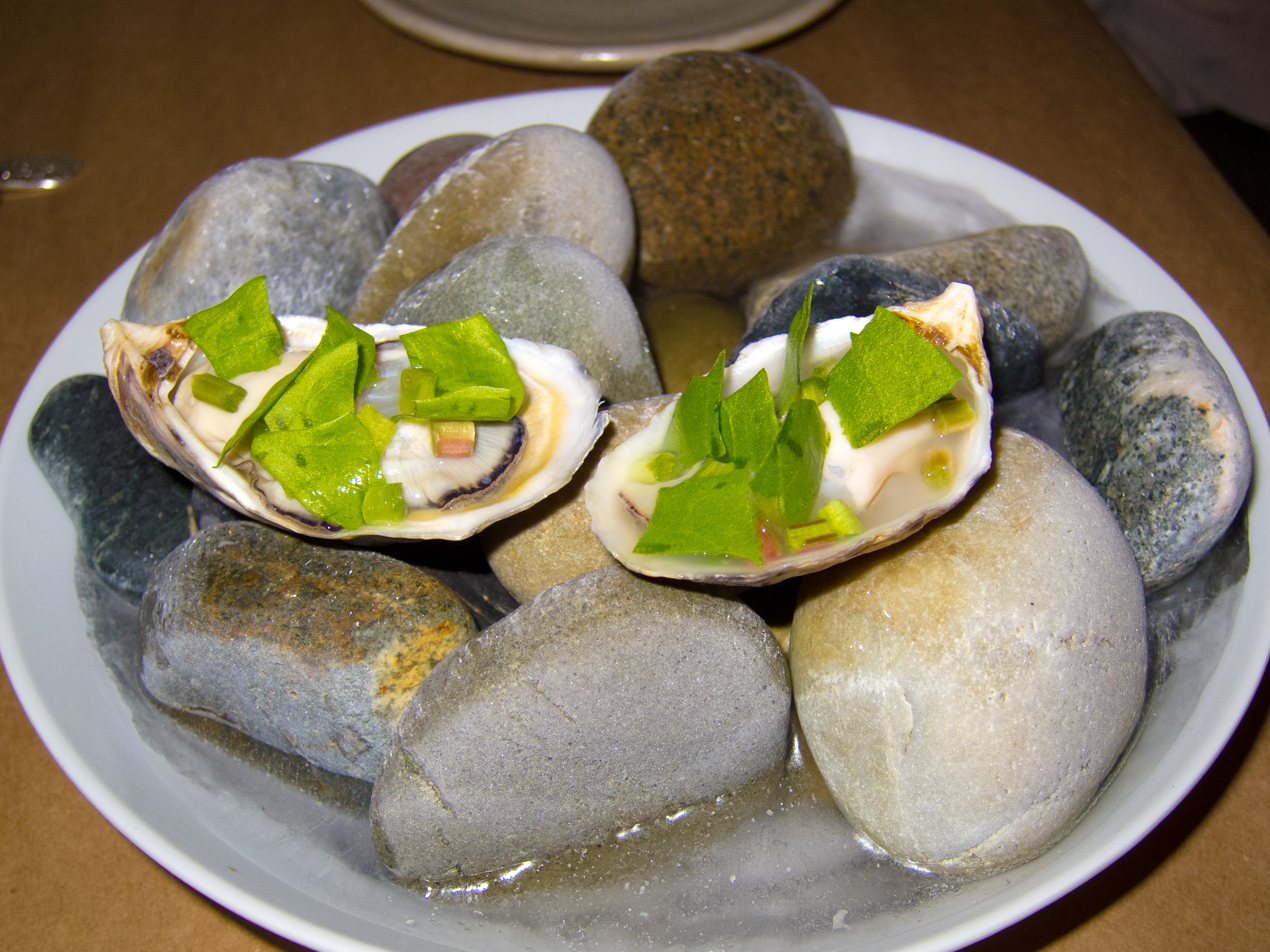
Pickled oysters with sorrel

Sample dishes at the Willows Inn included: a single bite of smoked sockeye salmon served in a cedar container with alderwood smoke; raw razor clams with horseradish ice and blue potatoes and pickled oysters served with sorrel; beet and rhubarb nigiri; ling cod ceviche; side-stripe shrimp; steelhead roe in crème fraîche inside a crêpe; and geoduck in seaweed oil. Wetzel reproduced Noma's presentation style, with "unconventional vessels" and dishes delivered to the table by the chefs themselves.

The simpler breakfast and lunch meals served for overnight guests also became attractions in their own right, according to Bill Addison in Eater. Addison later described the breakfast as "the most extravagant breakfast of my life" due to its use of summer fruits.

== Closure ==
Amid the acclaim for the restaurant, the Willows Inn was the subject of numerous controversies starting in 2017. That year, after a U.S. Department of Labor (DOL) investigation, the restaurant agreed to pay nearly $150,000 (half of it unpaid overtime and half of it damages) to 19 workers. DOL found that as part of its staging program for trainees, entry-level kitchen staff were required to serve a one-month trial without pay, after which they would be paid as little as $50 per day, with no overtime, for workdays reaching 14 hours. Volunteer labor in staging is a common practice at high-end European restaurants, and five to six candidates each week asked to stage at the Willows Inn. Willows Inn described all the participants in the program as volunteers and said that "[o]nce we were informed by the Department of Labor that the practice of staging was illegal we ended the program immediately." Employees at the inn from 2014 to 2017 filed a class action lawsuit in 2017 charging that the Willows Inn had withheld tips and overtime payments. The restaurant settled the lawsuit in 2021 for $600,000 without admitting wrongdoing.

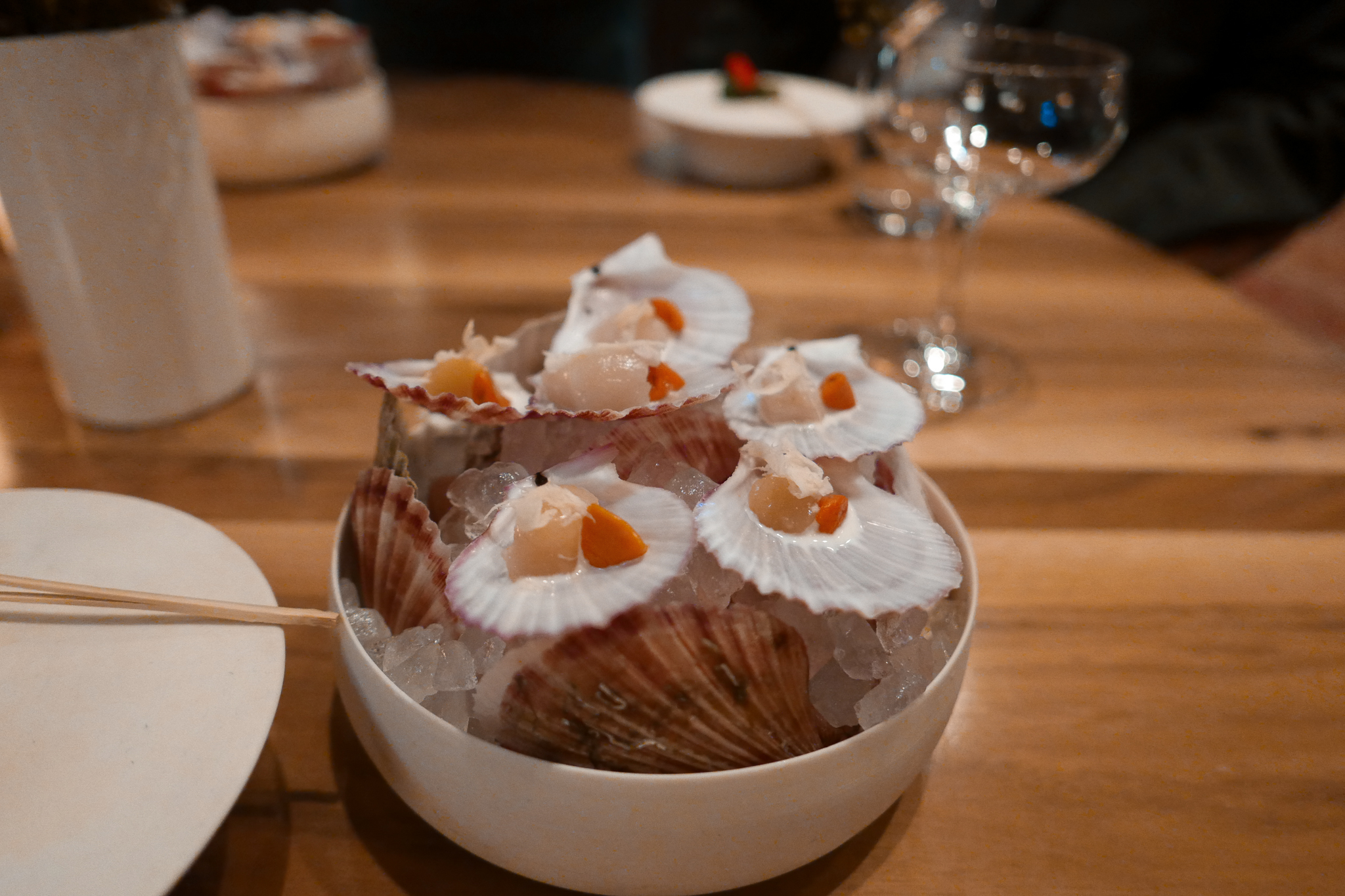
Wetzel's pink scallops dish photographed in 2018

The New York Times in April 2021 published a lengthy article quoting 35 former Willows Inn employees who alleged that the restaurant often used non-local foods and obscured their true origins, that Wetzel verbally abused and intimidated employees and that male staff members sexually harassed female employees. According to the Times, employees said that "most ingredients were ordered from distributors and farms on the mainland. When local produce ran out, cooks routinely bought supermarket ingredients, like beets and broccoli, that were then passed off as grown or gathered on Lummi." One signature chicken dish was made with chickens purchased from Costco, the Times said. A former line cook reported cutting frozen Alaskan scallops "down to the shape and size of pink singing scallops."

Employees reported that Wetzel used derogatory and racist language. Wetzel "denied the substance of most allegations", according to the Times. The Times reported that former employees tolerated Wetzel's alleged behavior because a recommendation from him could open doors for many cooking jobs. Female employees also claimed that male staff members harassed them with "sexual overtures and innuendo". Although they did not allege that Wetzel himself engaged in this activity, they said that Wetzel was present at events where underage staff drank alcohol, which Wetzel also denied.

The New York Times article resulted in local protests on Lummi Island, including a sailboat that passed back and forth in front of the inn's dining room windows with anti-Wetzel messages on its sails. After the article appeared, the 2017 class action lawsuit was amended to include 137 employees at the Willows Inn from 2018 to 2022 who alleged wage theft and lack of required breaks. This amended lawsuit was settled for $1.37 million, with three additional cases settled by November 2022.

Wetzel's wife, Daniela Soto-Innes, joined the staff of the Willows Inn after leaving her restaurant Cosme in New York City in 2020. She brought several of her staff from Cosme and added Mexican elements to the Pacific Northwest menu. Soto-Innes held a "coaching" role alongside Wetzel, and during her tenure there, in August 2022, the Willows Inn had a half female and mostly immigrant staff.

In November 2022, the Willows Inn permanently closed. Co-owners Tim and Marcia McEvoy donated the inn and restaurant property, valued at $2 million, to Lighthouse Mission Ministries, an organization combating homelessness in Bellingham. The property was listed for sale in April 2024.

== Awards ==
Under Wetzel, the Willows Inn received several awards and ratings, including a four-diamond rating from the American Automobile Association. It was named the top restaurant in North America by the website Opinionated About Dining in 2017. Wetzel was named to Food & Wine Best New Chefs list in 2012 and given the James Beard Rising Star Chef Award in 2014 and the James Beard Award for Best Chef Northwest in 2015.

== Cultural portrayal ==
The Willows Inn was one of several restaurants that inspired the satirical 2022 horror comedy The Menu, in which a fictional destination restaurant offering an expensive tasting menu is located on a Pacific Northwest island reached only by boat.
