= Portage Island =

Island in Whatcom County, Washington, United States

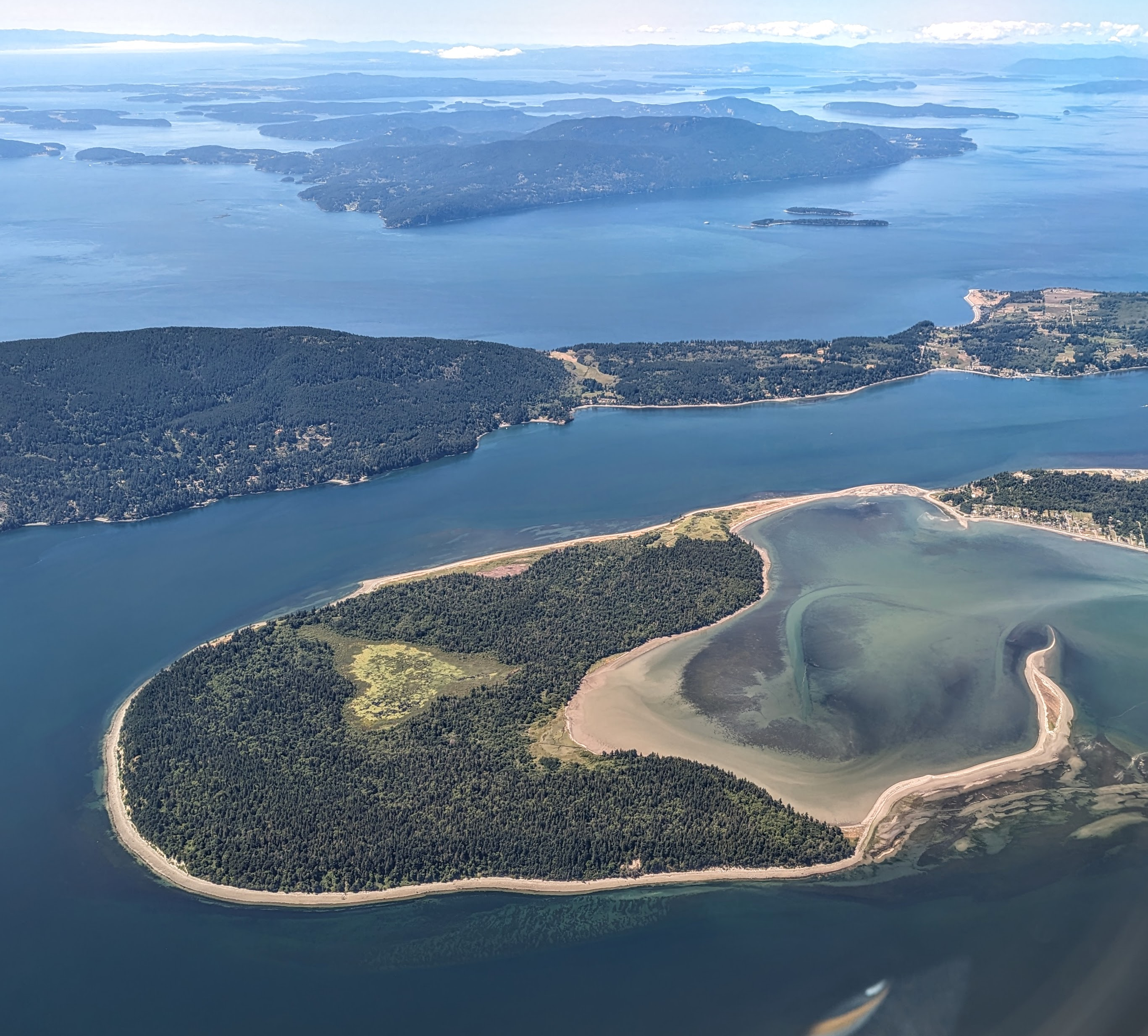
- Aerial view of Portage Island with Lummi Island behind

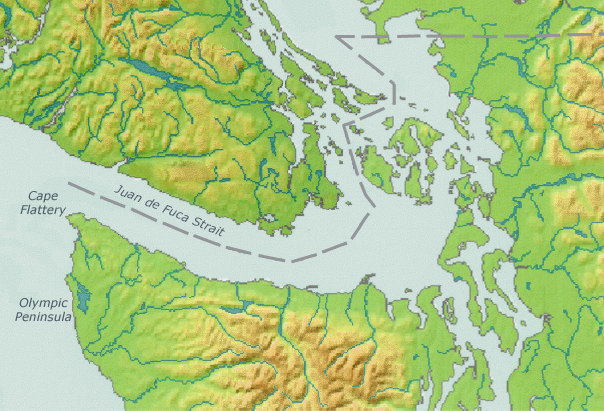
- Location within Strait of Juan de Fuca Location within Washington (state)

Geography
- Location: Bellingham Bay, Whatcom County, Washington
- Coordinates: 48°42′N 122°37′W
- Area: 923.25 acres (373.63 ha)
- Highest elevation: 209 ft (63.7 m)

Administration
- Lummi Nation

Demographics
- Population: 0 (2025)

Portage Island (also known as Point Francis) is an island in the western part of Bellingham Bay in Whatcom County, Washington, United States. It is separated from the Lummi Peninsula by Portage Bay and from the central part of Lummi Island by Hale Passage.

At low tide the mudflats connect to the mainland with a long sand strip on the west side of the island called The Portage, allowing access on foot or vehicle. Another sand strip on the east side of the island is called Brant Point.

== History ==
Before European settlers arrived in the Pacific Northwest, Portage Island had long been a winter village, gathering ground, and a place of spiritual significance for the Lummi people.

The island was named Point Frances by George Vancouver during the Vancouver Expedition in June 1792, along with Bellingham Bay and Point William (Samish Island). The name was later changed to Point Francis, possibly in the 1860s to honor United States consul Allen Francis stationed in Victoria, British Columbia.

In 1965, the Parks Board of Whatcom County showed interest in creating a park on Portage Island, and bought the island for $1.4 million (equivalent to $11 million in 2024), although later, in 1970, the Lummi Nation objected to the plans to build a park, citing interference with tribal fishing and shellfishing around the island, increased disruptive car traffic through the reservation, and the loss of almost a thousand acres of tribal land. The Bureau of Indian Affairs generally sided with the Lummi Nation, while other parts of the Department of the Interior generally sided with the Parks Board. In 1978, after years of no agreement, then Interior Secretary, Cecil Andrus, ordered a mediation. It was decided that mediators from the Office of Environmental Mediation at the University of Washington would be the ones to mediate the case. After months of meetings, an agreement was made that the Parks Board would sell the island back to the Lummi Nation on the condition it would still be developed as a park. Stipulations included no boat landings or marinas could be built to protect fishing, and the Bureau of Indian Affairs would provide money for the tribe to buy the island. The dispute ended in 1980 with the Whatcom County Commissioners voting to sell the island back to the Lummi Nation. A park never ended up being built.

In August 2024, the Washington State Department of Health reopened 360 acres of the Lummi Nation's shellfish beds in Portage Bay that brought the total area available for year-round harvest to 876 acres. A seasonal closure remains in effect from September 1 to November 30 for 440 acres of Lummi Nation shellfish beds. The Portage Bay upgrades show that community members acting to keep local waterways clean and reduce bacteria pollution is having a positive impact. However, there is still much work to be done, as explained by Lummi Natural Resources: "The reclassification marks a positive milestone in our partners' efforts to improve water quality."

Crews from the Bellingham Fire Department responded on July 6, 2025, to a fire on Portage Island. Aerial suppression efforts were visible in a video as a helicopter dropped water on the fire. Firefighting efforts were also supported by the Lummi Nation Police Department, Lummi Fire Department and Lummi Natural Resources Department. Portage Island has no permanent residents. The island is owned by the Lummi Nation.

There were similar fires on the south side of the island in early July 2009 and 2015. An investigation of the 2015 fire determined fireworks were the cause and an arrest made according to Lummi Communications.

== Topography ==
Portage Island is a relatively flat island made of glacial drift. The island has two large sand spits to the north, called The Portage and Brant Point. The southern shoreline of the island has been found to be eroding, and depositing on the spits.

A total of 703 acres (284 ha) on Portage Island is forested. The old-growth was largely chopped down to fuel steamboats on the Nooksack River.
