= Stagiaire =

Stagiaire may refer to:

- Stage (cooking) or stagiaire, a cook who works briefly, for free, in another chef's kitchen
- Stagiaire (cycling), an amateur cyclist temporarily riding for a professional team
- A particular type of trainee, see European Civil Service#Staff

== See also ==
- Internship
