= Tanglewood Island =

Island in Pierce County, Washington, United States

Tanglewood
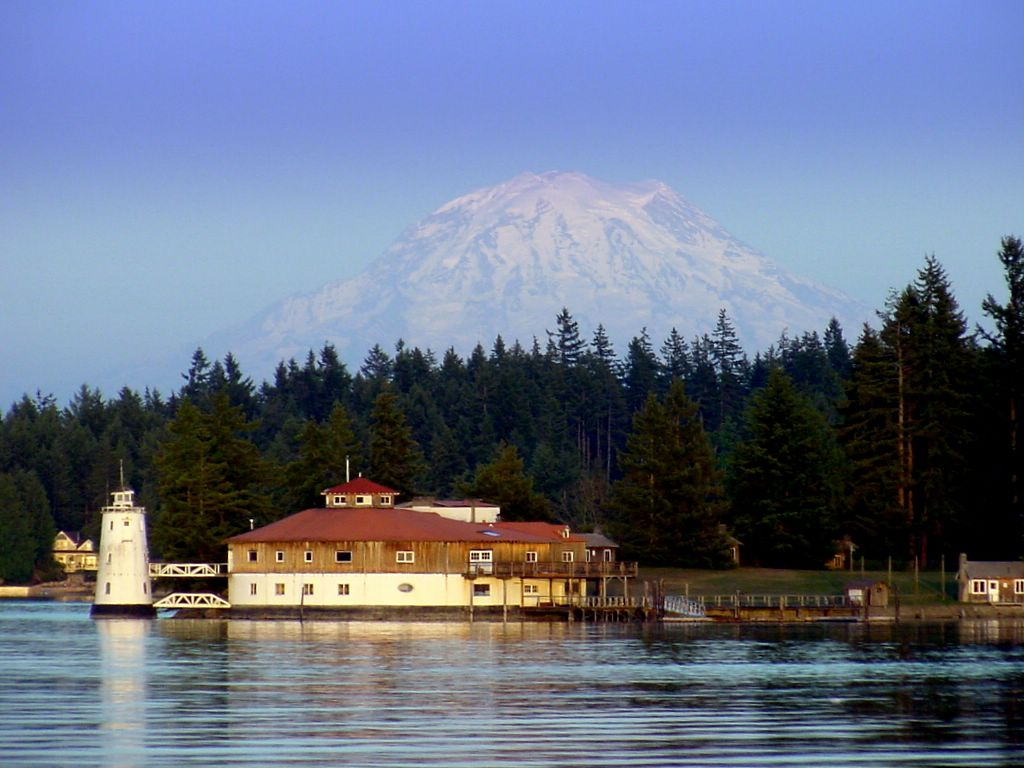
- A non-functioning lighthouse on the island; in the background is Mount Rainier
- Interactive map of Tanglewood

Geography
- Location: Hale Passage (Puget Sound)
- Coordinates: 47.268°N 122.642°W
- Area: 18 acres (7.3 ha)
- Length: 1,800 ft (550 m)
- Width: 600 ft (180 m)

Administration
- United States

Tanglewood Island is a small island in Hale Passage off the northern shore of Fox Island in Pierce County, Washington. It was originally called Grave Island and was sacred to the Nisqually Indians, who for decades practiced tree burials by placing their honored dead in dugout canoes high in the fir trees.

Later on, the island was purchased and used as a summer home by Conrad L. Hoska (1856–1910), a Tacoma pioneer. In 1933, Dr. Alfred Schultz, a Tacoma physician, purchased the island for $8,000, and according to him, the Smithsonian Institution had removed all traceable relics from Grave Island prior to 1891. Dr. Schultz built and ran a boy's camp, Camp Ta-Ha-Do-Wa, on the island from 1945. In 1946 the lighthouse and lodge (pictured) on the northern tip of the island were completed, with the lighthouse being used during the summer as Dr. Schultz's office and as an infirmary. According to the Seattle Times (April 17, 1947), the Tanglewood Lighthouse was the first round lighthouse to be built in the US in 85 years. The government approved its design, authorized the installation of a beacon light, turned on in June, 1947, and consented to changing the island's name from Grave to Tanglewood. The lighthouse is no longer functional but stood for many years as a historical monument to the island, the camp, and Dr. Schultz. (Harbor History Museum Blog, November 28, 2013.) Following Dr. Schultz's death, his estate sold Tanglewood Island to a group of several individuals, who subdivided the island into plots, one for each member of the group. In 2014, when the lighthouse and main lodge had long since become rotten and nonfunctional, they began to tear them down but were stopped by Pierce County officials for failing to have the proper demolition permits. (KOMO News, January 30, 2014.)

The Geographic Names Information System lists several alternative names: Ellens Isle, Grant Island, Grave Island, and Hoska Island. The name Tanglewood was inspired by the heavy undergrowth and Nathaniel Hawthorne's Tanglewood Tales. It was chosen as the official name of the island by the U.S. Board on Geographic Names in 1947.

In the 2010 United States census, the island was included as part of the Fox Island census-designated place. The census block encompassing just Tanglewood Island showed a population of 8 with 5 housing units.
