= Daniela Soto-Innes =

Mexican chef

Daniela Soto-Innes is a Mexican-born chef and the youngest chef to be named World's Best Female Chef by The World's 50 Best Restaurants. Born in Mexico City, Mexico to two lawyers, she moved to Texas at the age of 12. She was a competitive swimmer until she was 20. She studied at Le Cordon Bleu in Austin, Texas and then trained in both Europe and New York under chefs Danny Trace, Chris Shepherd and Enrique Olvera. In 2014, she helped to open Cosme in New York City, serving there as the Chef de Cuisine. In 2017, in partnership with chef Enrique Olvera, she opened the restaurant Atla.

After leaving Cosme, Soto-Innes worked alongside her husband, Blaine Wetzel, at the Willows Inn before its closure in 2022 and added Mexican elements to the inn's menu. In 2022, Soto-Innes announced that she and Wetzel would open a restaurant in Nayarit, Mexico, although Wetzel later stated that the project was solely that of Soto-Innes.

== Awards ==
In 2016, she received the James Beard Award for Rising Star Chef. In 2019, she was named the World's Best Female Chef at the World's 50 Best Restaurant Awards.

Travel Channel named her one of the ten up and coming chefs to look out for based on her work at Cosme in Manhattan.

== Personal life ==
Soto-Innes met fellow chef Wetzel while in Bilbao in 2018 for an awards program. They began dating and became engaged in March 2019 and, according to Soto-Innes' Instagram feed, married in January 2020.
