= Virginia Frances Sterrett =

American illustrator (1900–1931)

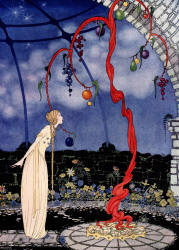
"Rosalie saw before her eyes a tree of marvelous beauty", one of Sterrett's illustrations for Old French Fairy Tales (1920)

Virginia Frances Sterrett (/ˈstɛrɪt/; 1900–1931) was an American artist and illustrator.

== Early life ==
Sterrett was born in Chicago, Illinois in 1900. After her father's death, she and her family moved to Missouri but returned to Chicago in 1915. There, she enrolled in high school and later entered the Art Institute of Chicago with scholarship. One year after entering the institute, Sterrett's mother grew ill and Sterrett dropped out to provide for her family. She gained work at an art advertisement agency.

== Career ==
Sterrett received her first commission at the age of 19 (shortly after she was diagnosed with tuberculosis) from the Penn Publishing Company to illustrate Old French Fairy Tales (1920), a collection of works from the 19th-century French author, Comtesse de Ségur (Sophie Fedorovna Rostopchine).

A year after the publication of Old French Fairy Tales, a new title including commissioned works from Sterrett was presented by the Penn Publishing Company—Tanglewood Tales (1921). From 1923, in failing health, Sterrett was able to work on projects for short periods of time only and as a result, she was able to complete just one further commission prior to her death—her own interpretation of Arabian Nights (1928).

Her best-known work is the suite of illustrations for Arabian Nights (1928). She died of tuberculosis in Monrovia, California.

The comments of the St Louis Post-Dispatch in the supplement published following Sterrett's death (published July 5, 1931) pay fitting tribute to her life and work:

Her achievement was beauty, a delicate, fantastic beauty, created with brush and pencil. Almost unschooled in art, her life spent in prosaic places of the West and Middle West, she made pictures of haunting loveliness, suggesting Oriental lands she never saw and magical realms no one ever knew except in the dreams of childhood ... Perhaps it was the hardships of her own life that gave the young artist's work its fanciful quality. In the imaginative scenes she set down on paper she must have escaped from the harsh actualities of existence.

== Works ==
All three books were published by the Penn Publishing Company. They were large books with large type, simple stories, and designed as gift books for children.

- Old French Fairy Tales by Comtesse de Segur, 1920
- Tanglewood Tales by Nathaniel Hawthorne, 1921
- Arabian Nights, 1928
