= Fox Island, Washington =

Fox Island, Washington Bu-Ta-U
- CDP
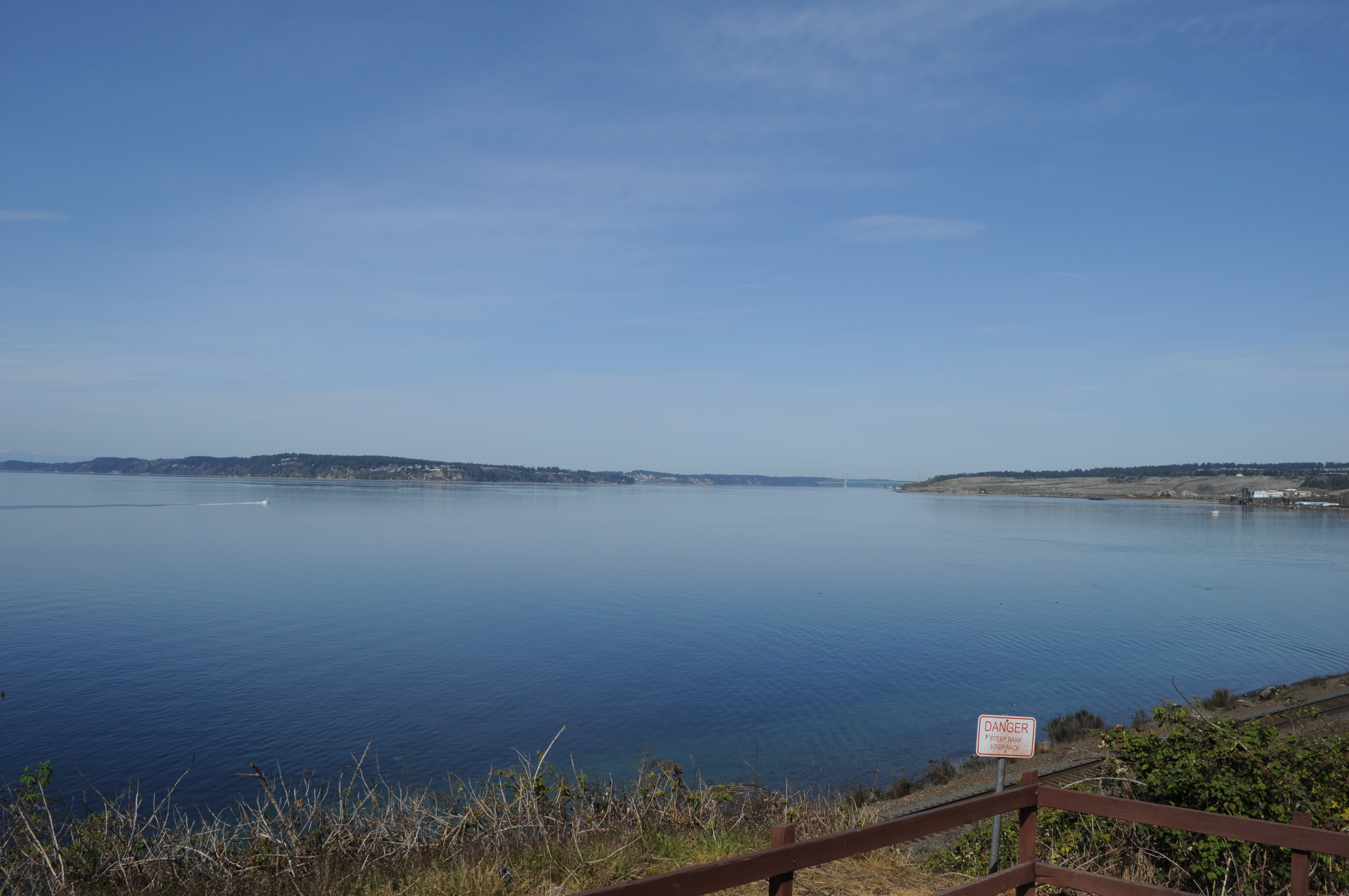
- Fox Island on the left

- Location of Fox Island in Pierce County, Washington
- Coordinates: 47°14′49″N 122°37′32″W
- Country: United States
- State: Washington
- County: Pierce

Area
  - Total: 6.4 sq mi (16.6 km^{2})
  - Land: 5.2 sq mi (13.5 km^{2})
  - Water: 1.2 sq mi (3.0 km^{2})
- Elevation: 328 ft (100 m)

Population (2020)
  - Total: 3,921
  - Density: 752/sq mi (290/km^{2})
- Time zone: UTC-8 (Pacific (PST))
  - Summer (DST): UTC-7 (PDT)
- ZIP code: 98333
- Area code: 253
- FIPS code: 53-25370
- GNIS feature ID: 2408253

Fox Island is an island and census-designated place (CDP) in Pierce County, Washington, United States, located in Puget Sound. It is located approximately 5 miles (8 km) from Gig Harbor. The island was named Fox by Charles Wilkes during the United States Exploring Expedition, to honor J.L. Fox, an assistant surgeon on the expedition. The population was 3,921 at the 2020 census, up from 3,633 at the 2010 census.

== Geography ==
According to the United States Census Bureau, the census-designated place has a total area of 6.4 square miles (17 km^{2}), of which, 5.2 square miles (13 km^{2}) of it is land and 1.2 square miles (3.1 km^{2}) of it (18.31%) is water.

Fox Island is separated from the mainland by Hale Passage to the north. The Fox Island Bridge crosses that passage to connect the road network to the mainland at Artondale. A small inhabited island named Tanglewood lies just off Fox Island along the Hale Passage; it was included as part of the Fox Island CDP for the 2010 Census. To the southwest, Carr Inlet separates Fox Island from McNeil Island.

== History ==
The island was part of the territory of the Steilacoom people, a Coast Salish tribe.

In 1792, during the Vancouver Expedition, Peter Puget led an exploration party through southern Puget Sound. After an encounter with local Native tribes ended with Puget ordering a musket fired as warning, the exploration party retreated to Fox Island, where they made camp for the night.

In 1856, during the Puget Sound War, most of the Puyallup and "non-hostile" Nisqually Indians, totaling about 500 people, were removed from their homelands and displaced to Fox Island. John Swan was assigned to supervise the internment camp and distribute food rations provided by the government (territorial government). On January 5, 1856, Chief Leschi and other "hostile" Indians arrived at Fox Island with a flotilla of canoes. Trusting Swan, they had come to talk about the war and how to resolve it. While the hostile Indians were on Fox Island, Captain Maurice Maloney took the steamship Beaver to the island, hoping to rescue Swan, but forgot to bring landing craft and was unable to send men ashore. Before Maloney could figure out what to do, Swan came to the shore and paddled a canoe to the Beaver. He told Maloney that there had been no violence, urged him to not come ashore, and said he had promised to return to the island, which he did. Maloney returned to Steilacoom and, along with other military officers, took another steamship, the USS Active from Steilacoom to Seattle to get a howitzer (which they failed to acquire), then back to Fox Island, hoping to capture Chief Leschi. But by the time the Active returned, more than 30 hours after Leschi had arrived on Fox Island, the hostile Indians had left.

By August 1856 the war was essentially over. Governor Isaac Stevens went to the Indian encampment on Fox Island to renegotiate the 1854 Treaty of Medicine Creek, which had been a major factor in the outbreak of war. Stevens agreed to new, larger reservations for both the Puyallup and Nisqually tribes.

The first non-Indians settled on Fox island in 1856, just after the war ended. One of the first real estate transactions was in 1881 when 56.5 acres (22.6 hectares) were sold for $118. By 1908 there were about 60 homes scattered across the island.

The most important change to this community happened in 1954 when the Fox Island Bridge was completed, connecting Fox Island to the mainland. This allowed easy access to businesses, schools, and medical facilities outside the island. During the construction a historical Indian canoe was found preserved in the mud, which can be visited in the Fox Island history museum. In 1956 the population of the island was 120, by 2000 it had grown to more than 2,800.

Cartoonist Gary Larson visited Fox Island frequently as a child. He has called Fox Island a "wondrous place" and credits the island's swamps and wildlife with inspiring his interest in nature.

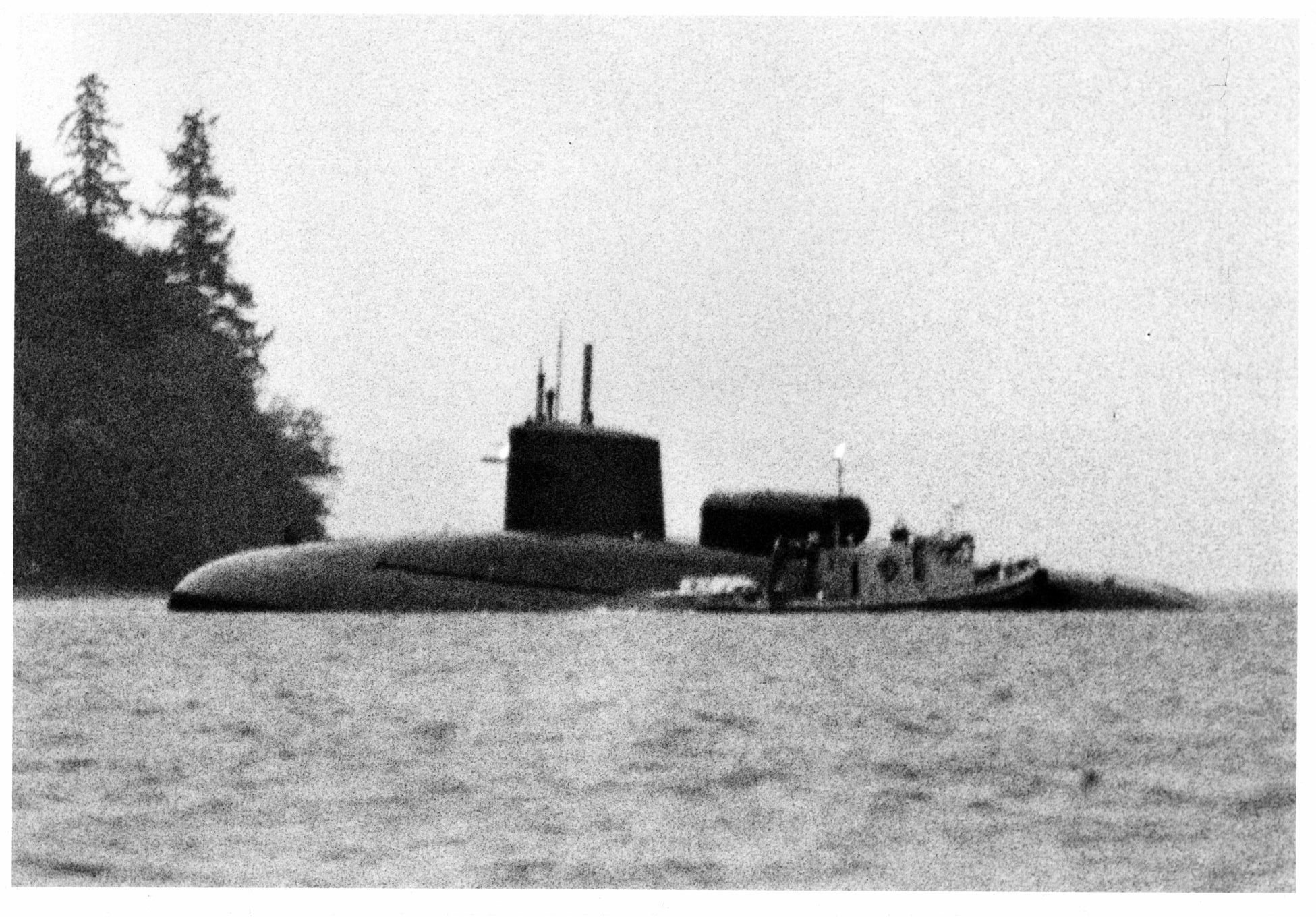
Nuclear submarine Sam Houston aground on the southwest shore of Fox Island

On April 29, 1988, at 6 PM local time, a nuclear-powered US Navy submarine, the USS Sam Houston (SSBN-609), ran aground on Fox Island while operating in nearby Carr Inlet. The ship remained aground for approximately 10 hours until high tide returned and tugboats were brought in to unstick the ship. No damage was done to the island, and the ship entered a drydock at the Bangor Naval Submarine Base for minor repairs to its hull.

In recent years, Fox Island has become a wealthy exurb of Tacoma, largely because of the amount of waterfront property on the island and because of the island's location between the Olympic Mountains and Mount Rainier; a large number of the island's residential properties have views. Based on per capita income, one of the more reliable measures of affluence, Fox Island ranks 29th of the 522 ranked areas in the state of Washington.

== Demographics ==
Historical population
Census	Pop.	Note	%±
2000	2,803		—
U.S. Decennial Census; 1970 1980 1990; 2000 2010

As of the census of 2000, there were 2,803 people, 1,048 households, and 847 families residing in the CDP. The population density was 536.3 people per square mile (206.9/km^{2}). There were 1,150 housing units at an average density of 220.0/sq mi (84.9/km^{2}). The racial makeup of the CDP was 94.08% White, 0.64% African American, 0.75% Native American, 1.64% Asian, 0.14% Pacific Islander, 0.39% from other races, and 2.35% from two or more races. Hispanic or Latino of any race were 1.86% of the population.

There were 1,048 households, out of which 36.8% had children under the age of 18 living with them, 72.4% were married couples living together, 6.1% had a female householder with no husband present, and 19.1% were non-families. 15.1% of all households were made up of individuals, and 4.8% had someone living alone who was 65 years of age or older. The average household size was 2.67 and the average family size was 2.97.

In the CDP, the population was spread out, with 27.3% under the age of 18, 4.4% from 18 to 24, 25.0% from 25 to 44, 31.8% from 45 to 64, and 11.5% who were 65 years of age or older. The median age was 42 years. For every 100 females, there were 100.6 males. For every 100 females age 18 and over, there were 96.0 males.

The median income for a household in the CDP was $69,135, and the median income for a family was $72,284. Males had a median income of $61,208 versus $39,821 for females. The per capita income for the CDP was $32,533. About 1.7% of families and 3.2% of the population were below the poverty line, including 5.0% of those under age 18 and none of those age 65 or over.

== Transportation ==
The Fox Island Bridge opened on August 28, 1954, and connects the island to Key Peninsula over a channel in Puget Sound. The Washington State Toll Bridge Authority (TBA) built the 1,981-foot (604 m) bridge and charged a toll for vehicles and pedestrians. The toll was removed on the TBA's two Pierce County bridges—Fox Island and the Tacoma Narrows Bridge—on May 14, 1965. The bridge replaced a car ferry that had run from Fox Island across the Tacoma Narrows to Titlow Beach in western Tacoma.

== See also ==
- List of islands of Washington (state)
