= Tanglewood Tales =

1853 book by Nathaniel Hawthorne

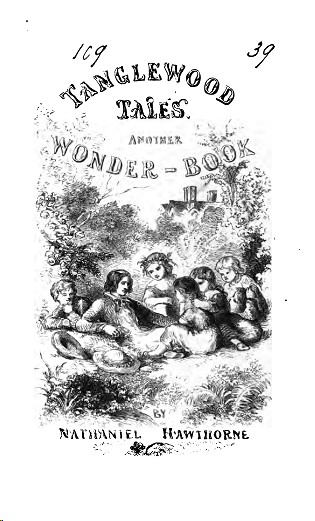
Cover page of first edition (1853)

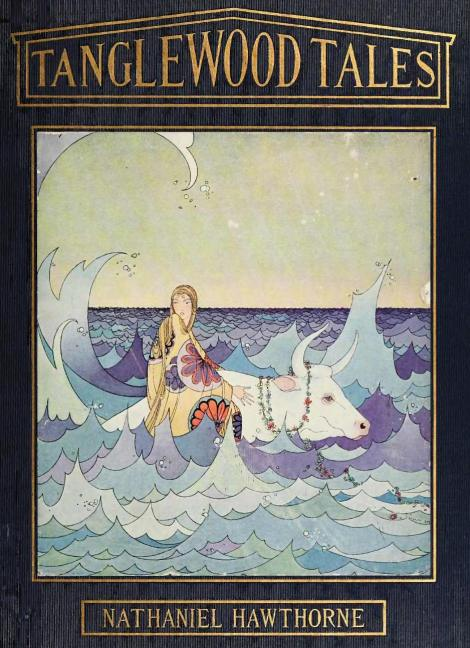
1921 edition illustrated by Virginia Frances Sterrett

Tanglewood Tales for Boys and Girls is an 1853 book by American author Nathaniel Hawthorne, a sequel to A Wonder-Book for Girls and Boys. It is a re-writing of well-known Greek myths in a volume for children.

== Overview ==
The book includes the myths of:

- Theseus and the Minotaur (Chapter: "The Minotaur")
- Antaeus and the Pygmies (Chapter: "The Pygmies")
- Dragon's Teeth (Chapter: "The Dragon's Teeth")
- Circe's Palace (Chapter: "Circe's Palace")
- Proserpina, Ceres, Pluto, and the pomegranate seed (Chapter: "The Pomegranate Seed")
- Jason and the Golden Fleece (Chapter: "The Golden Fleece")

Hawthorne wrote an introduction, titled "The Wayside", referring to The Wayside in Concord, where he lived from 1852 until his death. In the introduction, Hawthorne writes about a visit from his young friend Eustace Bright, who requested a sequel to A Wonder-Book, which impelled him to write the Tales. Although Hawthorne informs us in the introduction that these stories were also later retold by Cousin Eustace, the frame stories of A Wonder-Book have been abandoned.

Hawthorne wrote the first book while renting a small cottage in the Berkshires, a vacation area for industrialists during the Gilded Age. The owner of the cottage, a railroad baron, renamed the cottage "Tanglewood" in honor of the book written there. Later, a nearby mansion was renamed Tanglewood, where outdoor classical concerts were held, which became a Berkshire summer tradition. Ironically, Hawthorne hated living in the Berkshires.

The Tanglewood neighborhood of Houston was named after the book. The book was a favorite of Mary Catherine Farrington, the daughter of Tanglewood developer William Farrington. It reportedly inspired the name of the thickly wooded Tanglewood Island in the state of Washington.
