= A Wonder-Book for Girls and Boys =

1851 book by Nathaniel Hawthorne

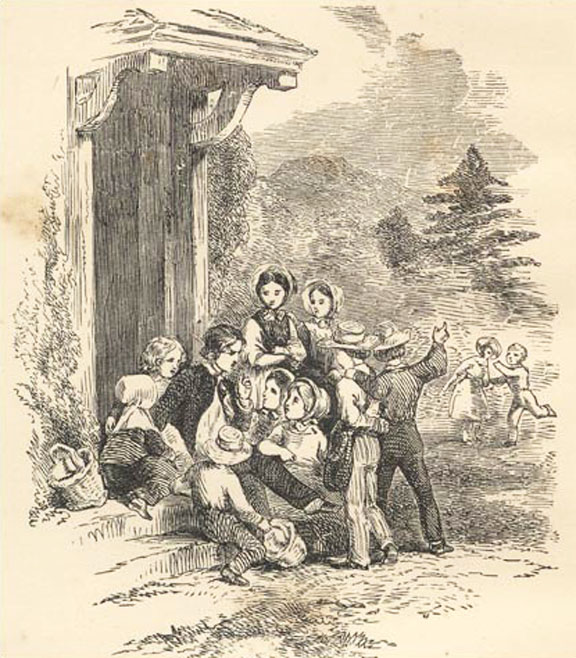
Eustace Bright telling the stories to several children, the frontispiece illustration of an 1880 edition

A Wonder-Book for Girls and Boys is an 1851 children's book by American author Nathaniel Hawthorne in which he retells several Greek myths. It was followed by a sequel, Tanglewood Tales.

== Overview ==
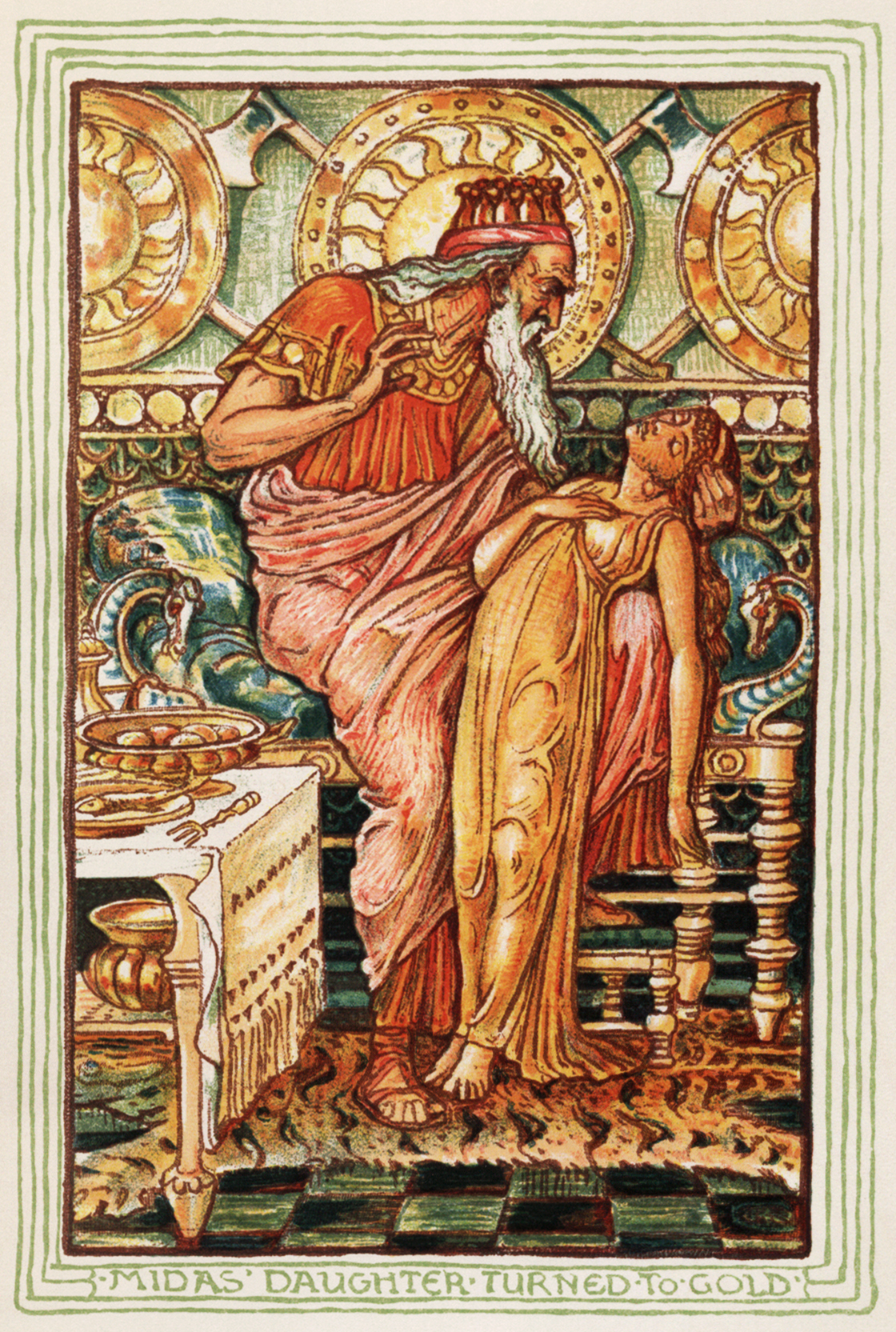
"Midas' Daughter Turned to Gold" by Walter Crane, illustrating the Midas myth for an 1893 edition

The stories in A Wonder-Book for Girls and Boys are all stories within a story. The frame story is that Eustace Bright, a Williams College student, is telling these tales to a group of children at Tanglewood, an area in Lenox, Massachusetts, where Hawthorne lived for a time. All the tales are modified versions of ancient Greek myths:

- "The Gorgon's Head" – recounts the story of Perseus killing Medusa at the request of the king of the island of Seriphos, Polydectes.
- "The Golden Touch" – recounts the story of King Midas and his "Golden Touch".
- "The Paradise of Children" – recounts the story of Pandora opening Pandora's box, which was filled with all of mankind's troubles.
- "The Three Golden Apples" – recounts the story of Heracles procuring the Three Golden Apples from the Hesperides' orchard, with the help of Atlas.
- "The Miraculous Pitcher" – recounts the story of Baucis and Philemon providing food and shelter to two strangers who were Zeus and "Quicksilver" (Hermes) in disguise. Baucis and Philemon were rewarded by the gods for their kindness; they were promised never to live apart from one another.
- "The Chimæra" – recounts the story of Bellerophon taming Pegasus and killing the Chimæra.

== Composition and publication history ==
Hawthorne expressed his idea to rewrite Greek myths as early as 1846 when he outlined a book to Evert Augustus Duyckinck of stories "taken out of the cold moonshine of classical mythology, and modernized, or perhaps gothicized, so that they may be felt by children of these days." In 1851, just after the birth of his daughter Rose, he proposed the idea again in the form of a collection of six tales. His aim would be, he wrote, "substituting a tone in some degree Gothic or romantic, or any such tone as may please myself, instead of the classic coldness, which is as repellent as the touch of marble... and, of course, I shall purge out all the old heathen wickedness, and put in a moral wherever practicable."

Publisher James T. Fields pushed for Hawthorne to complete the project quickly. Fields had begun reissuing the author's earlier series for children titled Grandfather's Child, originally published by Elizabeth Palmer Peabody and now renamed True Stories from History and Biography, and was also planning a new edition of Twice-Told Tales. The entirety of the collection was written between June and mid-July 1851. He sent the final manuscript to Fields on July 15 and wrote: "I am going to begin to enjoy the summer now and to read foolish novels, if I can get any, and smoke cigars and think of nothing at all — which is equivalent to thinking of all manner of things."

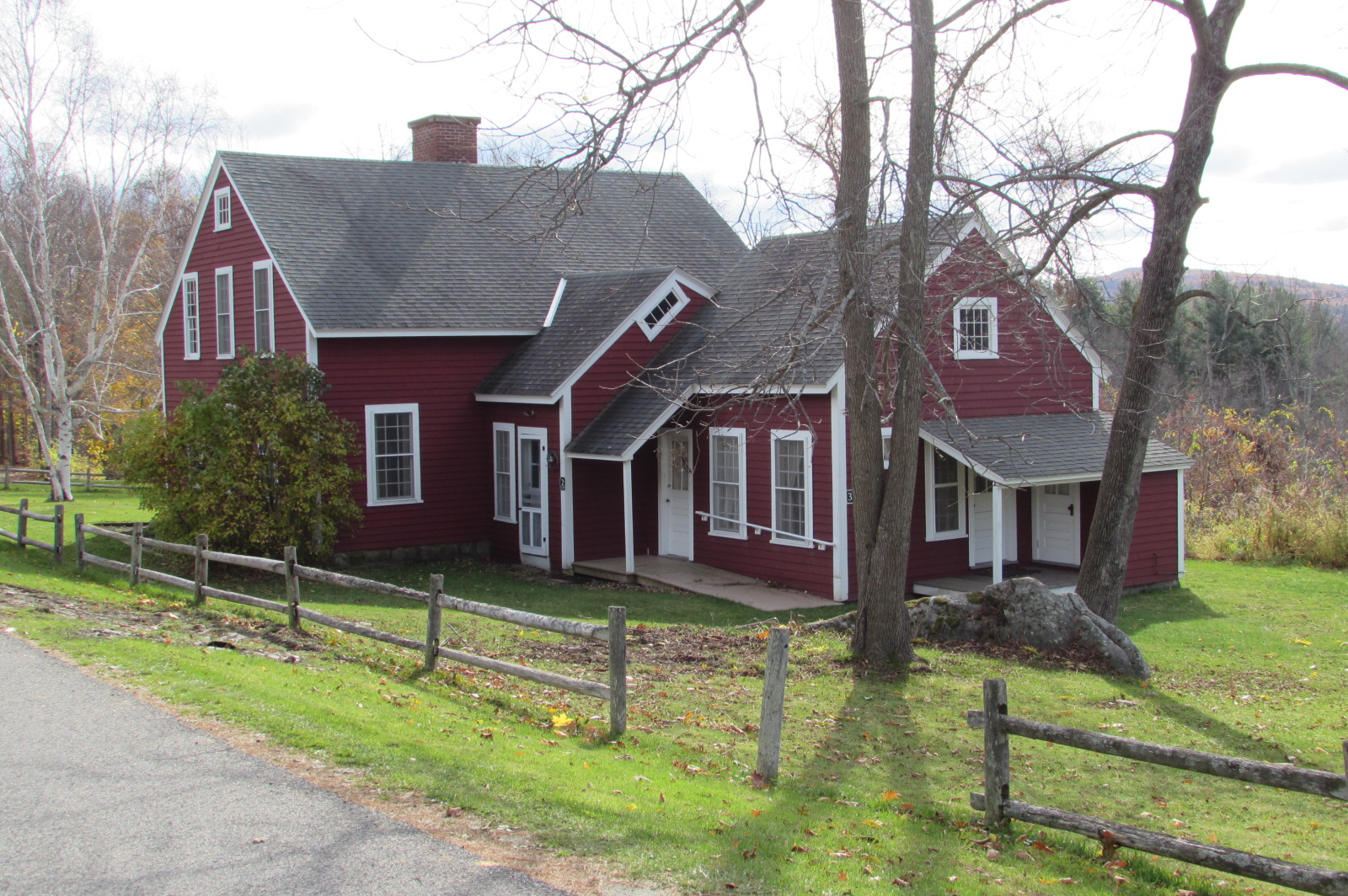
Recreation of the home in Lenox, Massachusetts, where Hawthorne wrote A Wonder-Book

The Hawthornes had moved to The Berkshires shortly after the publication of The Scarlet Letter and it was here that he completed not only A Wonder-Book but also his novel The House of the Seven Gables. He was able to spend time with several other literary figures, including Herman Melville, who was then living at Arrowhead in Pittsfield. Melville is referenced by name in A Wonder-Book: "On the higher side of Pittsfield, sits Herman Melville, shaping out the gigantic conception of his 'White Whale' while the gigantic shape of Graylock [sic] looms upon him from his study-window." Biographer Philip McFarland called this period "by far the most productive creative period of Hawthorne's life", though it also marked the end of his time as a writer of short tales. The Hawthornes would soon move temporarily to West Newton, Massachusetts, where the author would begin to write The Blithedale Romance, a novel he conceived while in Lenox.

In 1853, Hawthorne published Tanglewood Tales, which sometimes carried the full title Tanglewood Tales for Girls and Boys, Being a Second Wonder-Book.

A later edition from 1922 was illustrated by Arthur Rackham.

== Response ==
Illustration preceding the preface in a 1922 edition

Hawthorne wrote A Wonder-Book immediately after The House of the Seven Gables. That novel had sold 6,710 copies by August 1851, and A Wonder-Book sold 4,667 copies in just two months after its November 1851 publication. By comparison, his friend Herman Melville's novel Moby-Dick was released the same month, with the British edition selling under 300 copies in two years, and the American edition under 1,800 in the first year. Hawthorne later authorized a French edition of A Wonder-Book and bought a copy in Marseille while on a European vacation in 1859. He joked in his journal about the purchase of "the two volumes of the Livre des Merveilles, by a certain author of my acquaintance."
