= Hale Passage =

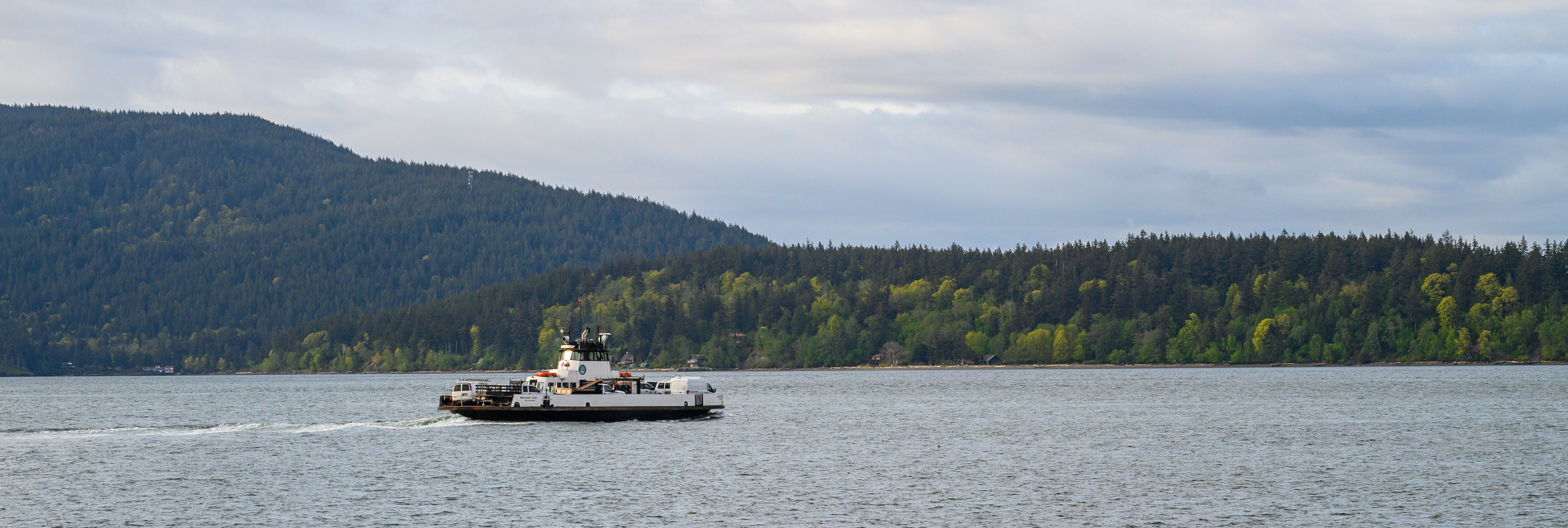
The Whatcom Chief transits the northern Hale Passage between Lummi Island and the mainland.

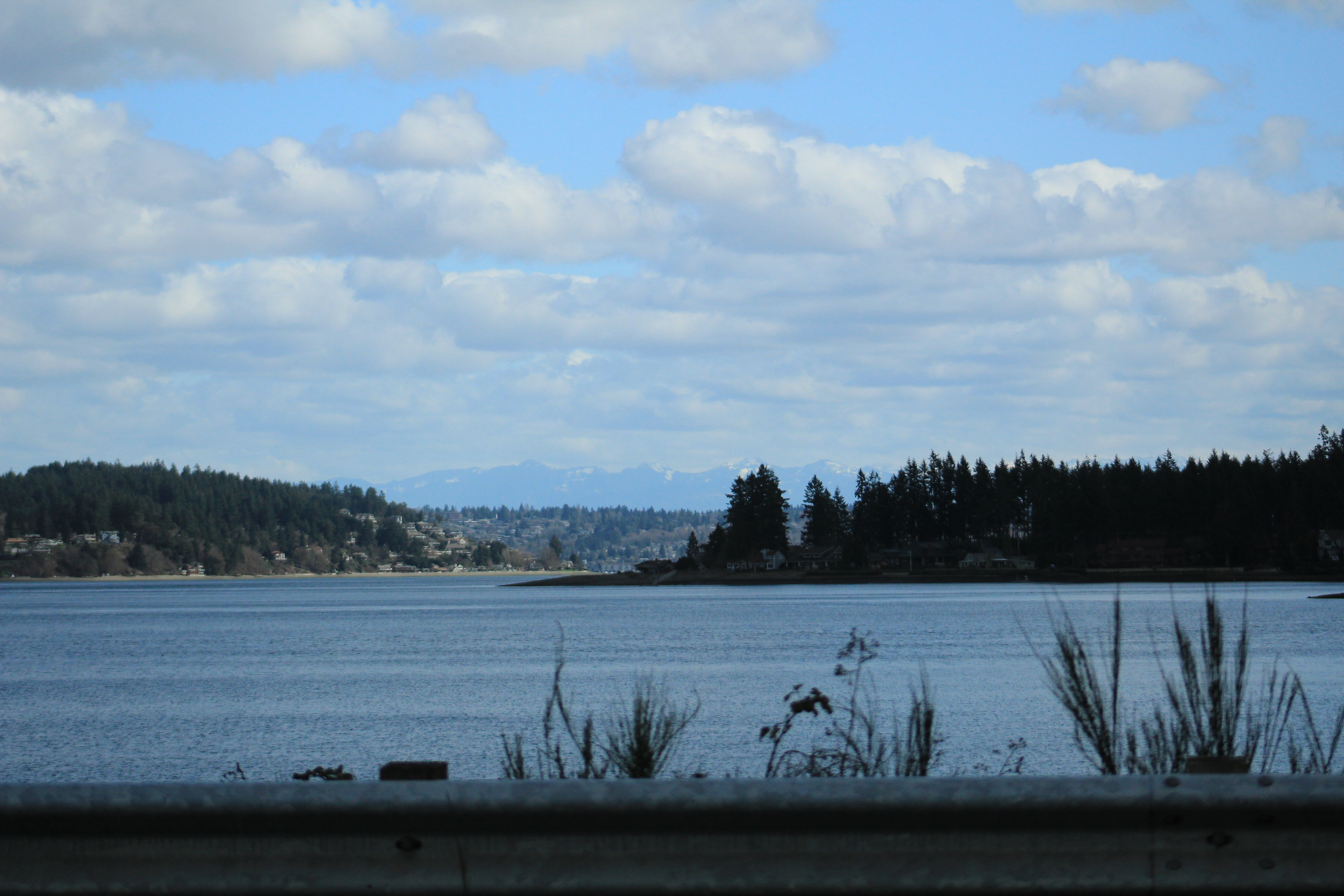
Hale Passage in the South Sound region

Hale Passage is the name of two different bodies of water in Puget Sound, in the U.S. state of Washington.

- In the north Sound, in Whatcom County, Hale Passage separates Lummi Island from the mainland near Bellingham. 48°43′48″N 122°40′46″W
- In the south Sound in Pierce County, another Hale Passage separates Fox Island from the Kitsap Peninsula, near Gig Harbor. 47°16′36″N 122°39′05″W

In both cases, the passages were named by the Wilkes Expedition for ethnologist Horatio Hale.
