= The Menu =

Film by Mark Mylod

- Theatrical release poster
- Directed by: Mark Mylod
- Written by: Seth Reiss; Will Tracy
- Produced by: Adam McKay; Betsy Koch; Will Ferrell
- Starring: Ralph Fiennes; Anya Taylor-Joy; Nicholas Hoult; Hong Chau; Janet McTeer; Judith Light; John Leguizamo
- Cinematography: Peter Deming
- Edited by: Christopher Tellefsen
- Music by: Colin Stetson
- Production companies: Hyperobject Industries; Gary Sanchez Productions
- Distributed by: Searchlight Pictures
- Release dates: September 10, 2022 (TIFF); November 18, 2022 (United States)
- Running time: 107 minutes
- Country: United States
- Language: English
- Budget: $30 million
- Box office: $79.6 million

The Menu is a 2022 American comedy horror film directed by Mark Mylod and written by Seth Reiss and Will Tracy. It stars an ensemble cast consisting of Ralph Fiennes, Anya Taylor-Joy, Nicholas Hoult, Hong Chau, Janet McTeer, Judith Light, and John Leguizamo. It follows a foodie and his date travelling to a remote island to eat at an exclusive restaurant, where the chef has prepared a lavish menu with a shocking surprise for his guests.

The film had its world premiere at the 47th Toronto International Film Festival on September 10, 2022, and was theatrically released in the United States on November 18, 2022, by Searchlight Pictures. It grossed $79.6 million worldwide and received positive reviews from critics. At the 80th Golden Globe Awards, Fiennes and Taylor-Joy were nominated for Best Actor and Best Actress – Musical or Comedy, respectively. The film earned five nominations, including Best Thriller Film, at the 51st Saturn Awards.

== Plot ==
Wealthy foodie Tyler Ledford brings his date Margot Mills to Hawthorn, an exclusive restaurant on a private island operated by celebrity chef Julian Slowik. Their fellow guests are food critic Lillian Bloom and her editor Ted Feldman; wealthy regulars Richard and Anne Liebrandt; washed-up movie star George Diaz and his personal assistant Felicity Lynn; business partners Soren, Dave and Bryce, who work for Slowik's angel investor Doug Verrick; and Slowik’s alcoholic mother Linda. The group is given a tour by maître d'hôtel Elsa, who notes that Margot is not Tyler's original guest.

Dinner begins, and Slowik introduces a series of increasingly unsettling courses. For the third course, uncomfortable truths about each guest are laser-etched on tortillas. Sous-chef Jeremy Louden kills himself at the start of the fourth course, and when Richard tries to leave, the staff cuts off his finger as a warning to the others. Unhappy with Verrick's interference, Slowik has him drowned in front of the guests. The fifth course commences with Slowik allowing himself to be stabbed by Katherine, an employee he sexually harassed. The female guests dine with Katherine while the male guests are given a chance to escape the island, but Slowik's staff catches them all.

Slowik explains that the guests were invited because they have either caused him to lose his passion for his craft or exploited food artisans like himself, and states all will be dead by the night's end. Since Margot's presence was unplanned, Slowik privately gives her the choice of dying with the staff or the guests. When she hesitates, he chooses the staff. Margot admits she is an escort named Erin, whose clients included Richard, who hired her to roleplay as his daughter. Slowik reveals that Tyler was informed the guests would be killed, but was so desperate to experience the restaurant that he hired Margot to replace his ex-girlfriend because Hawthorn does not seat lone diners. Invited to cook by Slowik, Tyler hastily creates an unflattering dish that fails to live up to his pretensions. Humiliated, Tyler leaves the kitchen and hangs himself with his tie.

Slowik sends Margot to the smokehouse to retrieve a barrel needed for dessert. Sneaking into Slowik's living quarters, Margot is attacked by a jealous Elsa, fearing Margot will replace her, resulting in a struggle where Margot fatally stabs Elsa. Margot notices a framed employee of the month award showing a young and happy Slowik cooking hamburgers. She finds a radio and calls for help before returning to the restaurant with the barrel. A Coast Guard officer arrives, convincing the guests they are saved, but reveals himself to be one of Slowik's cooks in disguise. Concocting a plan, Margot accuses Slowik of cooking from obsession rather than a love of food. She complains that the course was not to her liking and she is still hungry. She requests a simple cheeseburger and french fries, which Slowik finds joy in personally preparing. After enjoying one bite, Margot asks to take her food "to go". Slowik boxes it, gives her a gift bag, and allows her to leave.

For the s'mores-inspired dessert course, the staff decorates the restaurant with sauces and crushed graham crackers, dressing the guests in marshmallow stoles and chocolate fezzes. Slowik sets the restaurant ablaze, detonating the barrel and killing himself, the staff and the guests. Watching the fire as she escapes in the Coast Guard boat, Margot eats her cheeseburger and wipes her mouth with a copy of the menu.

== Cast ==
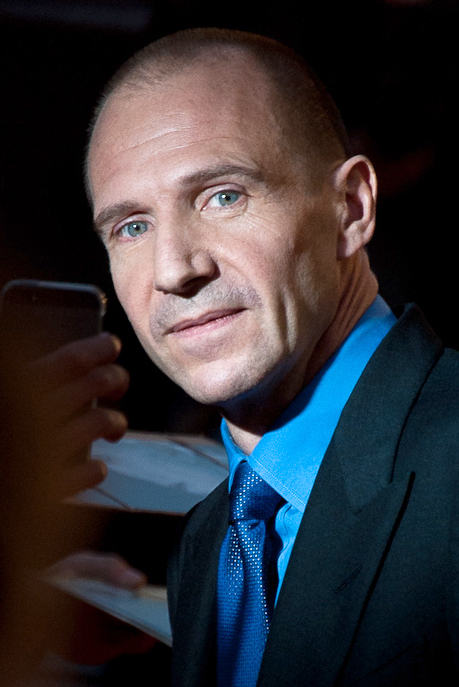
Ralph Fiennes stars as Chef Slowik

- Ralph Fiennes as Chef Slowik
- Anya Taylor-Joy as Margot
- Nicholas Hoult as Tyler
- Hong Chau as Elsa
- Janet McTeer as Lillian
- Paul Adelstein as Ted
- John Leguizamo as a movie star (Note: While his name is mentioned as George Diaz in the film, he is credited simply as "Movie Star" in the end credits.)
- Aimee Carrero as Felicity
- Reed Birney as Richard
- Judith Light as Anne
- Rebecca Koon as Linda
- Rob Yang as Bryce
- Arturo Castro as Soren
- Mark St. Cyr as Dave
- Peter Grosz as sommelier
- Christina Brucato as Katherine
- Adam Aalderks as Jeremy

== Production ==
=== Development ===
Will Tracy dined at Cornelius Sjømatrestaurant, an island restaurant outside Bergen, Norway, during a honeymoon and later suggested a story to Seth Reiss inspired by the experience. Several figures from the world of fine dining were brought on as consultants for the film, including chef Dominique Crenn, who recreated several dishes from her San Francisco restaurant Atelier Crenn for the fictional restaurant Hawthorn, and second unit director David Gelb, who was brought on to recreate the filmmaking style from his Netflix docuseries Chef's Table.

It was announced in April 2019 that Alexander Payne was attached to direct. In December 2019, the screenplay appeared on the annual Black List, a survey showcasing the most popular films still in development. By May 2020, Searchlight Pictures held the distribution rights, and Payne had left the film due to scheduling conflicts, with Mark Mylod replacing Payne as director.

=== Casting ===
In April 2019, it was announced that Emma Stone and Ralph Fiennes would star in The Menu.

In June 2021, Anya Taylor-Joy entered negotiations and was confirmed in July to replace Stone, who had left due to commitments to other projects; Hong Chau and Nicholas Hoult joined the cast the same month. John Leguizamo, Janet McTeer, Judith Light, Reed Birney, Rob Yang, and Aimee Carrero joined in September. In October, Paul Adelstein, Arturo Castro, Mark St. Cyr, Rebecca Koon and Peter Grosz were confirmed as parts of the ensemble.

=== Filming ===
Filming began on September 3, 2021, in Savannah, Georgia, with cinematographer Peter Deming and film editor Christopher Tellefsen. Film locations include the Jekyll Island shore.

=== Music ===
Colin Stetson composed the musical score, released by Milan Records on November 18, coinciding with the film's release.

== Release ==
The Menu premiered at the Toronto International Film Festival on September 10, 2022, and also made its US premiere at Fantastic Fest that month. It was released on November 18, 2022, in the United States in 3,211 theaters, the widest release in Searchlight's history. The film was released to digital platforms on January 3, 2023, with a Blu-ray and DVD release by Walt Disney Studios Home Entertainment on January 17, 2023.

Nielsen Media Research, which records streaming viewership on U.S. television screens, reported that The Menu was streamed for 491 million minutes from January 2–8, 2023, ranking as the third most-streamed film of the week. The streaming aggregator Reelgood, which tracks real-time data from 5 million U.S. users for original and acquired content across SVOD and AVOD services, announced that it was the second most-streamed program in the U.S. for the week ending January 11. JustWatch, a guide to streaming content with access to data from more than 20 million users around the world, announced that The Menu was the second most-streamed horror film in Canada during the Halloween period between October 1, 2022, and October 13, 2025.

== Reception ==
=== Box office ===
The Menu grossed $38.5 million in the United States and Canada, and $41.1 million in other territories, for a worldwide total of $79.6 million.

In the United States and Canada, The Menu was released alongside She Said, and was projected to gross $7–10 million from 3,100 theaters in its opening weekend. It made $3.6 million on its first day, including $1 million from Wednesday and Thursday night previews. The film went on to debut to $9 million, finishing second behind holdover Black Panther: Wakanda Forever. Over its second weekend, The Menu made $5.5 million (and a total of $7.6 million over the five-day Thanksgiving frame), finishing fifth. During its third weekend, the film made $3.5 million, finishing fourth.

=== Critical response ===
On the review aggregator website Rotten Tomatoes, 88% of 336 critics' reviews are positive, with an average rating of 7.5/10. The website's consensus reads: "While its social commentary relies on basic ingredients, The Menu serves up black comedy with plenty of flavor." Metacritic, which uses a weighted average, assigned the film a score of 71 out of 100, based on 45 critics, indicating "generally favorable" reviews. Audiences surveyed by CinemaScore gave the film an average grade of "B" on an A+ to F scale, while those polled by PostTrak gave it a 78% positive score, with 53% saying they would definitely recommend it.

Critics and commentators observed that The Menu's Hawthorn satirized several real-life fine dining restaurants, including the stylized desserts at Alinea, the goodie bag of granola at Eleven Madison Park, the catching of the restaurant's own fish at Fäviken, the "Scandi severity" of Noma and the remote island location of the Willows Inn.

=== Accolades ===
Award	Date of ceremony	Category	Recipient(s)	Result	Ref.
American Cinema Editors	March 5, 2023	Best Edited Feature Film – Comedy or Musical	Christopher Tellefsen	Nominated	
Artios Awards	March 9, 2023	Big Budget – Comedy	Mary Vernieu, Bret Howe, Lisa Mae Fincannon, Kimberly Wistedt & Becca Burgess	Nominated	
Columbus Film Critics Association	January 5, 2023	Best Film	The Menu	9th place	
Columbus Film Critics Association	January 5, 2023	Best Lead Performance	Ralph Fiennes	Nominated	
Columbus Film Critics Association	January 5, 2023	Actor Of The Year (For An Exemplary Body Of Work)	Hong Chau (for The Menu & The Whale)	Runner-up	
Columbus Film Critics Association	January 5, 2023	Actor Of The Year (For An Exemplary Body Of Work)	Anya Taylor-Joy (for Amsterdam, The Menu & The Northman)	Nominated	
Columbus Film Critics Association	January 5, 2023	Breakthrough Film Artist	Hong Chau (The Menu & The Whale: for acting)	Nominated	
Columbus Film Critics Association	January 5, 2023	Best Original Screenplay	Seth Reiss & Will Tracy	Nominated	
Columbus Film Critics Association	January 5, 2023	Frank Gabrenya Award for Best Comedy	The Menu	Nominated	
Critics' Choice Super Awards	March 16, 2023	Best Actor in a Horror Movie	Ralph Fiennes	Won	
Dorian Awards	February 23, 2023	Unsung Film of the Year	The Menu	Nominated	
Eddie Awards	March 5, 2023	Best Edited Feature Film (Comedy, Theatrical)	Christopher Tellefsen	Nominated	
Fangoria Chainsaw Awards	May 21, 2023	Best Screenplay	Seth Reiss & Will Tracy	Nominated	
Fantastic Fest	September 27, 2022	Audience Award	The Menu	Won	
Georgia Film Critics Association	January 13, 2023	Oglethorpe Award for Excellence in Georgia Cinema	Mark Mylod, Seth Reiss, Will Tracy	Runner-up	
Golden Globe Awards	January 10, 2023	Best Actor in a Motion Picture – Musical or Comedy	Ralph Fiennes	Nominated	
Golden Globe Awards	January 10, 2023	Best Actress in a Motion Picture – Musical or Comedy	Anya Taylor-Joy	Nominated	
Hawaii Film Critics Society	January 13, 2023	Best Picture	The Menu	Nominated	
Hawaii Film Critics Society	January 13, 2023	Best Actor	Ralph Fiennes	Nominated	
Hawaii Film Critics Society	January 13, 2023	Best Actress	Anya Taylor-Joy	Nominated	
Hawaii Film Critics Society	January 13, 2023	Best Original Screenplay	Seth Reiss & Will Tracy	Nominated	
Hollywood Critics Association	February 24, 2023	Best Comedy	The Menu	Nominated	
Hollywood Critics Association	February 24, 2023	Best Original Screenplay	Seth Reiss & Will Tracy	Nominated	
Hollywood Critics Association Creative Arts Awards	February 24, 2023	Best Casting Director	Mary Vernieu and Bret Howe	Nominated	
Hollywood Music in Media Awards	November 16, 2022	Best Original Score in a Horror Film	Colin Stetson	Nominated	
IFMCA Awards	February 23, 2023	Best Original Score for a Horror/Thriller Film	Colin Stetson	Nominated	
Indiana Film Journalists Association	December 19, 2022	Best Original Screenplay	Seth Reiss & Will Tracy	Nominated	
Indiana Film Journalists Association	December 19, 2022	Best Supporting Performance	Ralph Fiennes	Nominated	
London Film Critics' Circle	February 5, 2023	British/Irish Actor of the Year (for body of work)	Ralph Fiennes	Nominated	
Make-Up Artists and Hair Stylists Guild	February 11, 2023	Best Contemporary Make-Up in a Feature-Length Motion Picture	Deborah LaMia Denaver, Mazena Puksto, Donna Cicatelli, Deb Rutherford	Nominated	
Make-Up Artists and Hair Stylists Guild	February 11, 2023	Best Contemporary Hair Styling in a Feature-Length Motion Picture	Adruitha Lee, Monique Hyman, Kate Loftis, Barbara Sanders	Nominated	
Online Association of Female Film Critics	December 20, 2022	Best Acting Ensemble	The Menu	Nominated	
Portland Critics Association	January 16, 2023	Best Ensemble Cast	The Menu	Nominated	
San Diego Film Critics Society	January 6, 2023	Best Actor	Ralph Fiennes	Nominated	
San Diego Film Critics Society	January 6, 2023	Best Original Screenplay	Seth Reiss & Will Tracy	Nominated	
San Diego Film Critics Society	January 6, 2023	Best Ensemble	The Menu	Nominated	
Satellite Awards	March 3, 2023	Best Actor in a Motion Picture – Comedy or Musical	Ralph Fiennes	Nominated	
Saturn Awards	February 4, 2024	Best Thriller Film	The Menu	Nominated	
Saturn Awards	February 4, 2024	Best Film Direction	Mark Mylod	Nominated	
Saturn Awards	February 4, 2024	Best Film Writing	Seth Reiss and Will Tracy	Nominated	
Saturn Awards	February 4, 2024	Best Actor in a Film	Ralph Fiennes	Nominated	
Saturn Awards	February 4, 2024	Best Actress in a Film	Anya Taylor-Joy	Nominated	
St. Louis Film Critics Association	December 18, 2022	Best Original Screenplay	Seth Reiss & Will Tracy	Nominated	
Sunset Circle Awards	November 29, 2022	Best Supporting Actress	Hong Chau (for The Menu & The Whale)	Nominated	
Sunset Circle Awards	November 29, 2022	Best Film	The Menu	Nominated	
Sunset Circle Awards	November 29, 2022	Best Ensemble	The Menu	Nominated	
Sunset Circle Awards	November 29, 2022	Best Screenplay	Seth Reiss & Will Tracy	Runner-up	
Writers Guild of America Awards	March 5, 2023	Best Original Screenplay	Seth Reiss & Will Tracy	Nominated	

== Viewership ==
According to data from Showlabs, The Menu ranked third on Netflix in the United States during the week of 3–9 February 2025.
