= Lummi Island =

Island in the Salish Sea, northwest Washington, United States

- Lummi Island

Geography
- Location: Puget Sound
- Coordinates: 48°41′N 122°40′W
- Area: 23.97 km^{2} (9.25 sq mi)

Administration
- United States
- Whatcom County, Washington

Demographics
- Population: 905 (2019)

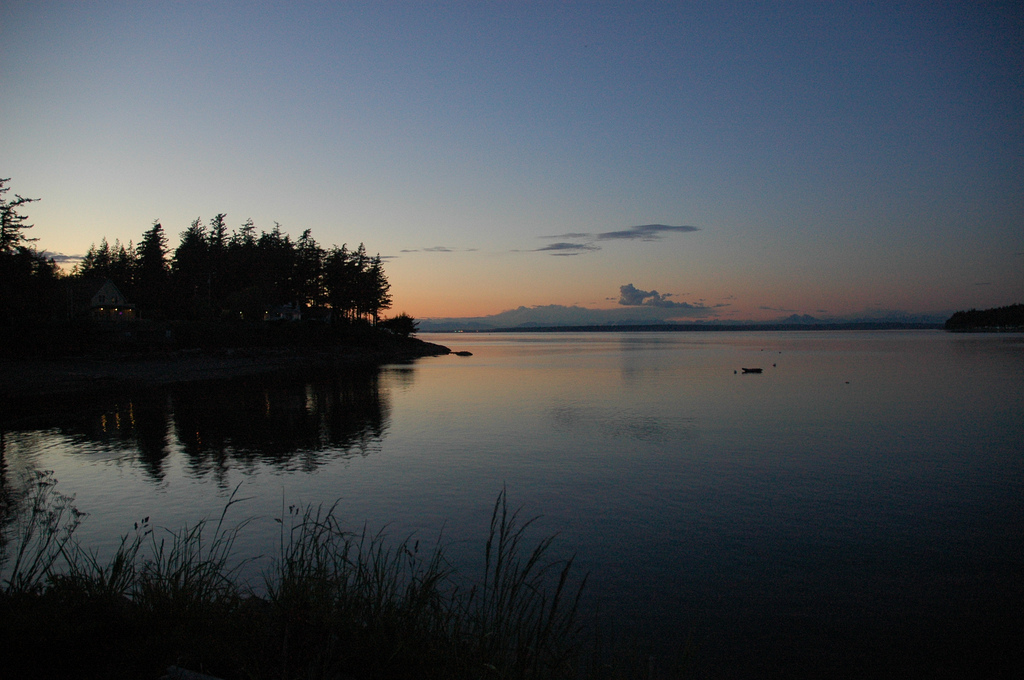
View from Lummi Island

Lummi Island lies at the southwest corner of Whatcom County, Washington, United States, between the mainland part of the county and offshore San Juan County. The Lummi Indian Reservation is situated on a peninsula east of the island, but it does not include Lummi Island. The island has a land area of 23.97 square kilometres (9.25 square miles) and had a population of 822 as of the 2000 census. The population nearly doubles in summer when second-home owners from Canada and the U.S. arrive for the summer months.

The island is accessible by a 20-car ferry, the Whatcom Chief, run by Whatcom County Public Works. It is a 6-minute passage from Gooseberry Point on the mainland to the island.

Public education for island residents is provided by the Ferndale School District. It operates one elementary school (K-5) on the island, Beach Elementary School. Middle and high school students must travel to attend schools on the mainland.

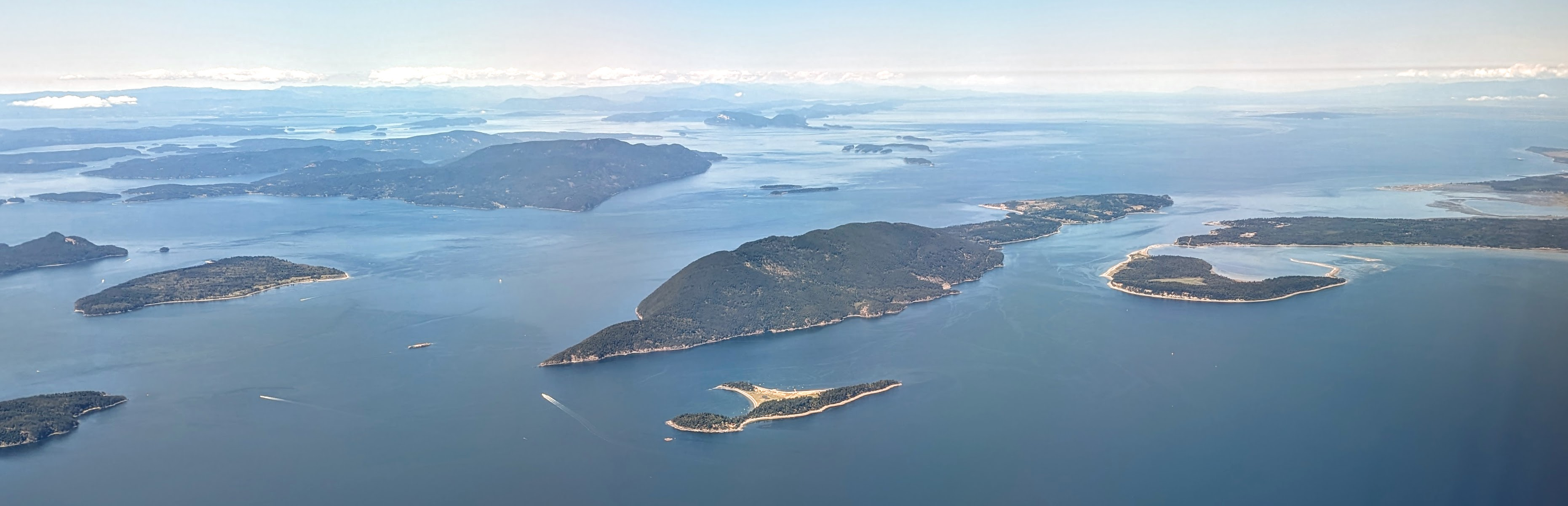
Aerial view of Lummi Island and vicinity from the east, with Eliza Island in foreground, Portage Island to the right near the Lummi Peninsula, Sinclair Island to the left, and Orcas Island behind

== History ==
The island was originally called Sa nam a o ("High Mountain") and Skallaham by the native Lummi people.

In 1792 Spanish explorers dubbed it Isla de Pacheco, and British colonists later called it McLoughlin Island. In 1853, the U.S. National Geodetic Survey charted the island as Lummi, naming it after the local tribe. Later British Canadians and Americans adopted this term. Some theories suggest the name was derived from a Lummi-language word.

The island's post office was established by the United States government in 1882. At that time the town and post office were named "Beach", after Wade S. Beach, a homesteader in the area, but today island mail is addressed to "Lummi Island, Washington". The Beach School and Beach Store Cafe have retained the older name, and the GNIS lists Beach as an unincorporated place.

By 1919, the Nooksack Fish Packing Company had a cannery on the island at Sunrise Cove.

=== Lummi Island Quarry ===
A rock quarry on the island was operated intermittently, but major operations started in 1964. By 1990 the pit was 3 acres, and mining rights were sold to James and Kyle Bride of Everett, Washington. The operation became Ace Rock, LLC in 1997, with the Brides, Dick Christopherson (Bremerton, Washington), and David Grainger (British Columbia, Canada). The underlying land was sold in 1999 to the Brides and Christopherson. In 2005, Valley View Sand and Gravel, Inc. (owned by the three families) assumed ownership of the land.

The Lummi Island Quarry was operated until 2013 by Aggregates West, Inc. of Everson, owned by Grainger. Aggregates West went into Chapter 11 bankruptcy, having defaulted in 2012 on $3.5 million in Frontier Bank (inherited by Union Bank) loans originated in 2005. Aggregates West offloaded barges of excavated rock at Bellingham, Anacortes, Everett, and Seattle). By 2007 only 10% of the output was used on the island.

Lummi Island Heritage Trust, a land trust, sought to purchase the land for reclamation and conservation purposes. The trust successfully purchased the 105 acres in 2015 for $1.08 million. The purchase was also supported by Whatcom County, Puget Sound marine and Nearshore Grant Program, and the Rose Foundation, to restore the property. Some is still covered with forests and there are 4,000 feet of shoreline.

By 2019 the land trust named the area the Aiston Preserve, after an Aiston family that homesteaded the land in the 1940s.

== Culture ==
Lummi Island is best known for its unique reef net salmon fishery developed by the indigenous Lummi of the area. It has an eclectic population of artists, seascapes, and rural settings. The island's narrow, scenic and winding roads are popular with bicyclers. A trail to Lummi Mountain takes hikers through the Baker Preserve to views of the San Juan and Gulf Islands. The trail is maintained by the Lummi Island Heritage Trust.

Facilities on the island include a general store, two restaurants, several bed and breakfast houses, a small library, a post office, a fire station, a church, a Salvation Army camp, and a vintage 1919 elementary school. The historic Lummi Island Congregational Church has a quiet, wooded cemetery.

The Willows Inn, opened in 1910, was upgraded to a fine dining restaurant in 2010 under chef Blaine Wetzel, who co-owned it. Restaurant employees complained about workplace conditions, and in 2017 the restaurant was fined by the United States Department of Labor and required to end its internship program. In late 2022, after allegations of abuse were again reported and settled, the Inn was closed and according to reports will be donated to a local non-profit.

=== Events ===
The island hosts a weekly farmers' market in the spring and summer, a chili festival in mid-July, and a Christmas party for island children.

Lummi Island is home to numerous artists. Some conduct studio tours on Memorial Day weekend, Labor Day weekend, and the second weekend in November.

== Geography ==
=== Topography ===
Lummi Island is a long narrow island with a mountainous southern side, rising to about 500 feet (152 m) above sea level, and a flatter, lower northern side, which averages only about 150 feet (46 m). The island is about 8.7 miles (14 km) long and about 1.5 miles (2.4 km) wide. The northern side widely comes from the Chuckanut Formation, a fluvial sedimentary formation from the Eocene, and the Everson Glaciomarine Drift, a glacial drift that occurred during the Pleistocene as part of the Fraser glaciation. Separated by a fault, the southern side of the island is made up of rock from the Lummi Formation, largely metagreywacke, shale, and siltstone from the Cretaceous period.

=== Climate ===
The climate in this area has mild differences between highs and lows, with wet winters and dry summers. According to the Köppen Climate Classification system, Lummi Island has a marine west coast climate, abbreviated "Cfb" on climate maps.

=== Groundwater resources ===
Groundwater is an important source of freshwater on Lummi Island. Hydrological research has examined groundwater conditions in the northern part of the island, where groundwater serves as a primary source of potable water. The study identified multiple aquifers and documented seasonal groundwater shortages in some wells, as well as localized cases of seawater intrusion. Ground water availability and protection have consequently been important considerations in the island's land-use and growth-management planning.

== Transportation ==
The Whatcom Chief is a ferry that transports vehicles and passengers from Lummi Island to Gooseberry Point. It is run by the county government and can carry 100 passengers and 20 vehicles.

In the 1950s, Whatcom County proposed the construction of a bridge to replace the ferry service. The state government also authorized Washington State Ferries to run a ferry between Lummi and Orcas islands following the completion of the bridge.
