= Whatcom Chief =

Ferry serving Lummi Island, Washington, US

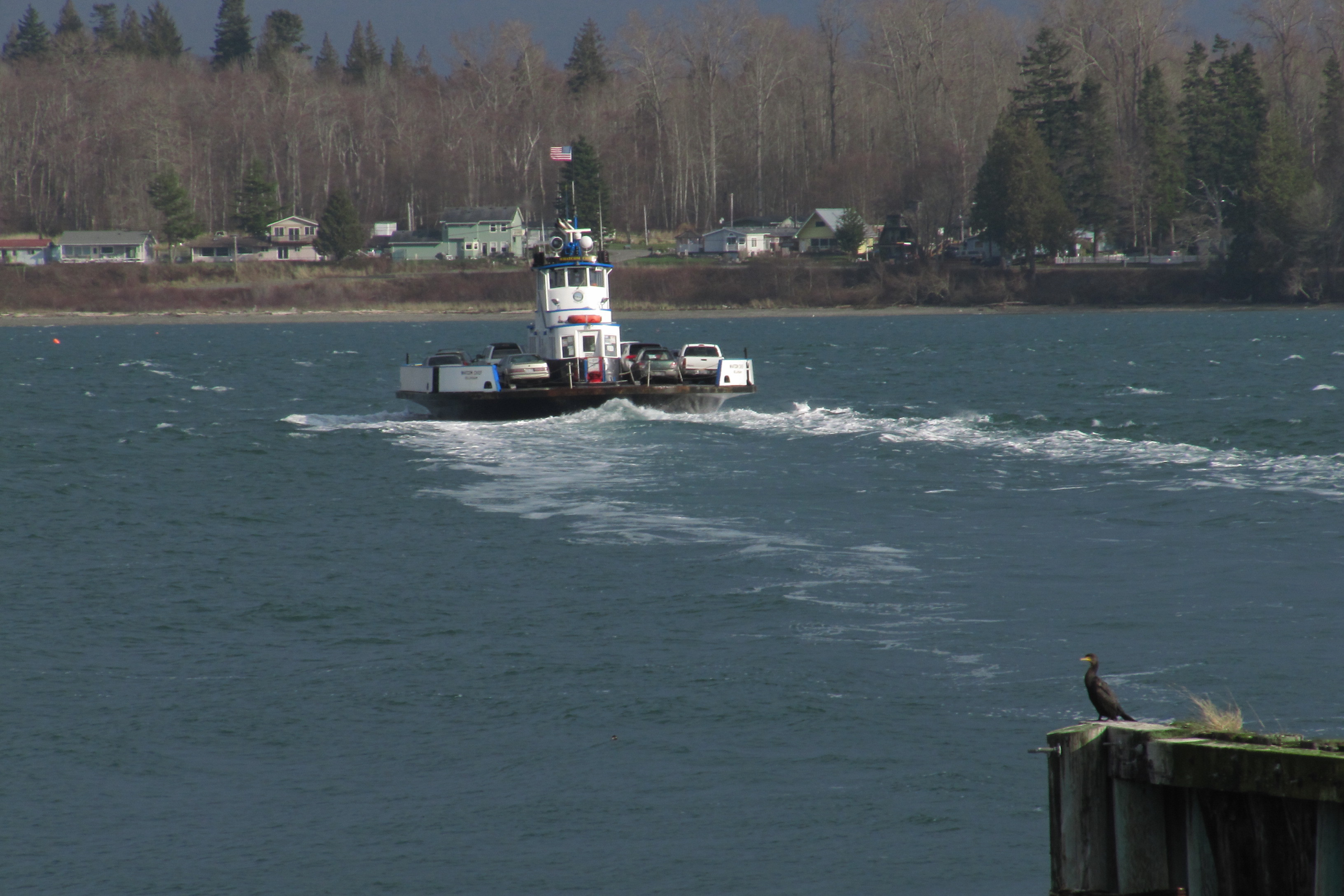
Whatcom Chief en route to Gooseberry Point

The Whatcom Chief is a ferry in Washington state, United States. The ferry carries both pedestrians and vehicles to Lummi Island from Gooseberry Point west of Bellingham, Washington.

The Gooseberry Point terminal is situated on land belonging to the Lummi Nation.

A 35-year lease was agreed between Whatcom County and the Lummi Nation in September 2011. John Stark, writing in The Bellingham Herald, criticized Whatcom County for the cost of the lease, and for failing to push the Lummi Nation to take it to court by interpreting some Federal precedents that may have allowed access to the ferry terminal without a leasing fee.

Normally the voyage takes eight minutes. The ferry can accommodate 20 vehicles and 100 pedestrian passengers. The ferry service is occasionally disrupted due to bad weather as well as propane deliveries as the fuel truck must ride across on the ferry alone.

== Vessel ==
The Whatcom Chief was built in 1962 by the T. J. Larsen Steel Company in Bellingham, Washington. It is 93.5 feet (28.5 m) long and can carry up to 20 vehicles and 100 passengers. The Chief is planned to be replaced by a new vessel in the 2020s. The $35 million project, which includes remodeled docks, will be funded by an increased fare and grants from the state legislature's 2022 transportation package. On September 17, 2026, the US Department of Transportation granted Whatcom County $25 million of federal funding for the purpose of replacing the Chief, covering half of the cost of the project.
