= Staging (cooking) =

Unpaid internship of a cook

Staging (/ˈstɑːʒɪŋ/ STAH-zhing) is an unpaid internship test when a cook or chef works briefly for free (or to gain a position) in another chef's kitchen to learn and be exposed to new techniques and cuisines.

The term originates from the French word stagiaire meaning trainee, apprentice or intern. The French term commis is often used interchangeably with the aforementioned terms. The individual completing this activity is referred to as a stage, stagiaire ([staʒjɛʁ]), commis (assistant chef) or volontaire ("volunteer").

== Process ==
Staging is similar to trialling in professional kitchens. Trialling is an activity often used to assess the skills and training of a cooking job candidate. The hiring chef might assess the trial cook's adaptive skills in the new kitchen and how they interact with other staff in the restaurant. When a culinary student or cook-in-training is seeking an internship, often the trial is the next step after the interview.

A server or waiter can also "stage" in a restaurant for much the same purpose.

== History ==
Before the advent of modern culinary schools, young cooks learned their craft as unpaid apprentices in professional restaurant kitchens and bakeries (and other food preparation establishments: pastry shops/patisserie, butcher shops/boucherie, candy shops/confisserie, hotels, etc.) under the guidance of a mentoring chef. This practice has become less common in recent decades.

== See also ==
- Apprenticeship – System for training new crafts-people
- Internship – Period of work experience
- Mentorship – Guidance relationship
- Probation period – Status given to new employees of a company or business
