= Sonora (disambiguation) =

Sonora is a state in Mexico.

Sonora may also refer to:

== Geography ==
=== Cities and towns ===
- Sonora, Arizona
- Sonora, Arkansas
- Sonora, California
- Sonora, Kentucky
- Sonora, Missouri, a ghost town
- Sonora, Ohio, an unincorporated community
- Sonora, Texas
- Sonora, Mato Grosso do Sul, a town in Brazil
- Sonora, Nova Scotia, Canada

=== Other geography ===
- Republic of Sonora, a former federal republic in northern Mexico
- Sonoran Desert, a desert in northwestern Mexico and the southwestern United States
- Sonora Island, one of the Discovery Islands in British Columbia, Canada
- Sonora Pass, a pass through the Sierra Nevada mountains in California
- Sonora Reef, a reef off the west coast of Grays Harbor County, Washington
- Sonora River, a river in Sonora, Mexico

== Other uses ==
- Sonora (snake), genus of snakes in the family Colubridae
- Sonora High School (disambiguation)
- Sonora, a Spanish schooner captained by Juan Francisco de la Bodega y Quadra
- Sonora (Mexico City Metrobús), a BRT station in Mexico City

== See also ==
- Sonoma (disambiguation)
