= List of marine protected areas of Washington =

State and federally managed ocean reserves

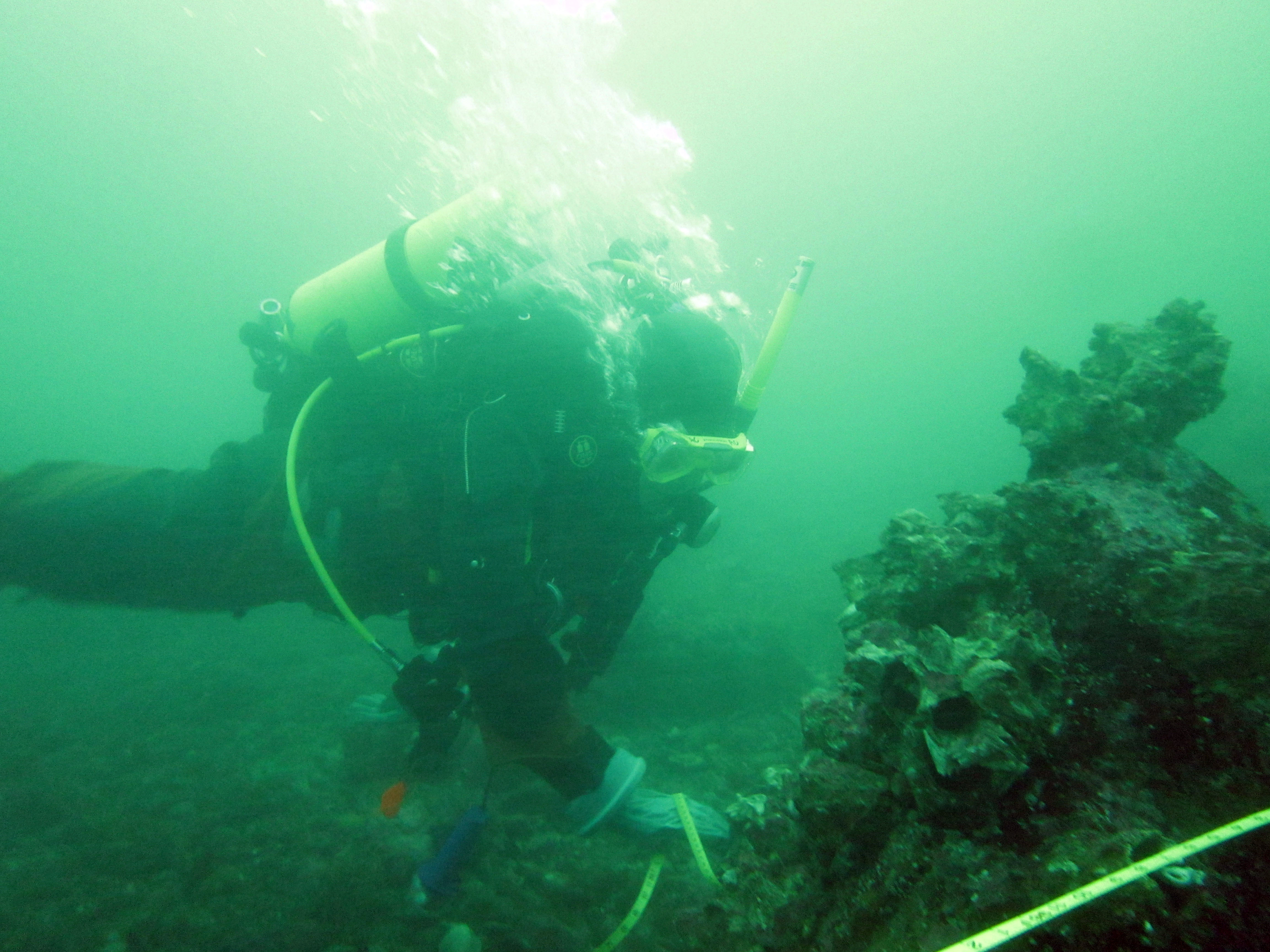
EPA divers work to remove abandoned fishing gear from Puget Sound

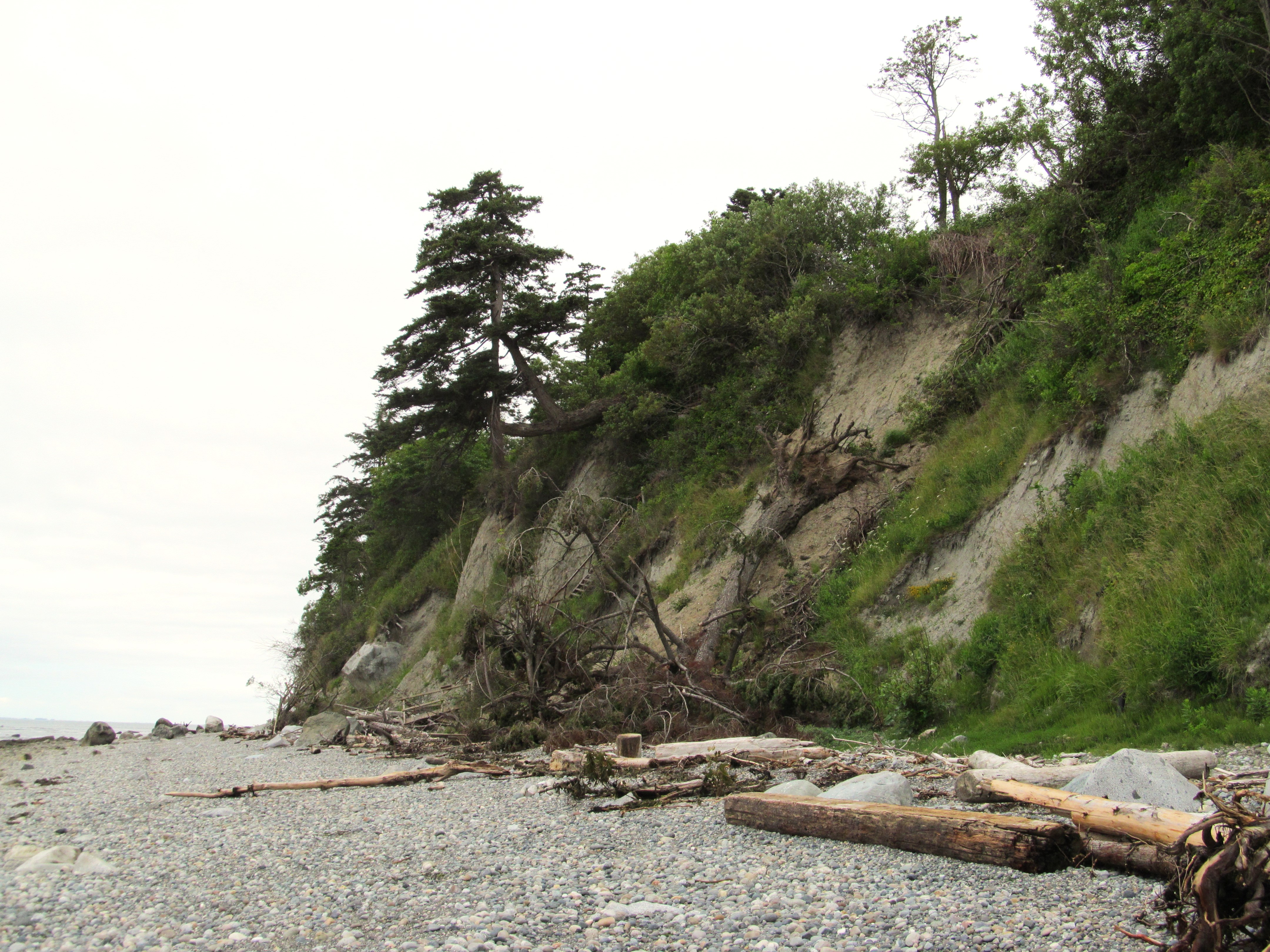
Trees falling off of cliffside at Whatcom County-managed Point Whitehorn Marine Reserve

There are county, state and federal marine protected areas off the coast of Washington. The state marine reserves are managed by the Washington Department of Fish and Wildlife; aquatic reserves are managed by the Washington Department of Natural Resources, and marine state parks are managed by Washington State Parks.

== Federally protected marine areas ==
- Olympic Coast National Marine Sanctuary
- Washington Maritime National Wildlife Refuge Complex
  - Flattery Rocks National Wildlife Refuge
  - Quillayute Needles National Wildlife Refuge
  - Copalis National Wildlife Refuge
  - Dungeness National Wildlife Refuge
  - Protection Island National Wildlife Refuge
  - San Juan Islands National Wildlife Refuge
- Deception Pass Underwater Park

== State protected marine areas ==
=== Marine conservation areas ===
- Brackett's Landing Shoreline Sanctuary Conservation Area
- City of Des Moines Park Conservation Area
- Keystone Conservation Area
- Octopus Hole Conservation Area
- Orchard Rocks Conservation Area
- Saltar's Point Beach Conservation Area
- South 239th Street Park Conservation Area
- Sund Rock Conservation Area
- Waketickeh Creek Conservation Area

=== Marine preserves ===
- Admiralty Head Marine Preserve
- Argyle Lagoon Marine Preserve
- Carkeek Park Marine Preserve
- Colvos Passage Marine Preserve
- Discovery Park Marine Preserve
- Emma Schmitz Marine Preserve
- False Bay Marine Preserve
- Friday Harbor Marine Preserve
- Golden Gardens Park Marine Preserve
- Lincoln Park Marine Preserve
- Richey Viewpoint Marine Preserve
- Saltwater State Park Marine Preserve
- Shaw Island Marine Preserve
- Titlow Beach Marine Preserve
- Toliva Shoal Marine Preserve
- Yellow and Low Islands Marine Preserve
- Z's Reef Marine Preserve

=== Aquatic reserves ===
- Cherry Point State Aquatic Reserve
- Cypress Island State Aquatic Reserve
- Fidalgo Bay State Aquatic Reserve
- Maury Island State Aquatic Reserve
- Nisqually Reach State Aquatic Reserve
- Protection Island State Aquatic Reserve
- Smith and Minor Islands State Aquatic Reserve
- Lake Kapowsin State Aquatic Reserve (freshwater)

=== Marine state parks ===
- Blake Island Marine State Park
- Blind Island Marine State Park
- Clark Island Marine State Park
- Cutts Island Marine State Park
- Eagle Island Marine State Park
- Doe Island Marine State Park
- Hope Island Marine State Park
- James Island Marine State Park
- Jones Island Marine State Park
- Matia Island Marine State Park
- McMicken Island Marine State Park
- Mystery Bay Marine State Park
- Patos Island Marine State Park
- Posey Island Marine State Park
- Saddlebag Island Marine State Park
- Skagit Island Marine State Park
- Stuart Island Marine State Park
- Sucia Island Marine State Park
- Turn Island Marine State Park

=== Sea Urchin and Sea Cucumber Exclusion Zones ===
- Hale Passage
- Haro Strait
- Low Point
- Marine Area 12
- San Juan and Upright Channels
- Tatoosh Island

=== Pacific Octopus Protection Areas in Puget Sound ===
- Alki Beach Junkyard
- Alki Beach Seacrest Coves 1, 2, and 3
- Days Island
- Deception Pass
- Les Davis
- Marine Area 12
- Redondo Beach
- Three Tree Point

== County and municipal marine protected areas ==
- Lighthouse Marine Park, Whatcom County
- Lily Point Marine Park, Whatcom County
- Maury Island Marine Park, King County
- Point Whitehorn Marine Reserve, Whatcom County

== See also ==
- List of Washington state parks
- List of lighthouses in Washington (state)
- List of marine protected areas of California
- List of marine protected areas of Oregon
- List of marine protected areas of Hawaii
- List of marine protected areas of Alaska
- List of U.S. National Marine Sanctuaries
