= Point Grenville =

Headland of Washington, U.S.

Point Grenville Point Haynisissos
- Headland
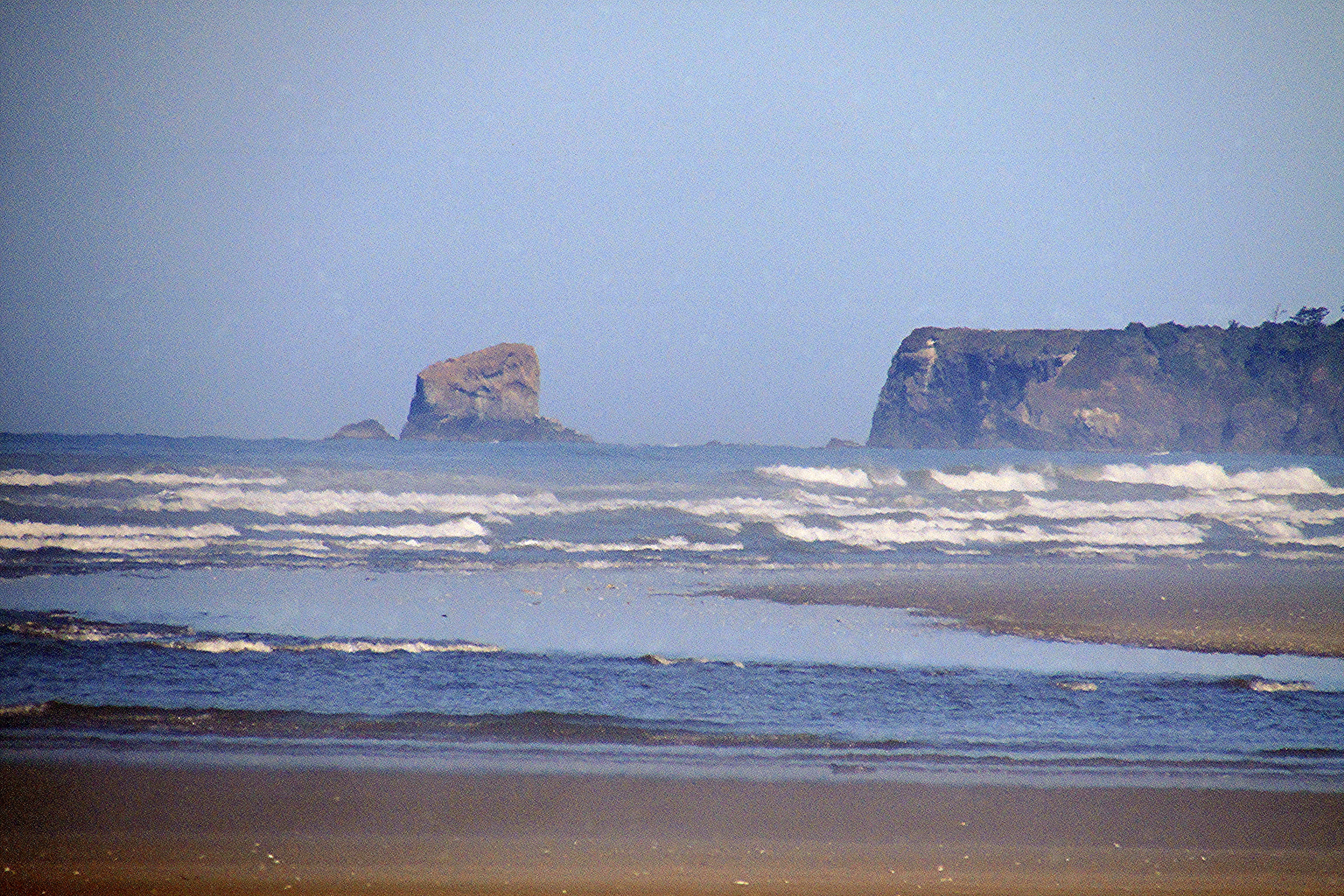
- Point Grenville from the south along the coast at Moclips
- Interactive map of Point Grenville
- Coordinates: 47°18′15″N 124°17′43″W
- Location: Washington, United States
- Part of: Coast Range; Quinault Formation
- Water bodies: Grenville Bay; Taholah Bay; Pacific Ocean
- Age: Eocene
- Geology: Volcanic bedrock and breccia
- Etymology: William Wyndham Grenville, 1st Baron Grenville
- Operator: Quinault Indian Nation
- Elevation: 37 m (120 ft)

Point Grenville is a headland of Washington state, located on the central portion of the Olympic Peninsula, between Taholah to the north and Moclips to the south. One of the major promontories on the Washington coast, it is in the Quinault Indian Nation, with the community of Santiago nearby. The area is part of the Copalis National Wildlife Refuge and the Olympic Coast National Marine Sanctuary. Since 2013, it has been called Point Haynisisoos by the Quinault Nation, home to the tribal access-only Haynisisoos Park.

It became the site of the first European landing in what would become Washington state on July 12, 1775, during the expedition of Bruno de Heceta and Juan Francisco de la Bodega y Quadra on behalf of the Spanish Empire.

== Geology ==
The cliffs at Point Grenville are 120 feet (37 m) high and numerous sea stacks composed of volcanic rock protrude in the water surrounding the headlands, sometimes called "volcanic breccia". The volcanic composition makes the point more resistant to erosion than many other elements of the coastline, preserving an ancient landscape. Fossils found in the siltstone beds formed from the ancient ocean floor suggest that they date to 45 to 50 million years ago (during the Eocene epoch), some of the oldest found on the Washington coast. The feature is dominated by consolidated bedrock, with both sandy beaches and boulder fields in the vicinity. Deep cracks and folds create an uneven, pockmarked terrain.

On top of the point, the ground slopes seaward, as the headland formed from a larger seaward outcropping that eroded 17,000 or more years ago. At its maximum extent the headland likely extended several miles west into the Pacific Ocean. Piddocks, a tidal species of bivalve mollusc, have formed borings in the uplifted bedrock surface.

To the south, the point creates a sheltered bay, called Grenville Bay, and along the shore a long, sandy headland-bay beach, also called a logarithmic spiral beach, extends for about four miles. The beach is typically called Point Grenville Beach south to the mouth of the Moclips River. The promontory serves as a dividing point on the Washington coast between the rocky coastline to the north and the sandier, wider beaches and spits south of the point.

At least four of the offshore sea stacks are named. The largest and most prominent is Grenville Arch, a sea stack with a visibly tunneled appearance located about 0.5 miles (800 m) southwest. Grenville Pillar is closer to shore, only 300 yards (270 m) southwest from the point, and is about 0.25 acres (0.10 ha) in size. Two other stacks, located to the southeast, are called Erin Islet and Erin's Bride. They are grass-covered and smaller than either Grenville Arch or Grenville Pillar.

== History ==
=== Pre-contact and mythology ===
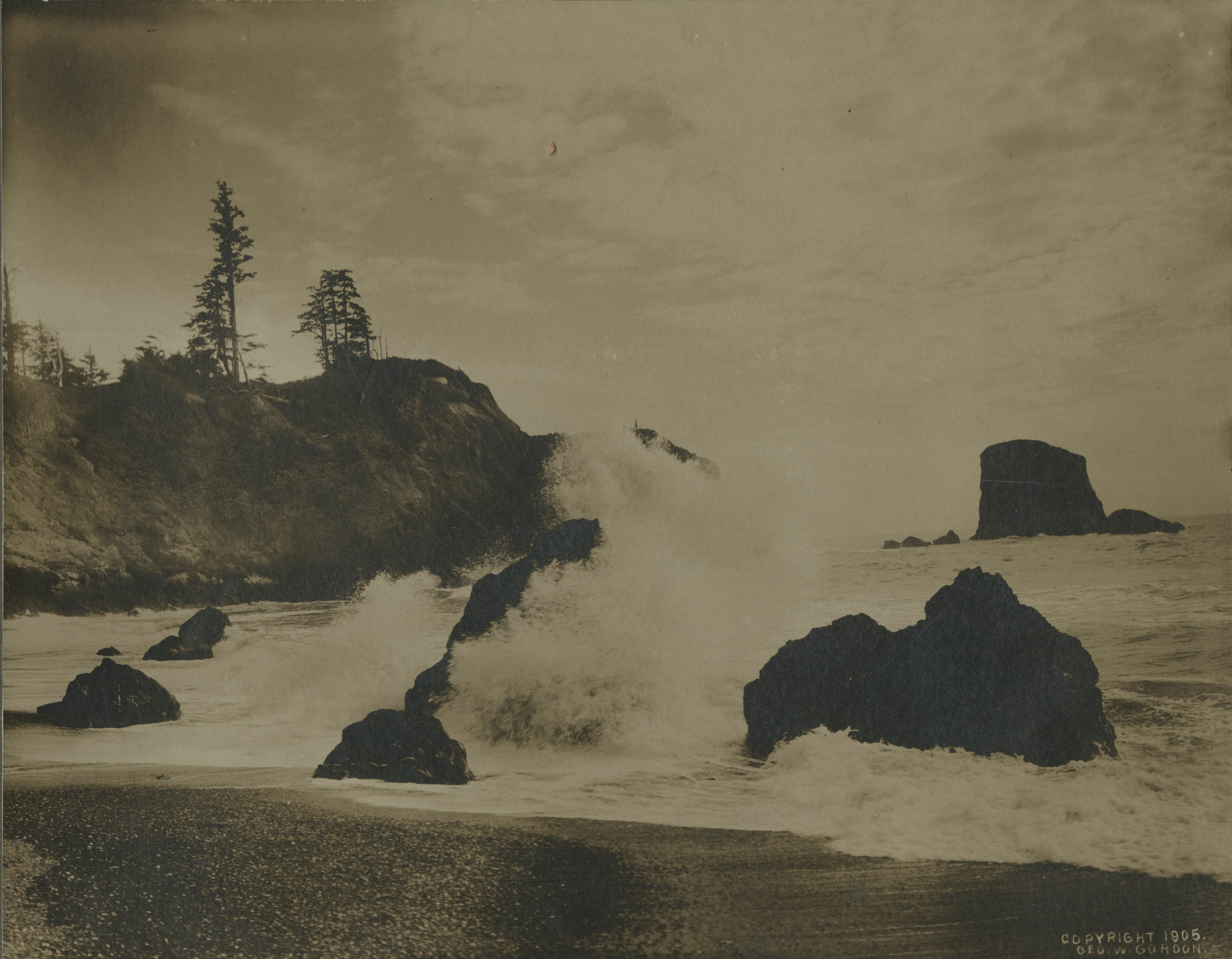
Point Grenville, 1905

Prior to European contact, the point and the area around it were inhabited by the Quinault people. There are a variety of names for different features of the headland in the Quinault language. The southern face is called a’tsak, meaning "Inside Point," the north face is called o’lȧmixʷci’tks, meaning "Soft Sand Point". The sea stacks off shore were also named and frequently included in the stories of the Quinault. The tallest rock is called ma'tsactsiolxk, meaning "Shag's house." Another rock offshore is believed to be the remains of a woman who waited for a husband on a seal-hunt who never returned. Point Grenville and Grenville Bay are spiritually significant to the Quinault people, with the point held as a sacred location for rites of passage, in particular rites of female puberty. Another story recalled in the late 19th century described a northern (Hoh) spirit coming south to Point Grenville in the form of a sea bird, becoming half ocean spirit while flying over the water, and revealing Hoh and Makah songs to a man on a vision quest. The point has also been used as a lookout and hunting ground for sea otters, clams, bird eggs and fish. Along the bay, there is a small creek that the Quinault call no'’xaliɫȧn, meaning "Leave-canoe (creek)," as it was the site where otter-hunters would prepare their hunt. This creek was also mythologically significant to the Quinault, as it ran next to a rock pile on Grenville Beach called tsa'tcȧmaɫ ("hole dug") where, in their origin of death narrative, Eagle buried his son.

=== First European landing in present-day Washington ===
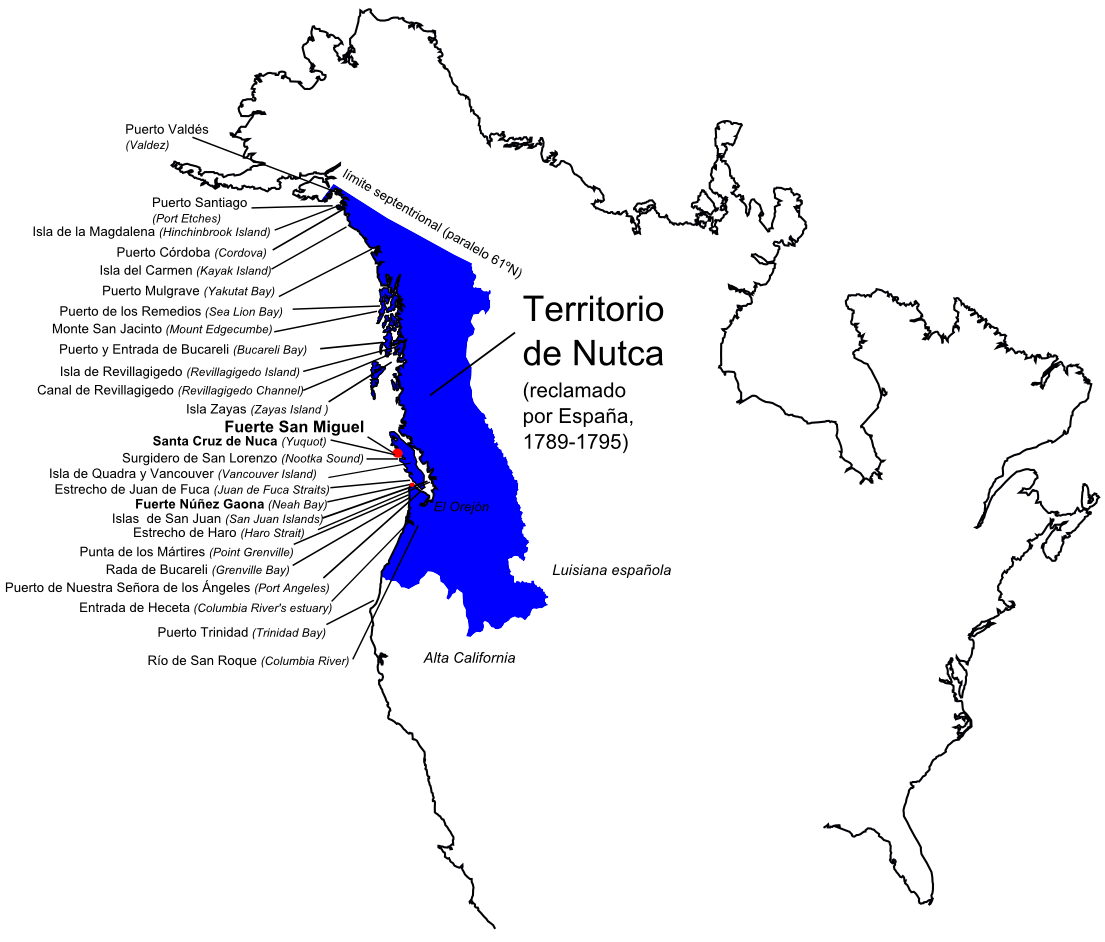
Spanish claims in the Pacific Northwest in the late 18th century, including Punta de los Mártires and Rada de Bucareli

On July 12, 1775, the expedition of Bruno de Heceta, Juan Francisco de la Bodega y Quadra, and Francisco Antonio Mourelle anchored the Santiago and Sonora near Grenville Bay with some difficulty, owing to the many underwater shoals in the shallows, now called the Sonora Reef for the Spanish schooner. They sent a large party ashore, becoming the first Europeans to set foot on what is now Washington state. Heceta and Benito de la Sierra, a Catholic priest, performed a ceremony claiming the land for the Kingdom of Spain, specifically Nueva Galicia, the Spanish designation for the Pacific Northwest at the time. Heceta named their landing spot Rada de Bucareli, or Bucareli Cove, in honor of the Viceroy of New Spain at the time, Antonio María de Bucareli y Ursúa. The next day, a smaller party came ashore to resupply. Quadra reports that this smaller party of six men was attacked by a group of several hundred Quinaults who killed four and wounded the other two such that they succumbed to their injuries while swimming back to the ships. More of the local Quinault then surrounded the ships in canoes as they made an effort to depart through the shoals of the bay. Quadra called the spot Punta de los Mártires ("Point of the Martyrs") after the Spanish sailors killed in the Quinault attack. In November 1989, the state of Washington placed a historical marker at Point Grenville in recognition of the state's centennial and the first Europeans to reach its shores.

=== Vancouver expedition and naming ===
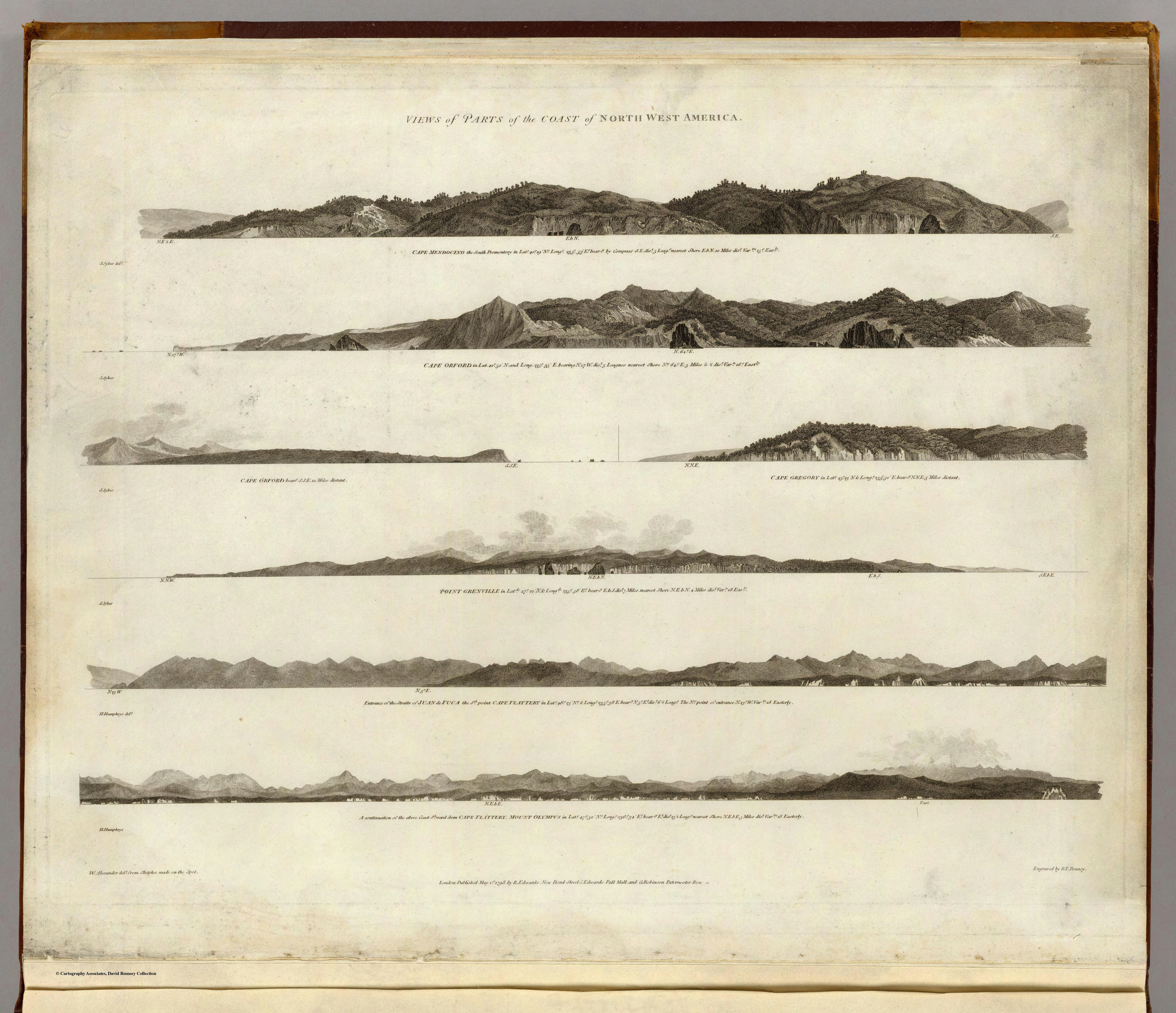
Engraving from the Vancouver expedition, including Point Grenville

The 1791-1795 expedition of George Vancouver passed by on April 28, 1792. Vancouver listed the promontory as Point Grenville on his charts after William Wyndham Grenville, 1st Baron Grenville, then Leader of the House of Lords and Foreign Secretary of the United Kingdom. He was a close personal friend of Vancouver who had just been raised to peerage before the expedition set out. Vancouver published a profile engraving of the point, created by draughtsman Benjamin Thomas Pouncy, in his work recollecting the expedition, A Voyage of Discovery. That same year, during the Nootka Crisis, Spanish explorers Dionisio Alcalá Galiano and Cayetano Valdés encountered the point en route to Nootka Sound and called it Punta de la Bastida ("Point of the Bastion"), owing to its fort-like appearance. In the 19th century and into the early 20th, there was some variation in the spelling of Vancouver's name for the point, with variants including "Granville," "Greenville, and "Grennville". In 2013, the Quinault Nation renamed the headland to Point Haynisisoos, meaning “thundering elk" in Quinault, after tribal elder Phillip E. Martin, who was known by that name. He was an advocate for the point's preservation and significance to the tribe.

=== 20th century ===
In 1919, the point was listed as "reserved for lighthouse purposes" on a plat map, but no lighthouse was built at that time. A fire lookout tower called Point Grenville Lookout was established up the windward slope to the east of the point prior to 1930, when an access road was constructed. In 1953, the structure was described as a 77 foot steel tower steel structure with 4 steel legs, but by 1962 the Washington State Highway Commission reported that it was abandoned and in disrepair. As of 2020, the structure is no longer extant, though there are still footings and rotted wood present where it once stood.

Located at the heart of the Graveyard of the Pacific, Grenville Bay has been the site of many shipwrecks over the years, largely as a result of the same shoals noted by Bodega y Quadra and Heceta in 1775. One notable wreck near the point was that of the freighter SS Seagate in 1956.

Beginning in June 1945, a United States Coast Guard LORAN-A (long-range) hyperbolic radio station for offshore navigation was located at the point. It began as a Mobile Unit, but permanent buildings were erected in 1946, and re-constructed in 1954. The first pulse recurrence rates were 2H4, paired with Cape Blanco, Oregon and 2H5, paired with Spring Island, British Columbia (near Kyuquot) but in 1971 these were changed to broadcast at 1L0 and 1L1, respectively. The Coast Guard station was also home to a United States Weather Bureau Cooperative Observer Program (COOP) site beginning in 1948. The first lighthouse at the point, Point Grenville Light, was erected in 1967 (LLNR 109). After a reduction in scale at the LORAN station beginning in 1976, operations (including the COOP site) fully ceased in December 1979, and the station was officially disestablished in March 1980. The light was automated from that point on. At its peak in 1948, the station was home to one commissioned officer and 19 enlisted personnel.

The 1974 film McQ, starring John Wayne, was filmed in part at Point Grenville.

== Ecology ==
Point Grenville is an intertidal study site for the Multi-Agency Rocky Intertidal Network (MARINe), and the Olympic Coast National Marine Sanctuary has conducted Long-Term Monitoring Surveys there since 2008. Target aquatic species include common acorn barnacles, California mussels, surfgrass, and Ochre stars. It is also home to large Sitka spruce trees.

Copalis National Wildlife Refuge, which includes the outlying rocks of Point Grenville, was one of the earliest National Wildlife Refuges, having been created alongside Flattery Rocks National Wildlife Refuge and Quillayute Needles National Wildlife Refuge by President Theodore Roosevelt in 1907.

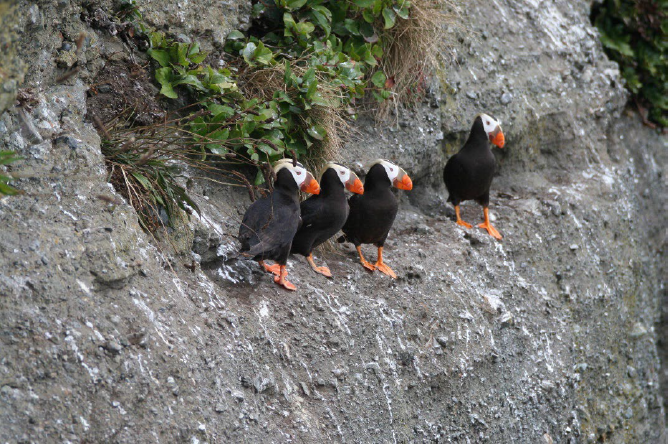
Tufted puffins in the Olympic Coast National Marine Sanctuary

The vulnerable population of seabirds that nest in the area that are of particular ecological concern, including migrating Caspian terns and sooty shearwaters during fall and spring migrations. In the summer breeding period the outlying rocks and coastal bluffs are nested by black oystercatchers, common murres, and tufted puffins. Other birds that nest at the point include Western grebes, Palm warblers, sooty fox sparrows, pigeon guillemot and pelagic cormorants.

The beach was the site of several sea otter derricks, tall structures on which sharpshooters stood to hunt otters for their fur, until the fur trade was outlawed in 1911. On July 31, 1969, 29 sea otters were translocated from Amchitka Island to Washington, and released at Point Grenville. The translocated population, including 30 released at La Push in 1970, is estimated to have declined to between 10 and 43 individuals before increasing, reaching 208 individuals in 1989. As of 2017, the population was estimated at over 2,000 individuals, and their range extends from Point Grenville in the south to Cape Flattery in the north and east to Pillar Point along the Strait of Juan de Fuca.

The Pacific razor clam, which lives in the sands of Point Grenville Beach, is a particularly important resource for the local Quinault Nation for both culinary and commercial use. The clams are harvested by tribal members under the supervision of the Quinault Department of Fisheries. Quality of the clam crop began to decline in the early 2000s due to hypoxia, or low oxygen conditions, resulting from upwells of deep sea water. The Olympic Coast National Marine Sanctuary works with the Quinault Nation to aid in the conservation of razor clams and facilitate their sustainable harvest.

== Tourism ==
The point is home to the tribal access-only Haynisisoos Park on the site of the former LORAN station, which now features a totem pole carved from an 800-year-old Western red cedar, dedicated to Emmett Oliver, a Quinault Tribal Elder. It served as the terminus for the Paddle to Quinault event in 2013, part of the annual Tribal Canoe Journey. This event saw nearly 15,000 people gather at the point to watch the arrival of 89 canoes, representing around 100 Northwest tribes and Canadian First Nations, as well as native Hawaiian and Māori groups.

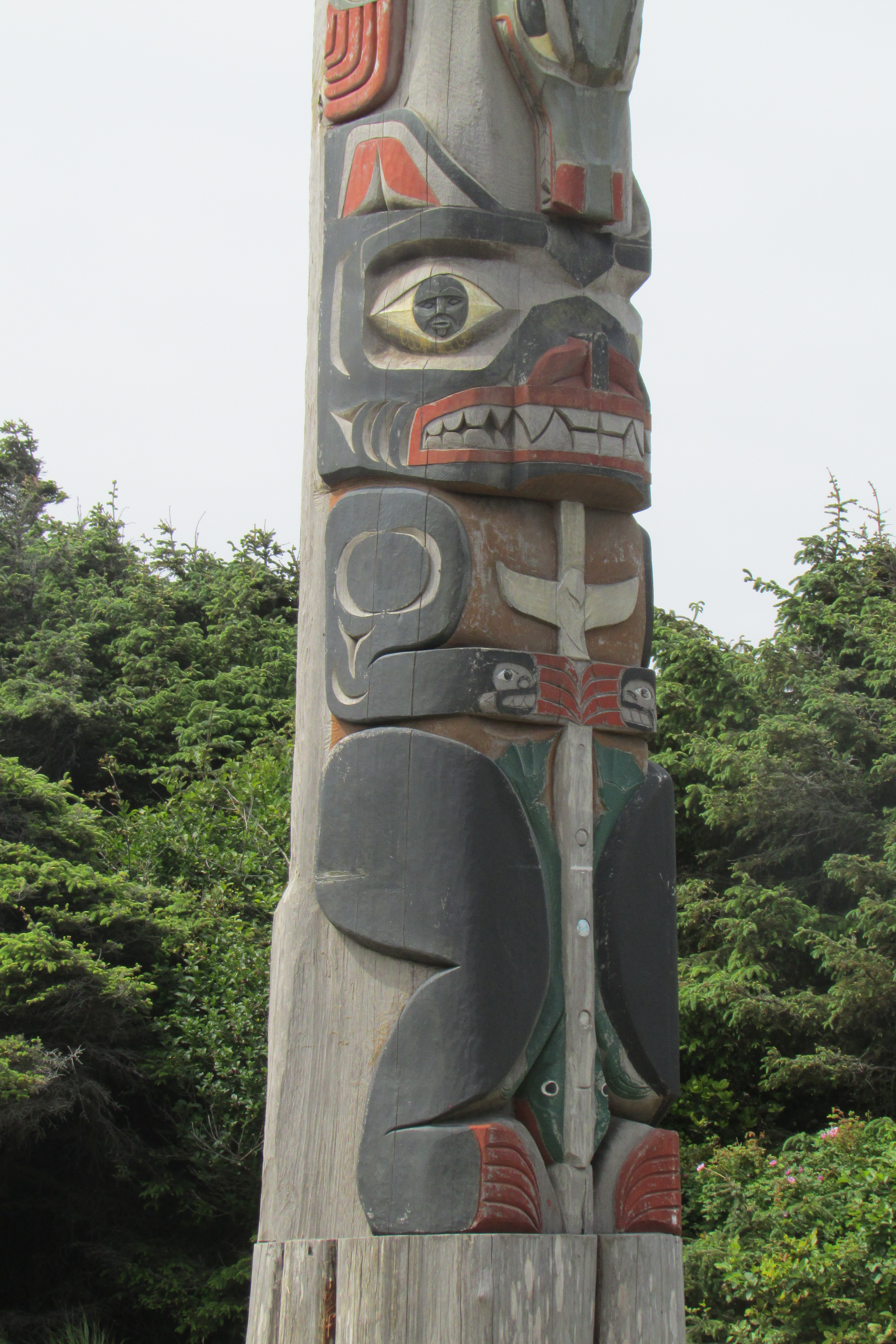
Detail of the Totem Pole at Haynisisoos Park, erected during the 2013 Paddle to Quinault

Point Grenville has been a tourist attraction since at least the early twentieth century. Automobile tours to the point and Taholah were available to visitors at nearby beaches in the area in the 1910s. Historic Washington state outdoors club The Mountaineers began visiting around the 1920s. It has been featured on postcards since the 1910s, first with illustrations and later with photographs, including images of surfers on the beach around 1963. Prior to the late 1960s, the beach at Point Grenville was a popular surfing and recreation destination with the general public. Surfers first noted its consistent surf in the 1940s and 1950s, with its popularity booming by 1960. In 1970, it was featured on a post card for the last time, published by the Smith-Western Company in Tacoma, Washington.

Issues with non-indigenous tourists defiling the area by littering, putting graffiti on sacred rocks, defacing petroglyphs and destroying clam beds, led to the closure of the beach to the public in August 1969. Until 2012, the beach was still accessible to the public with a tribal pass, but this was further restricted to preserve the ecology of the coastline. Accompaniment by an enrolled member of the Quinault Nation is now required for access to both the beach and point. The 1969 decision was upheld by the Washington State Office of the Attorney General in 1970, despite a long-held customary use rule regarding access to ocean beaches in Washington State, on the basis of an 1873 Executive Order by President Ulysses S. Grant that withdrew the reservation’s lands from the public domain.

== Gallery ==
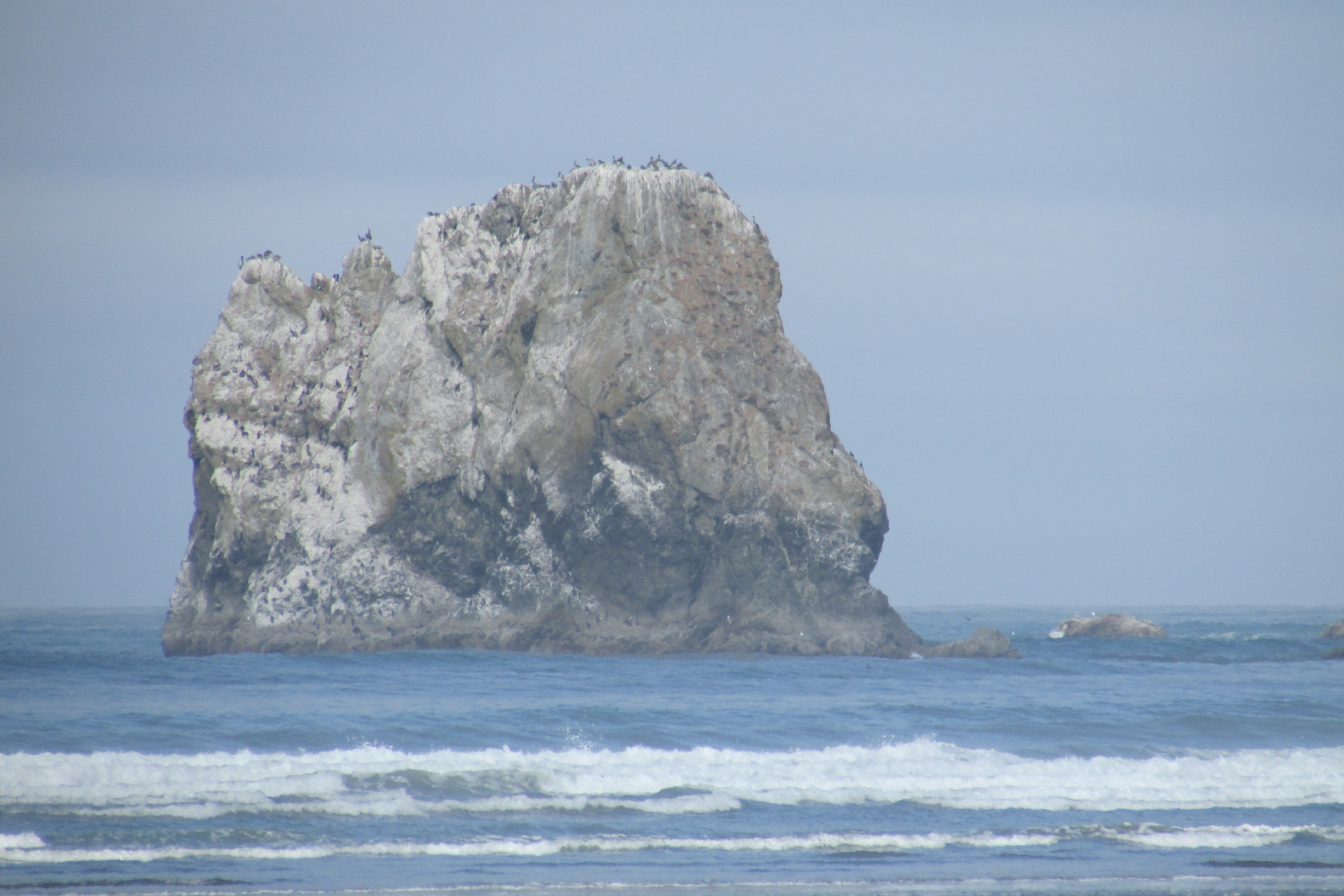
Sea birds nesting on a massive sea stack off Point Grenville

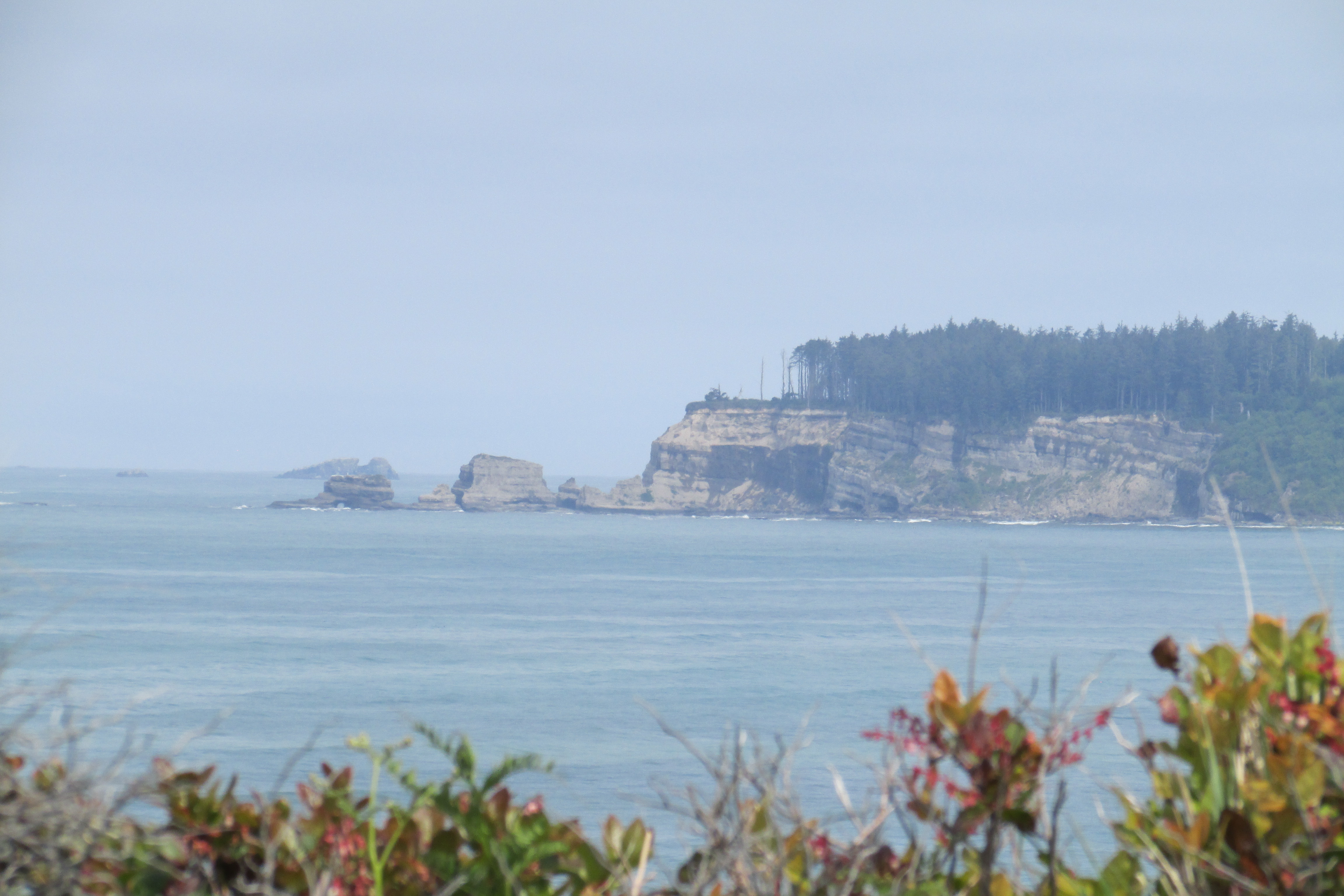
The view north toward Cape Elizabeth and Taholah Bay from atop Point Grenville

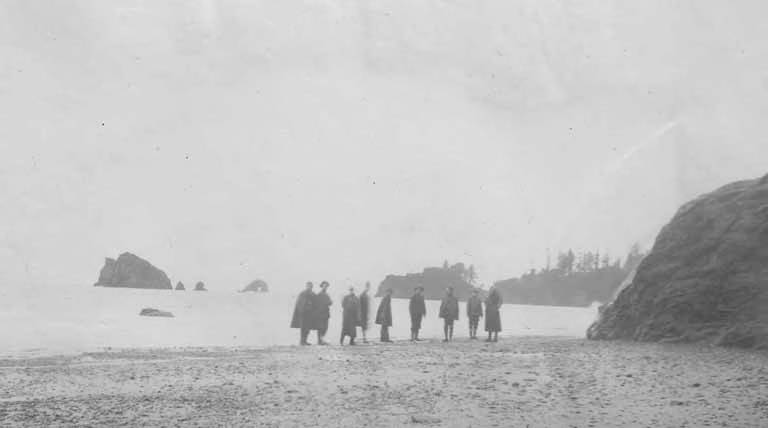
Tourists at Point Grenville in 1911

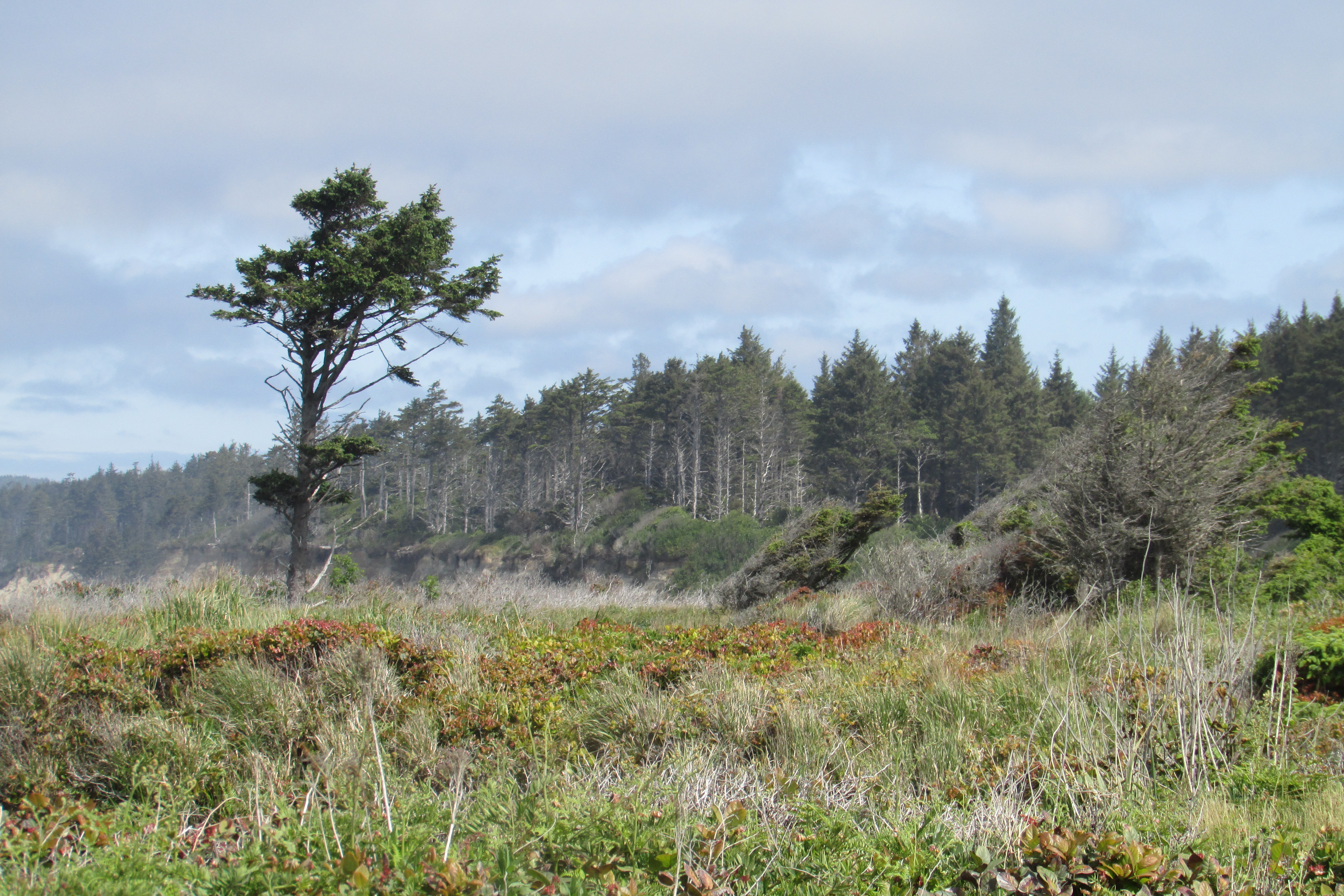
A Sitka spruce atop Point Grenville

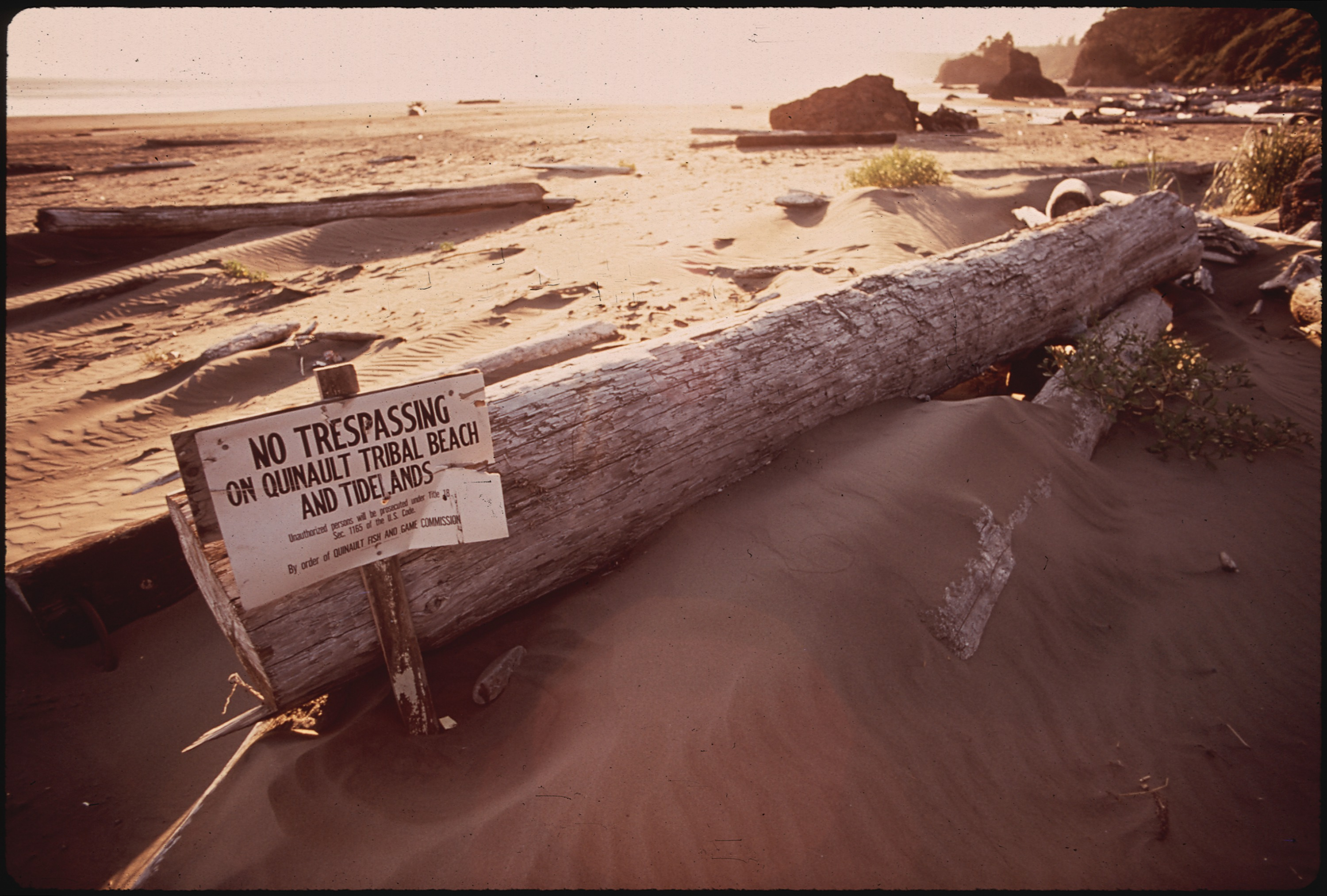
A notice of beach closure from 1972, shortly after the restriction was imposed
