= Sonoma =

Sonoma may refer to:

- Sonoma (beetle), a genus of beetles
- Sonoma County, California, a county in northern California in the United States
- Sonoma, California, the city for which the county is named
- Sonoma Valley, the region in Sonoma County in which Sonoma is the largest settlement and only incorporated city
- Sonoma State University, in Rohnert Park, Sonoma County, California
- USS Sonoma, various United States Navy ships
- GMC Sonoma, a model of pickup truck
- Sonoma, the code name for an Intel Centrino platform
- Sonoma Mountains, in Sonoma County, California
- Sonoma Raceway, a motor racing course and dragstrip in the Sonoma Mountains
- Sonoma Range, mountain range in Nevada
  - Sonoma Peak, mountain peak in Nevada, the highest mountain in the above range
- Sonoma Adventist College, a college in Papua New Guinea
- macOS Sonoma, an operating system by Apple
- Sonoma, a turnkey digital audio workstation system made by Sony for SACD or DSD production
- Sonoma Goods for Life, a private label brand sold by Kohl's

== See also ==
- Sonora (disambiguation)
