= Santiago, Washington =

- Census-designated place
- Location within Washington (state) Location within the United States
- Coordinates: 47°17′51″N 124°13′58″W
- Country: United States
- State: Washington
- County: Grays Harbor

Area
  - Total: 1.57 sq mi (4.06 km^{2})
  - Land: 1.57 sq mi (4.06 km^{2})
  - Water: 0 sq mi (0.0 km^{2})
- Elevation: 243 ft (74 m)

Population (2020)
  - Total: 52
  - Density: 33/sq mi (13/km^{2})
- Time zone: UTC-8 (Pacific (PST))
  - Summer (DST): UTC-7 (PDT)
- ZIP Code: 98587
- Area code(s): 360, 564
- FIPS code: 53-61235
- GNIS feature ID: 2585033

Santiago is a census-designated place (CDP) in Grays Harbor County, Washington, United States, named after Joseph Santiago. The population was 52 at the 2020 census, up from 42 at the 2010 census.

The community is in the Quinault Indian Nation in western Grays Harbor County, along State Route 109, next to the Pacific Ocean. SR 109 leads north 5 miles (8 km) to its northern terminus at Taholah and south 5 miles (8 km) to Moclips. Point Grenville, a 120-foot-high (37 m) cliff rising from the ocean, is 2.5 miles (4.0 km) north of Santiago and is the site of the Quinault Nations' Haynisisoos Park. The Copalis National Wildlife Refuge occupies the ocean and rocks seaward from the coastline along Santiago and environs.

According to the U.S. Census Bureau, the Santiago CDP has an area of 1.57 square miles (4.06 km^{2}), all of it land.

== Demographics ==
Historical population
| Census | Pop. | Note | %± |
|---|---|---|---|
| 2010 | 42 | | — |
| 2020 | 52 | | 23.8% |
U.S. Decennial Census; 2000 2010

Santiago first appeared as a census designated place in the 2010 U.S. census.

=== Racial and ethnic composition ===
Santiago CDP, Washington – Racial and ethnic composition Note: the US Census treats Hispanic/Latino as an ethnic category. This table excludes Latinos from the racial categories and assigns them to a separate category. Hispanics/Latinos may be of any race.
| Race / Ethnicity (NH = Non-Hispanic) | Pop 2010 | Pop 2020 | % 2010 | % 2020 |
|---|---|---|---|---|
| White alone (NH) | 18 | 9 | 42.86% | 17.31% |
| Black or African American alone (NH) | 0 | 3 | 0.00% | 5.77% |
| Native American or Alaska Native alone (NH) | 17 | 35 | 40.48% | 67.31% |
| Asian alone (NH) | 0 | 0 | 0.00% | 0.00% |
| Native Hawaiian or Pacific Islander alone (NH) | 0 | 0 | 0.00% | 0.00% |
| Other race alone (NH) | 0 | 0 | 0.00% | 0.00% |
| Mixed race or Multiracial (NH) | 2 | 0 | 4.76% | 0.00% |
| Hispanic or Latino (any race) | 5 | 5 | 11.90% | 9.62% |
| Total | 42 | 52 | 100.00% | 100.00% |

== Education ==
It is in the Taholah School District.
