= Cape Falcon =

Cape Falcon (French: Cap Falcon) may refer to:

- Cape Falcon in Algeria
- Cape Falcon in Oregon, USA
- Cape Falcon Marine Reserve in Oregon, USA
