= Protection Island =

Protection Island may refer to:

- Protection Island (Nanaimo) an island near Nanaimo, BC, Canada
- Protection Island (Washington state), an island north of Discovery Bay, Wa, USA
