= List of marine protected areas of Hawaii =

State and federally managed ocean reserves

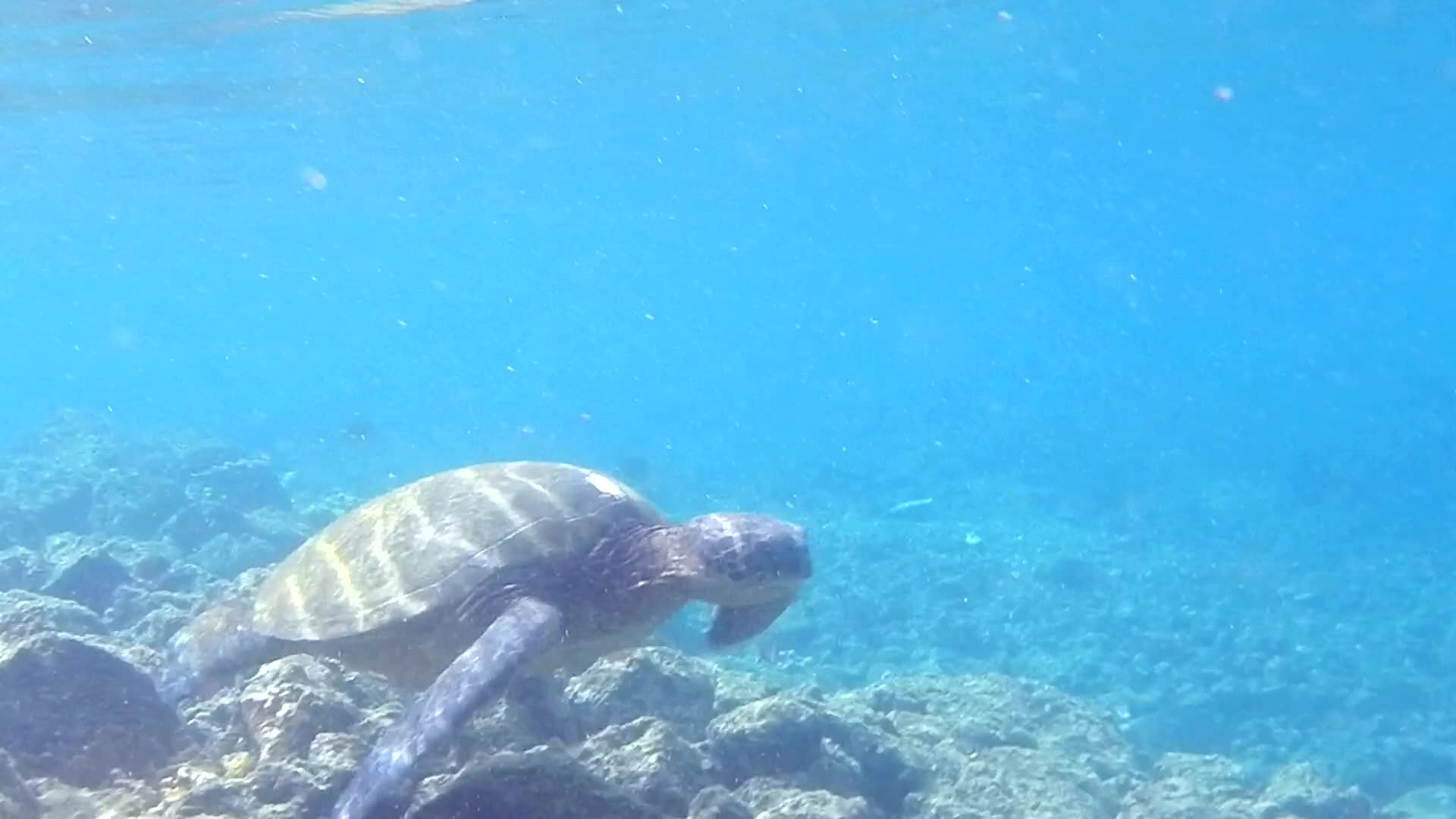
A sea turtle at Wai'opae Marine Life Conservation District, Hawaii

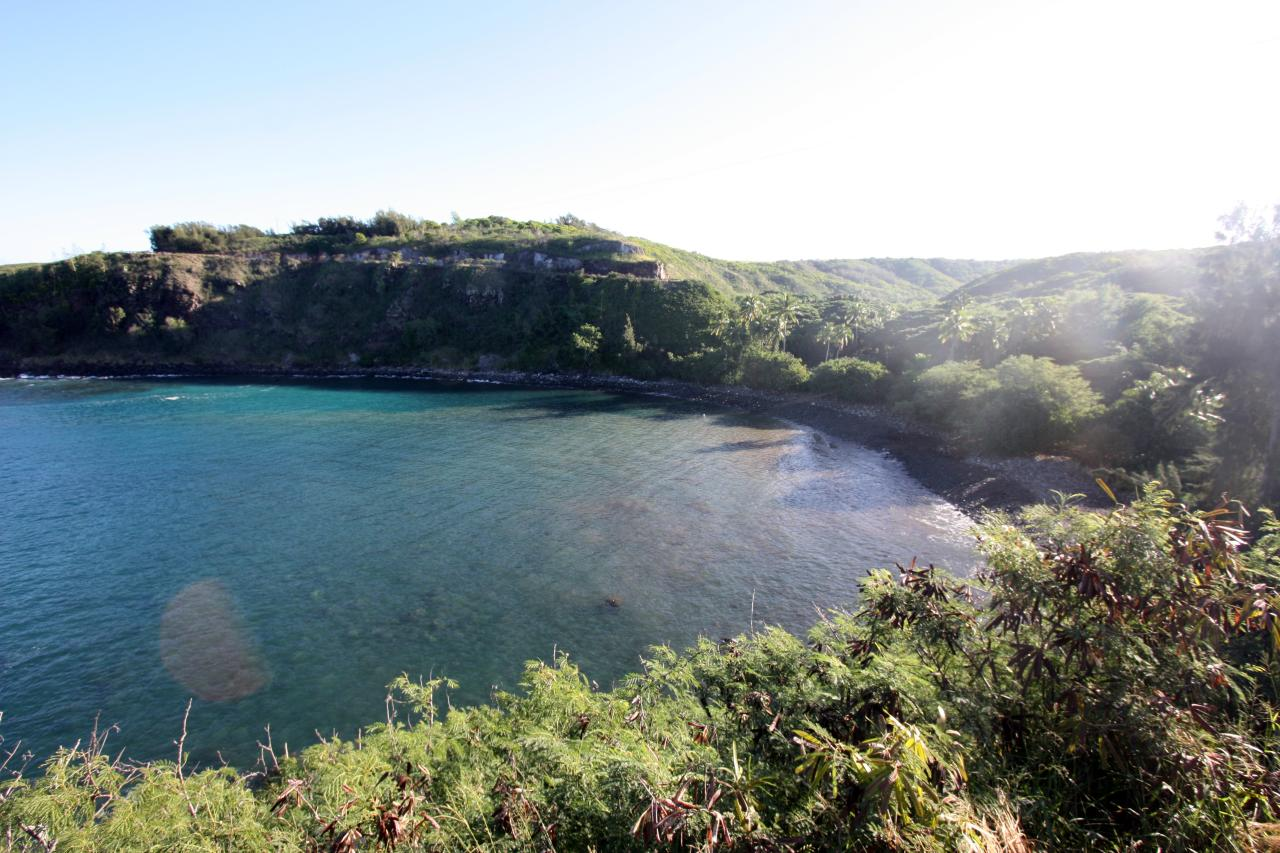
View of Honolua Bay from the turnout along highway 30; Honolua Bay Beach is part of the Mokuleia Marine Life Conservation District

There are both state and federal marine protected areas of the Hawaiian archipelago. The state protected areas, called Marine Life Conservation Districts, are managed by the State of Hawai'i Division of Aquatic Resources.

== Federally protected marine areas ==
- Hawaiian Islands Humpback Whale National Marine Sanctuary
- Papahānaumokuākea Marine National Monument

== State protected marine areas ==
- Hanauma Bay Marine Life Conservation District, Oahu
- Pūpūkeaahu Marine Life Conservation District, Oahu
- Waikīkī Marine Life Conservation District, Oahu
- Kealakekua Bay Marine Life Conservation District, Hawai'i
- Lapakahi Marine Life Conservation District, Hawai'i
- Old Kona Airport Marine Life Conservation District, Hawai'i
- Waialea Bay Marine Life Conservation District, Hawai'i
- Wai'ōpae Tidepools Marine Life Conservation District, Hawaii
- Honolua–Mokulē'ia Marine Life Conservation District, Maui
- Mānele–Hulopo'e Marine Life Conservation District, Maui
- Molokini Shoal Marine Life Conservation District, Maui

== See also ==
- Natural Area Reserves System Hawaii
- List of Hawaii state parks
- List of marine protected areas of California
- List of marine protected areas of Oregon
- List of marine protected areas of Washington
- List of U.S. National Marine Sanctuaries
