= Octopus Hole Conservation Area =

Designated conservation area on Washington's Hood Canal

Octopus Hole
- Location within Washington (state)
- Location: Washington, USA
- Waterbody: Hood Canal
- Nearest land: Lilliwaup, Washington
- Coordinates: 47°26.76′N 123°6.84′W
- Dive type: Open-water
- Depth range: 20 to 60 ft (6.1 to 18.3 m)
- Average visibility: 26 to 30 ft (7.9 to 9.1 m)
- Entry type: By boat
- Bottom composition: Rock
- Water: Salt
- Nearby sites: Privately own beach.

Octopus Hole Conservation Area is defined as those waters, tidelands, and bedlands of Hood Canal within a line projected due east from the western shore of Hood Canal on latitude 47°27'01"N for 200 yards, thence southerly 628 yards parallel to the high watermark to latitude 47°26'40", thence due west to shore.

Similar to the close-by Sund Rock conservation area, Octopus Hole is very popular with scuba divers who enjoy diving the walls associated with the site to view various underwater creatures, including lingcod, giant Pacific octopus, wolf eel, sea cucumber, and nudibranch.

The area is well known to regional scuba divers, especially for its two major walls, known colloquially as the north and south walls. These walls have depths of 70 to 80 feet (21 to 24 m), depending upon the tide. Several other walls exist, some going down beyond 100 feet (30 m) in depth. One of these is called "fish pen wall." Additional features include the "fishbowl"—a reef-like area full of life—a large sunken boat just to the north of the north wall and a small wrecked boat between the north and south walls. An alternative method is to access a private beach nearby.

Recreational and technical divers alike find Sund Rock attractive for various reasons. Recreational divers appreciate Sund Rock because it is not a current-sensitive area, the main walls are easily within recreational dive limits, and for abundant sea life. Technical divers enjoy the deeper walls and other areas that allow them to dive well beyond recreational limits.

Because Octopus Hole is a conservation area, no hunting or gathering of any kind is permitted.

Like most sites on the mid to southern Hood canal, this area is not currently sensitive. However, some noticeable current can occur. Such current is not strong enough to significantly affect dive plans or cause problems, but it is strong enough to slow or speed progress, depending upon the diver's direction.

== See also ==
- List of marine protected areas of Washington
