= List of marine protected areas of Oregon =

State and federally managed ocean reserves

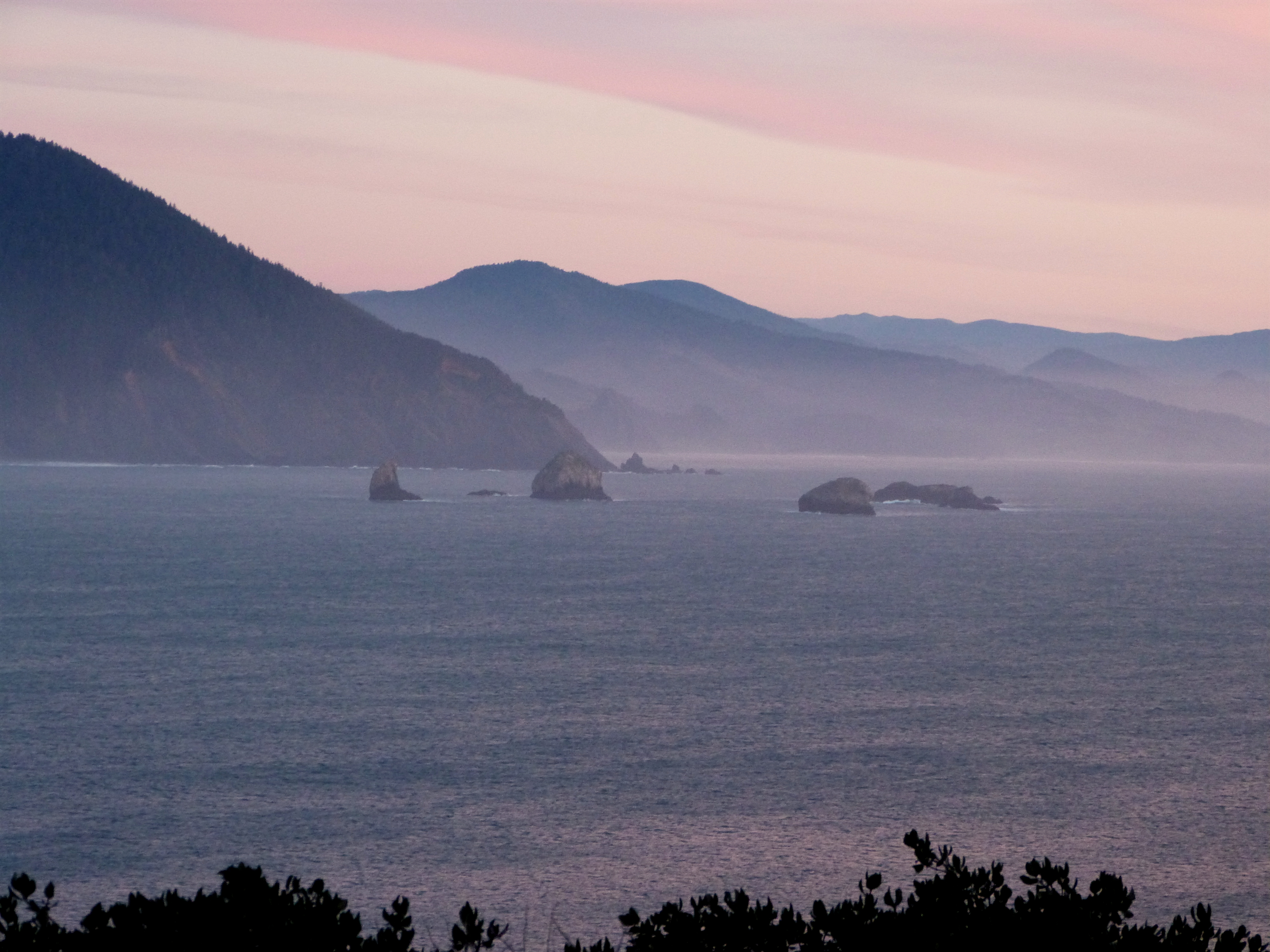
Redfish Rocks, as seen from Port Orford Heads State Park, Oregon, United States, at dusk. The rocks themselves are part of the Oregon Islands National Wildlife Refuge, and the waters surrounding the rocks form the Redfish Rocks State Marine Reserve.

This is a list of marine protected areas of the U.S. state of Oregon. The state marine reserves are managed by the Oregon Department of Fish and Wildlife.

- Cape Falcon Marine Reserve
- Cascade Head Marine Reserve
- Otter Rock Marine Reserve
- Cape Perpetua Marine Reserve
- Redfish Rocks Marine Reserve

== See also ==
- List of Oregon state parks
- List of marine protected areas of California
- List of marine protected areas of Hawaii
- List of marine protected areas of Washington
