= San Juan Islands National Wildlife Refuge =

Wildlife refuge in Washington, US

- IUCN category IV (habitat/species management area)
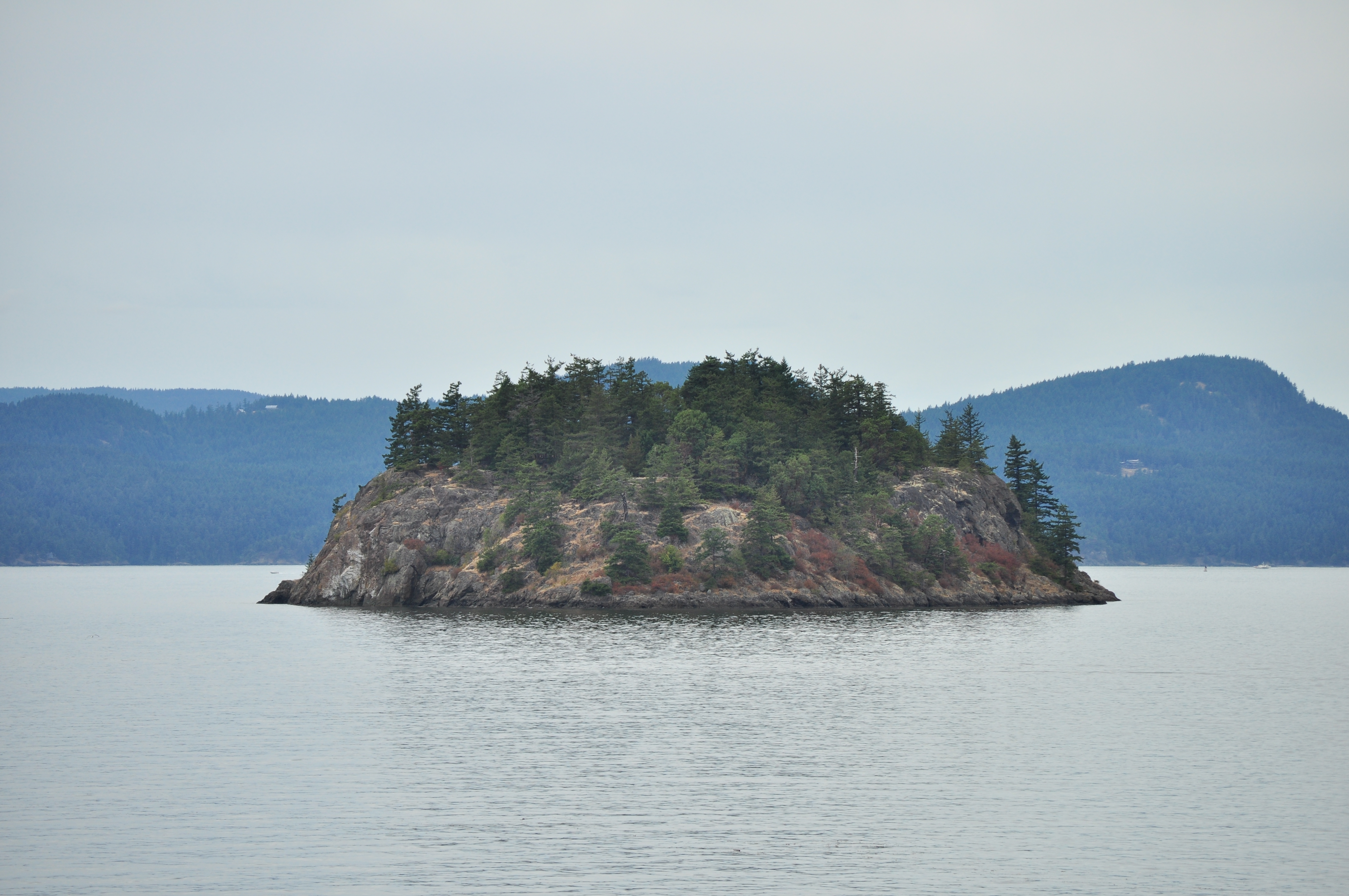
- Willow Island

- Location within Washington (state)
- Location: San Juan County, Washington, United States
- Nearest city: Friday Harbor, Washington
- Coordinates: 48°38′49″N 123°04′59″W
- Area: 454 acres (1.84 km^{2})
- Established: 1976
- Governing body: U.S. Fish and Wildlife Service
- Website: San Juan Islands National Wildlife Refuge

The San Juan Islands National Wildlife Refuge is in the San Juan Islands of the Salish Sea, north of Puget Sound, in Washington. Created in 1976, it comprises 83 small, uninhabited islands, scattered throughout the San Juans, with a combined area of approximately 454 acres (1.84 km^{2}). The refuge is managed by the U.S. Fish and Wildlife Service as one of six in the Washington Maritime National Wildlife Refuge Complex.

All but three of the islands are designated wilderness area in the San Juan Wilderness (353 acres (1.43 km^{2})), also established in 1976. Visitors are prohibited, and boaters must keep at least 200 yards from the shore to avoid disturbing the wildlife. Excluded are two state parks managed jointly with the Washington State Park System, five acres of Matia Island and Turn Island; Smith Island; and Minor Island.

The habitats of the various islands range from small rocks to larger grassy or forested islands, some with high cliffs that provide nesting sites for a large variety of marine birds.

== Wildlife ==
The refuge provides sanctuary for a large variety of animals including species of gull, cormorant, guillemot, puffin, brant, oystercatcher, killdeer, auklet, bald eagle, and harbor seal.

An estimated 200 species of birds visit the islands each year. Harbor seals and whales are common in surrounding water and black brant have historically used the kelp beds for winter feeding.

== Recreation ==
Recreation in the refuge is limited to wildlife watching from afar. Boaters are requested to stay 200 yards from wilderness when observing wildlife. Public entry to the designated land is not permitted, with the exception of Matia Island, which is accessed by a cove with a dock. Matia Island has a 5 acres (0.020 km^{2}) campground and a 1 mile (1.6 km) trail through the wilderness.
