= Sonora High School =

Sonora High School may refer to:

- Sonora High School (La Habra, California), La Habra, California
- Sonora High School (Texas), Sonora, Texas
- Sonora Union High School, Sonora, California
