= Turn Island =

Island in the Salish Sea in the U.S. state of Washington

Turn Island Marine State Park
- Location within Washington (state) Location within the United States
- Location: San Juan County, Washington, United States
- Nearest town: Friday Harbor, Washington
- Coordinates: 48°31′57″N 122°58′18″W
- Area: 35.15 acres (14.22 ha)
- Elevation: 59 ft (18 m)
- Established: 1959
- Administrator: Washington State Parks and Recreation Commission
- Website: Official website

Turn Island is a 34-acre (14 ha) island in the San Juan Islands in the Salish Sea in the U.S. state of Washington. The island sits in the San Juan Channel about 900 feet off the east coast of San Juan Island. It is preserved as Turn Island Marine State Park and is part of the San Juan Islands National Wildlife Refuge. The island has 12 campsites and is only accessible by water. A few meters off the west shore of Turn Island, astride Boat Channel lies an unnamed island.

== History ==
Charles Wilkes, during the Wilkes Expedition of 1838-1842, thought it was part of San Juan Island and named it Point Salisbury after one of his officers. In 1858, the British found that it was an island with dangerous rocks in the channel between it and San Juan Island. The name Turn Island and Turn Rocks were given to mark the proper sailing channel.
