= Sonora Reef =

Coordinates: 47°18′53″N 124°18′36″W

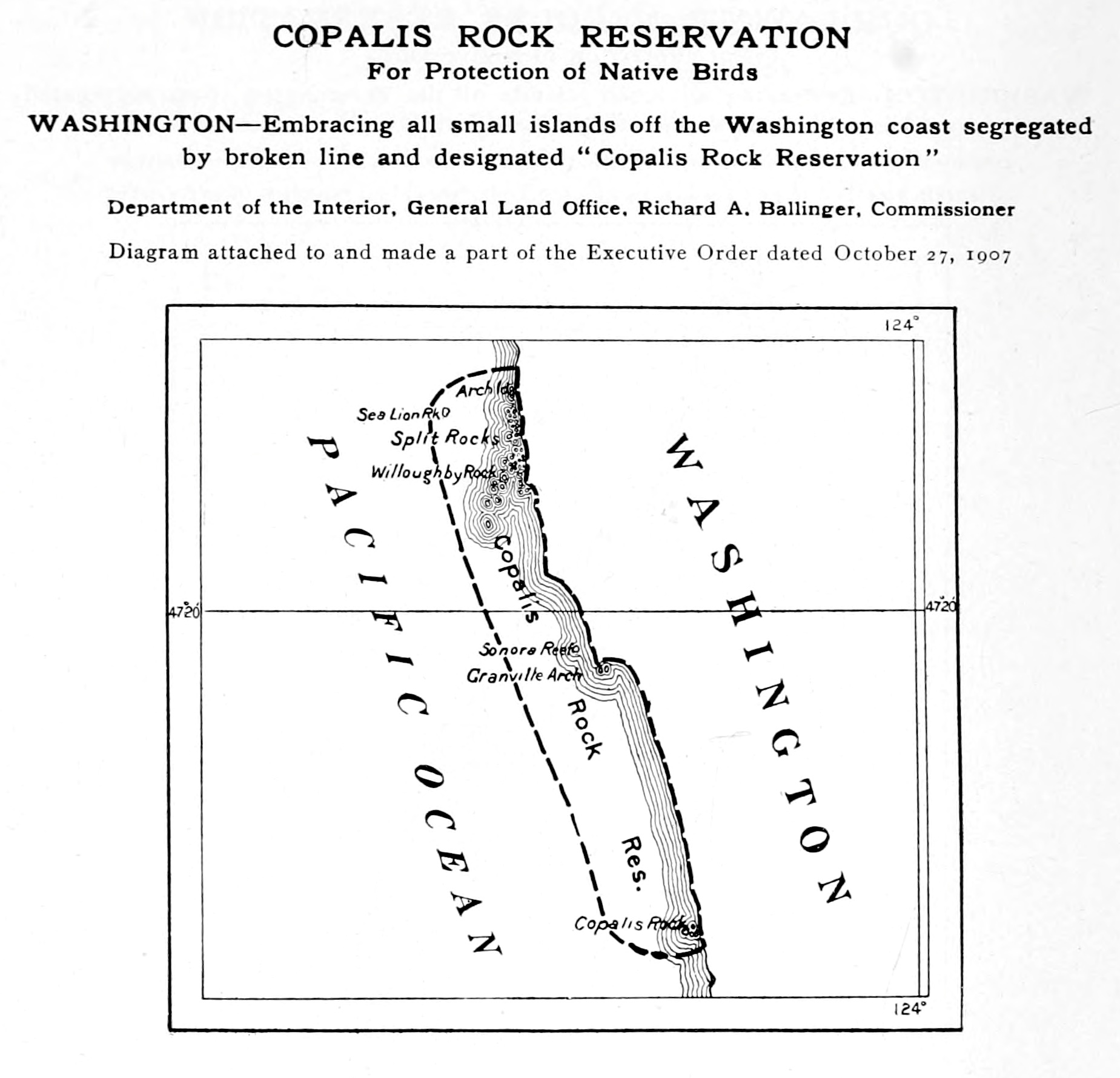
Map illustrating the location of Sonora Reef

Sonora Reef is a reef off the west coast of Grays Harbor County, Washington, United States. It is located in Taholah Bay near between Cape Elizabeth and Point Grenville, near the mouth of the Quinault River and the community of Taholah. Sonora reef was named for the Sonora, a Spanish schooner captained by Juan Francisco de la Bodega y Quadra in his and Bruno de Heceta's 1775 expedition from Mexico to the Pacific Northwest.
