= USS Sonoma =

USS Sonoma may refer to the following ships of the United States Navy:

- USS Sonoma (1862) was a side-wheel gunboat launched in 1862 and sold in 1867.
- USS Sonoma (AT-12) was a tug, launched in 1912 and sunk by enemy action in October 1944.
- USS Sonoma (ATA-175) was also a tug, commissioned in 1944 and decommissioned in 1946.
