= Matia Island =

Island of the San Juan islands in Washington, United States

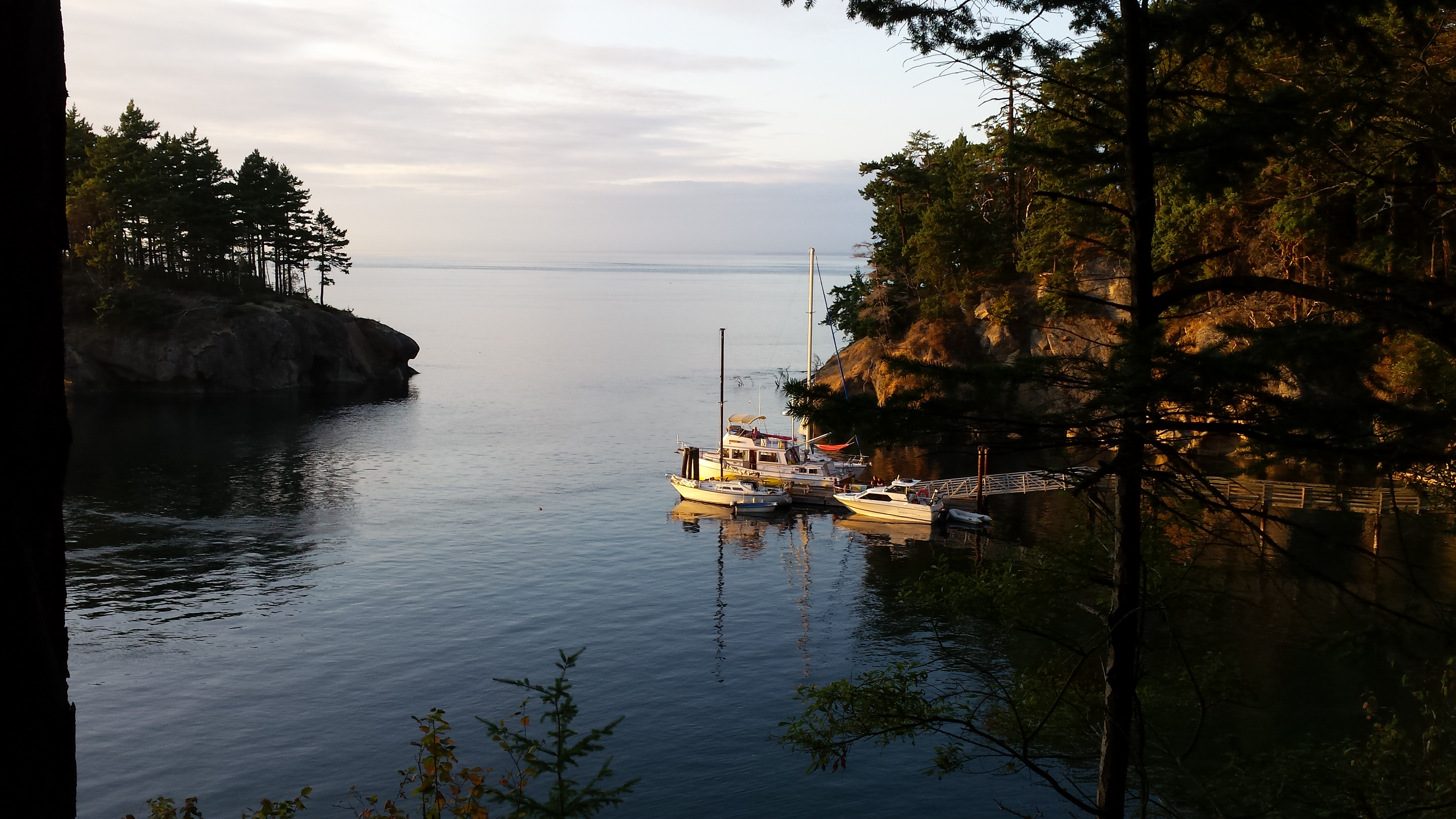
- Dock at Rolfe Cove, Matia Island

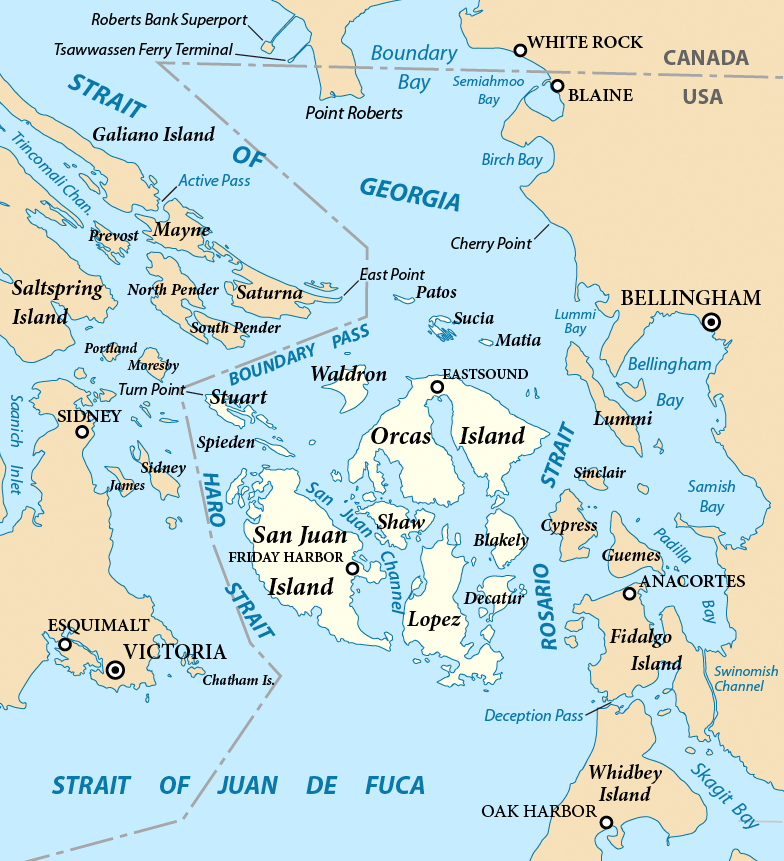
- Matia Island is to the north of Orcas Island
- Location: San Juan County, Washington, United States
- Coordinates: 48.746°N 122.837°W
- Area: 58.5 ha (145 acres)
- Established: 1937
- Administrator: Washington State Parks and Recreation Commission

Matia Island /ˈmeɪʃə/ (MAY-shə) is an island in the San Juan Islands of the U.S. state of Washington. The island's entire 145 acres (59 ha) comes under the protection of the U.S. Fish and Wildlife Service and is cooperatively managed by the Washington State Parks and Recreation Commission as Matia Island Marine State Park. Matia Island is a National Wildlife Refuge, part of the San Juan Islands National Wildlife Refuge. A 2-acre (0.81 ha) camping area around Rolfe Cove is managed as a State Marine Park by the Washington State Parks and Recreation Commission under an agreement dating back to 1959. Pets, wood collecting, and campfires (excluding liquid fuel campstoves) are not allowed on the island. Except for the Wilderness Loop Trail and the campground, all areas above the high tide line are closed to the public.

== History ==
Matia was named in 1792 by the Spanish explorer Francisco de Eliza as Isla de Mata, which can be translated into English as "island of no protection" or other meanings relating to lush plant growth.

Matia Island was established as "a refuge and breeding ground for migratory birds and other wildlife" in 1937 and became a National Wildlife Refuge in 1940. The U.S. Fish and Wildlife Service (formerly the U.S. Bureau of Sport Fisheries and Wildlife) and the Washington State Parks and Recreation Commission entered into a cooperative management agreement in June 1959 to use a small portion of the island (2 acres (0.81 ha) around Rolfe Cove) as a State Marine Park and campground in response to uncontrolled use by the public with the proliferation of private boats in the years following World War II.

In 1976, all but the 2-acre (0.81 ha) State Marine Park was designated as Wilderness under the Wilderness Act of 1964. Island visitors may access a 1.2-mile (1.9 km) loop trail through the wilderness portion of the island which is otherwise closed to the public to provide undisturbed habitat for wildlife. Visitors are required to stay on the trail and are not allowed to access other areas from the trail. The wilderness trail offers a unique glimpse of protected old growth island forest habitat present in only a few places in the region.

== The Hermit of Matia Island ==
For almost 30 years a man, Elvin H. Smith, lived in a cabin on a bay in the island's southeast corner (opposite Rolfe Cove). Smith was born in Wisconsin circa 1835. He fought in the American Civil War during the 1860s, rising from private to brevet captain in the Union Army. Embittered because Army bureaucrats never recognized his battlefield commission and disappointed by an unhappy love affair, he left home for good and headed west. After a stint as a newspaperman, he worked for years as a traveling passenger agent for the Northern Pacific Railroad until he gave up railroad business in 1890 and came to Bellingham, Washington.

Once in Bellingham, Smith joined forces with a lawyer to make some money on land speculation. There were rumors that the federal government was going to open Matia Island for homesteading. The lawyer fronted money to buy out a pair who had acquired squatters' rights on Matia. Smith moved to the island in April 1892 to perfect a claim the partners could sell at a profit. He was later dubbed "The Hermit of Matia Island", and remained there until his supply-laden rowboat vanished on in a storm on February 23, 1921 en route from nearby Orcas Island.

== Shoreline ==
Matia has 20,000 feet (6,100 m) of rocky cold saltwater shoreline on the Strait of Georgia. The tide varies by 14 feet (4 m).

== Access ==
Only 5 acres (2 ha) of the park with 680 feet (210 m) of waterfront are developed for public use. Boating facilities include a 116-foot (35 m) pier, one 45-foot (14 m) ramp, a 14-by-60-foot (4.3 m × 18.3 m) moorage float and two buoys. Facility use is first come, first served, with continuous moorage limited to three consecutive nights. Fees are charged year around.

== Facilities ==
Facilities include a 1.2 miles (2 km) loop trail, 6 primitive campsites, a picnic site and a composting toilet. There is no drinking water available and visitors must pack out their garbage. Pets, fires of any type, and wood collecting are not allowed on the island although there is an exception for liquid fuel campstoves.

== Activities ==
Matia offers primitive camping, picnicking, saltwater fishing, scuba diving, limited hiking and clam digging.

== Climate ==
Matia's temperatures are, like much of the Puget Sound area, heavily moderated by the abundance of water around it. Typically, the temperature rarely goes above 80 °F (26 °C) or below 30 °F (0 °C). Snow happens occasionally but is rarely of much account. Matia gets about 29 in (730 mm) of rain a year or about 80% of the rain Seattle gets. Late summer is the local dry season.
