= Olympic Coast National Marine Sanctuary =

Protected area in Washington state, US

- IUCN category IV (habitat/species management area)
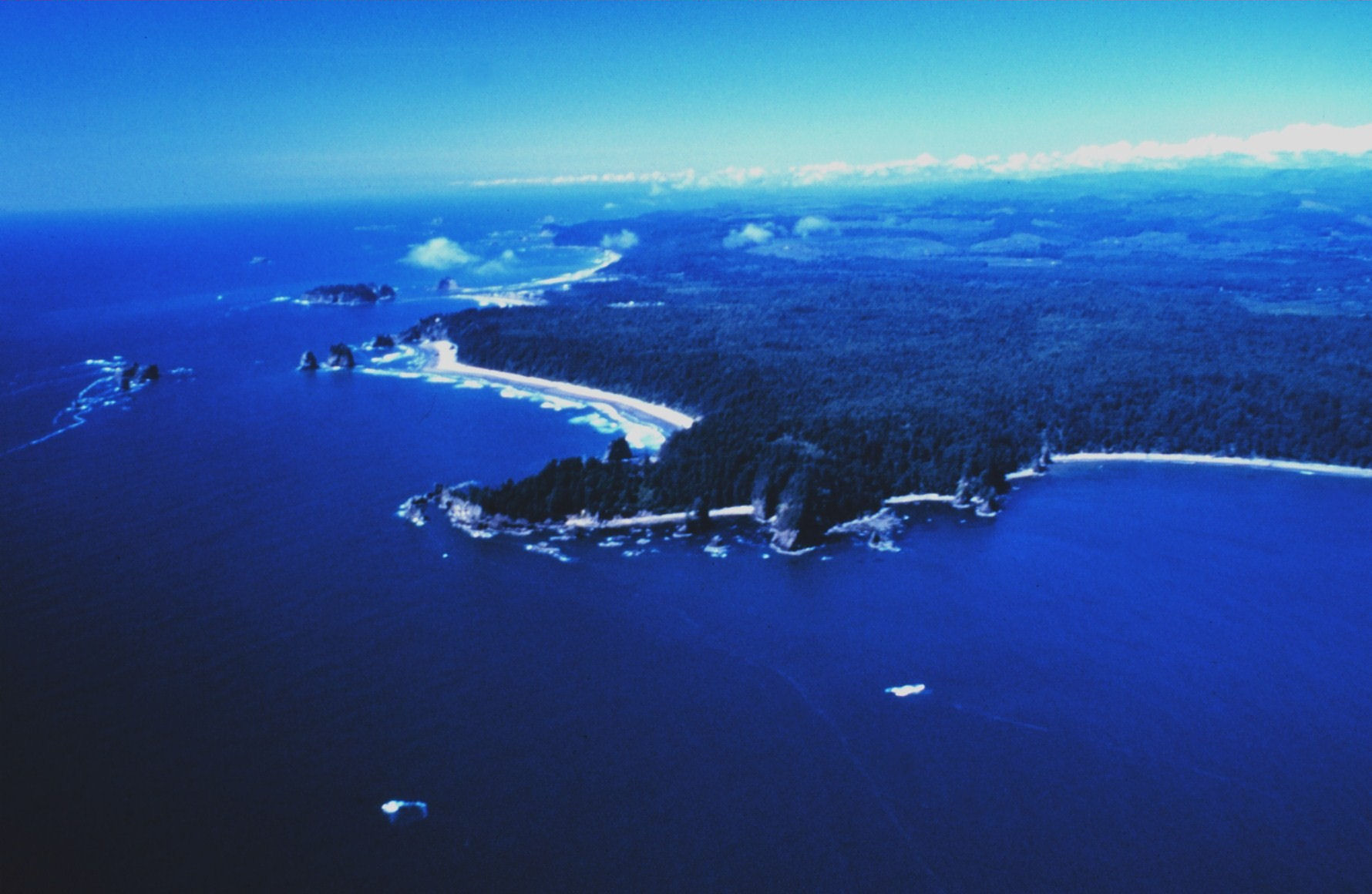
- Aerial view of Teahwhit Head and James Island
- Interactive map of Olympic Coast National Marine Sanctuary
- Location: Western Washington
- Coordinates: 48°00′N 124°48′W
- Area: 3,189 sq mi (8,260 km^{2})
- Established: May 11, 1994; 32 years ago
- Governing body: National Oceanic and Atmospheric Administration

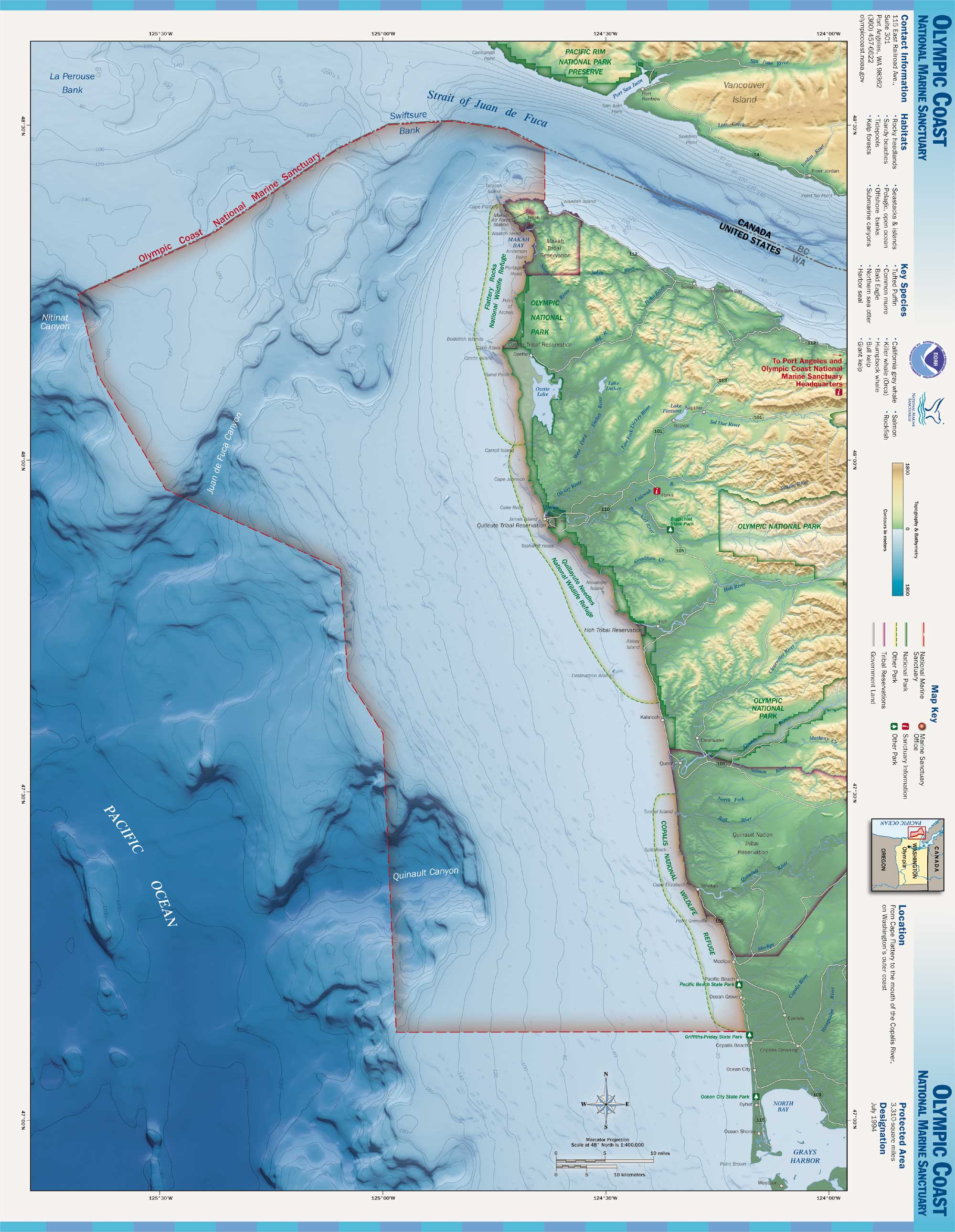
Map of the sanctuary

The Olympic Coast National Marine Sanctuary is one of 15 marine sanctuaries administered by the National Oceanic and Atmospheric Administration (NOAA), an agency of the U.S. Department of Commerce. Designated on May 11, 1994, the sanctuary encompasses 3,189 square miles (2,408 sq nmi; 8,259 km^{2}) of the Pacific Ocean along the Olympic Peninsula of Washington state, from Cape Flattery in the north to the mouth of the Copalis River, a distance of about 162.5 miles (261.5 km). Extending 25 to 40 miles (22 to 35 nmi; 40 to 64 km) from the shore, it includes most of the continental shelf, as well as parts of three important submarine canyons, the Nitinat Canyon, the Quinault Canyon, and the Juan de Fuca Canyon. For 64 miles (103 km) along the coast, the sanctuary shares stewardship with the Olympic National Park. Sanctuary stewardship is also shared with the Hoh, Quileute, and Makah Tribes, as well as the Quinault Indian Nation. The sanctuary overlays the Flattery Rocks, Quillayute Needles, and Copalis Rock National Wildlife Refuges.

== Gallery ==
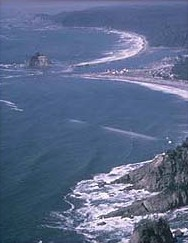
Olympic Coast National Marine Sanctuary

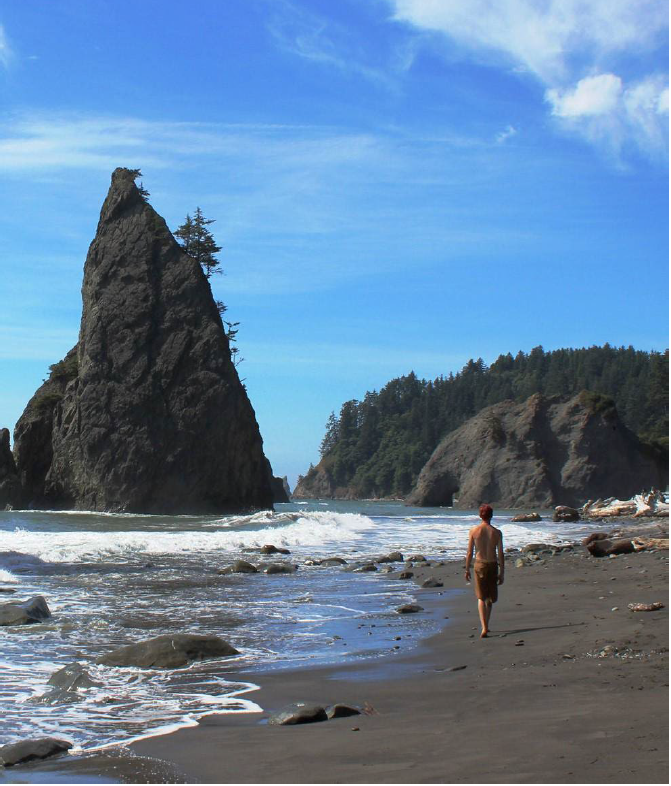
Rialto Beach

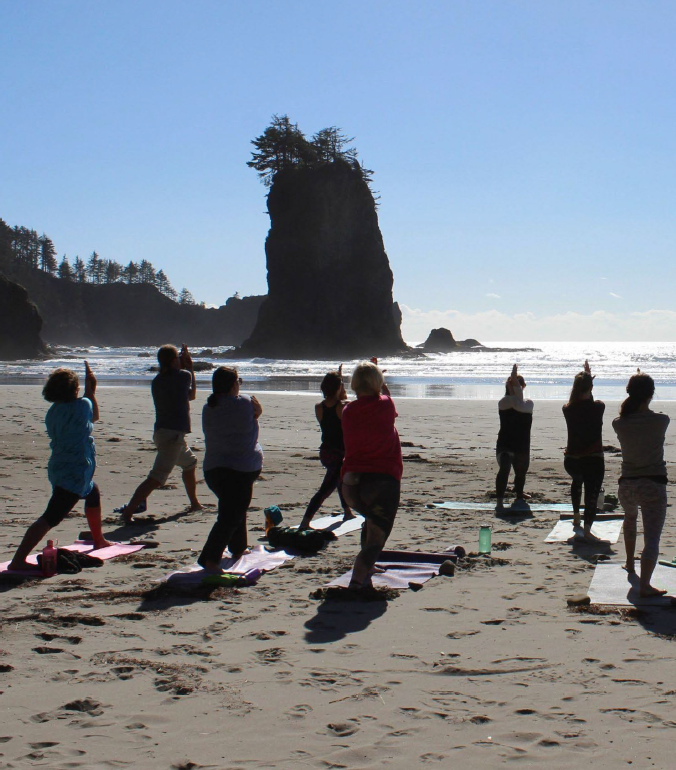
Yoga at the sanctuary

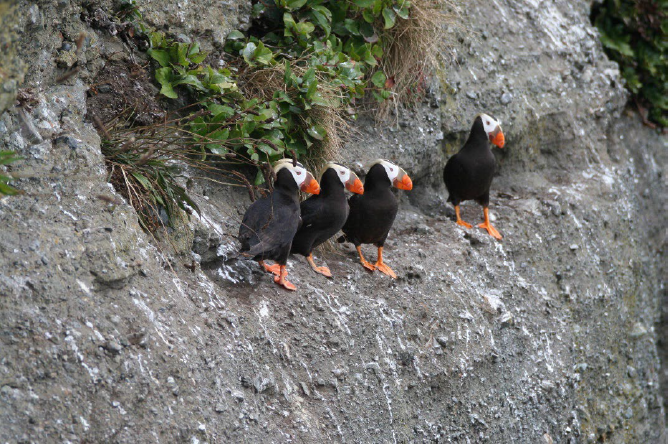
Tufted puffins

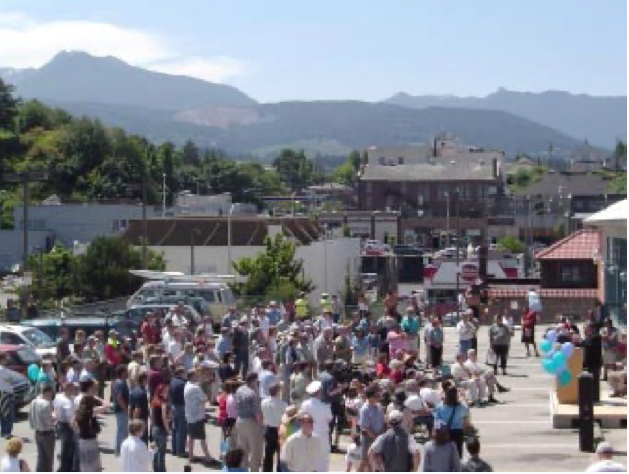
U.S. Representative Norm Dicks speaks at the dedication ceremony for the offices and visitor center in Port Angeles, Washington, in 2004.

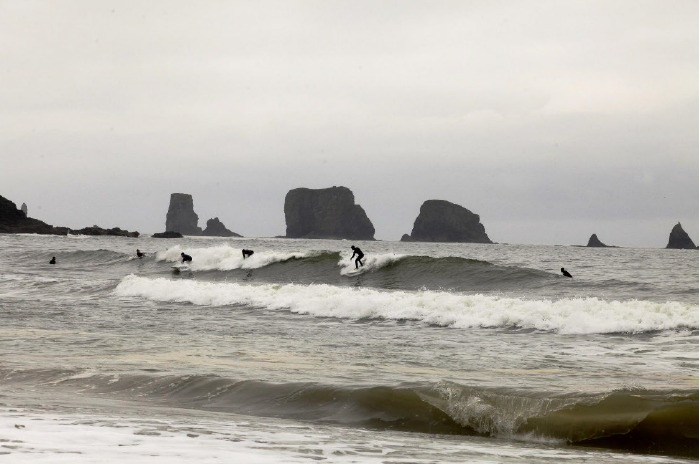
Surfers in 2015.

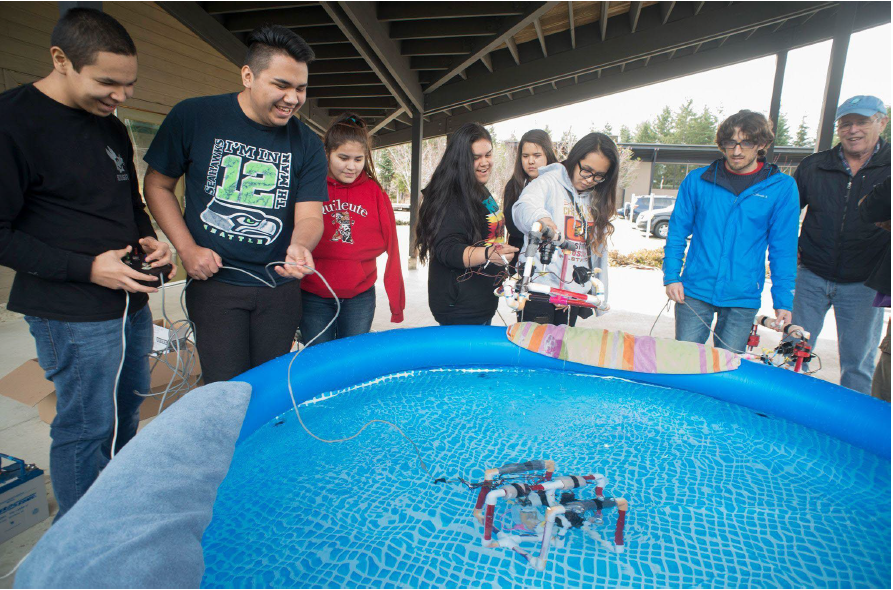
Students from Quileute Tribal School pilot a remotely operated underwater vehicle they built with help from the sanctuary and the University of Washington School of Oceanography in 2016.

== See also ==
- List of marine protected areas of Washington
