= Cape Falcon Marine Reserve =

Protected area in Oregon, United States

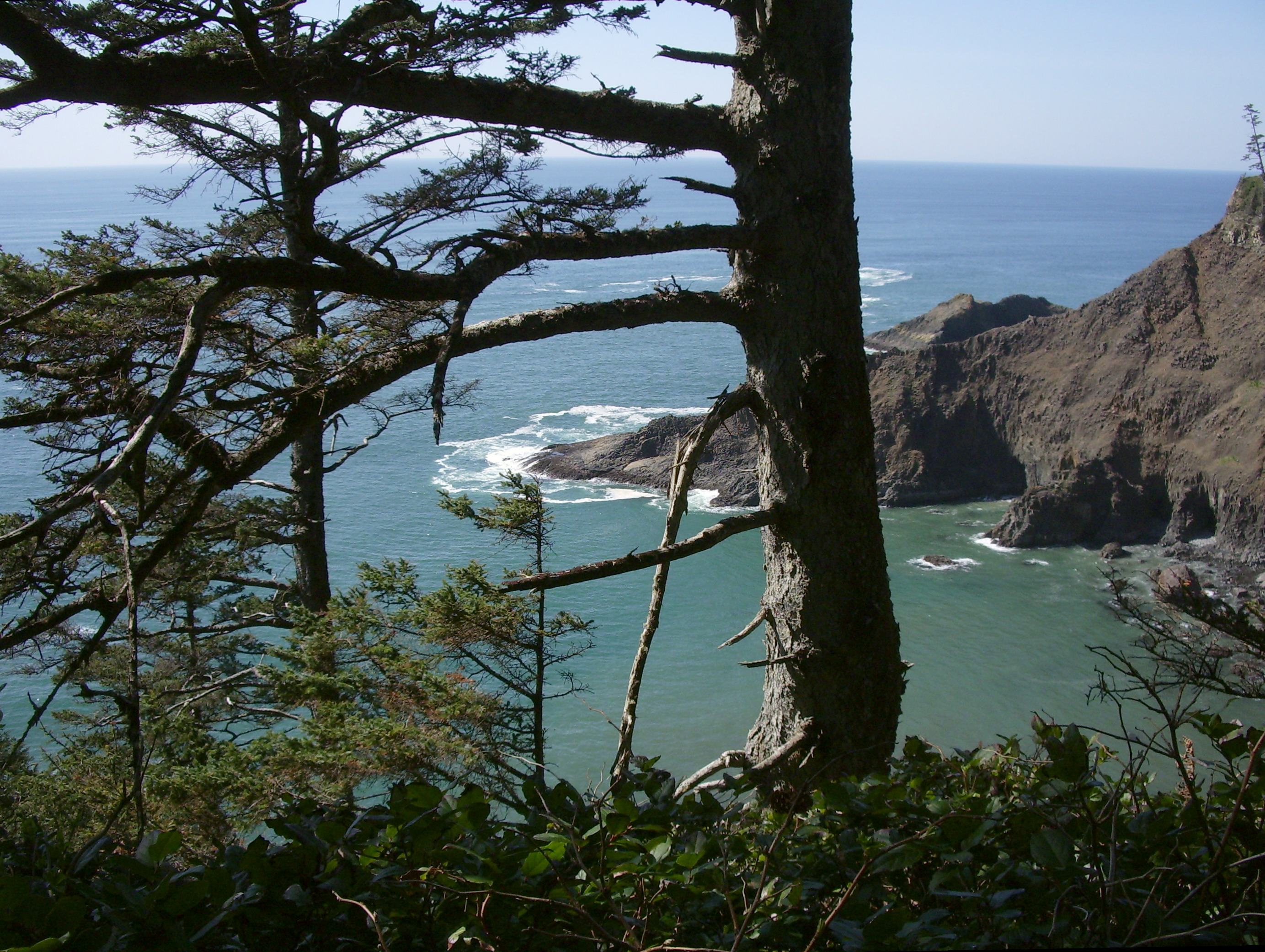
- Cape Falcon and the waters of the marine reserve

- Location within Oregon
- Interactive map of Cape Falcon Marine Reserve
- Type: Public, state
- Location: Tillamook County and Clatsop County, Oregon
- Nearest city: Manzanita and Cannon Beach
- Coordinates: 45°46′11″N 123°57′35″W
- Area: 55.2 square kilometers
- Operator: Oregon Department of Fish and Wildlife

Cape Falcon Marine Reserve in Oregon, United States, is a protected area located between Manzanita and the unincorporated community of Falcon Cove Beach in Tillamook and Clatsop Counties on the northern coast of Oregon. It is off the shore of Oswald West State Park. The marine reserve is part of Oregon's network of five marine reserves spread down the coastline. Its restrictions went into effect on January 1, 2016.

Cape Falcon Marine Reserve is the second largest in Oregon's system with 12.4 square miles of ocean habitats in the marine reserve and an additional 7.6 square miles in two types of marine protected areas (MPAs). In the marine reserve, no take of any marine resources is allowed. This includes no harvest of any species (i.e. no fishing, or gathering of kelp or mussels) and no ocean development. However, safe passage and anchoring of boats are allowed as long as fishing gear are not deployed. In the Cape Falcon Shoreside MPA (Falcon Cove sandy beach) only fishing from the beach is allowed. In the West MPA, only salmon fishing by troll, and crabbing, are allowed.

== See also ==
- List of marine protected areas of Oregon
