= Sonora, Missouri =

Extinct hamlet in northwest Missouri, U.S.

Coordinates: 40°29′53″N 95°39′34″W

Sonora is an extinct hamlet in Atchison County, in the U.S. state of Missouri. The GNIS classifies it as a populated place.

Sonora was laid out in 1846. A post office known as Rich existed from 1855 to 1872, then it was changed to Sonora and closed in 1875. The settlement was considered a small town.
