= Washington Maritime National Wildlife Refuge Complex =

Group of wildlife refuges in Washington State, USA

Washington Maritime National Wildlife Refuge Complex is an administrative grouping of six National Wildlife Refuges in Washington, managed by the United States Fish and Wildlife Service. It includes:

- Flattery Rocks National Wildlife Refuge (125 acres (51 ha), )
- Quillayute Needles National Wildlife Refuge (300.2 acres (121.5 ha), )
- Copalis National Wildlife Refuge (60.8 acres (24.6 ha), )
- Dungeness National Wildlife Refuge (772.52 acres (312.63 ha))
- Protection Island National Wildlife Refuge (659.31 acres (266.81 ha))
- San Juan Islands National Wildlife Refuge (454 acres (184 ha))

== Washington Islands Wilderness refuges ==
Flattery Rocks, Quillayute Needles, and Copalis are a group of 870 islands, rocks, and reefs extending for more than 100 miles along Washington's coast from Cape Flattery to Copalis Beach. These islands are protected from human disturbance, yet are close to abundant ocean food sources. They make up the Washington Islands Wilderness and are closed to the public, with wildlife observation only from boats and the mainland, and a 200-yard buffer zone surrounds each island. Only Tatoosh Island, James Island, and Destruction Island are not included in the wilderness area, which was established in 1970. The wilderness has a total land area of 1.8 square kilometres (0.69 sq mi) covering over 780 square kilometres (300 sq mi) of ocean.

More than a million seabirds, waterfowl, and shorebirds may live on the islands during migration season. Breeding colonies of 14 species of seabirds use these rocks to raise their young. Mammals that live near the islands include sea lions, harbor seals, sea otters, and whales.^{[3]}

These three lie within the boundary of Olympic Coast National Marine Sanctuary (National Oceanic and Atmospheric Administration). Along with nearby Olympic National Park the three agencies cooperate on research programs and other issues that may have impacts on the resources.

The refuges were originally created as Flattery Rocks Reservation, Quillayute Needles Reservation, and Copalis Rock Reservation on October 23, 1907, by executive orders from Theodore Roosevelt. They were renamed by a presidential proclamation on July 25, 1940. Flattery Rocks encompasses the islands off the Washington coast between latitudes 48° 02′ North and 48° 23′ North, Quillayute Needles those between latitudes 47° 38′ North, and 48° 02′ North, and Copalis those between latitudes 47° 08′ North, and 47° 29′ North. James Island was removed from Quillayute Needles in 1966 and returned to the Quileute when the island was discovered to be part of the Quileute Indian Reservation.

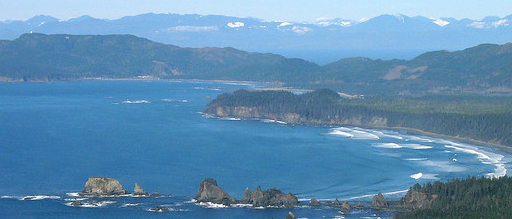
Point of Arches, Flattery Rocks

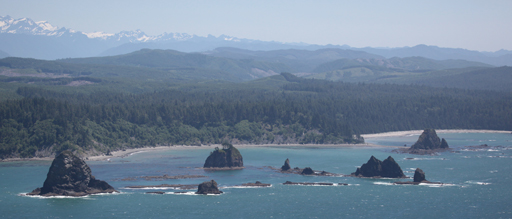
Quillayute Needles

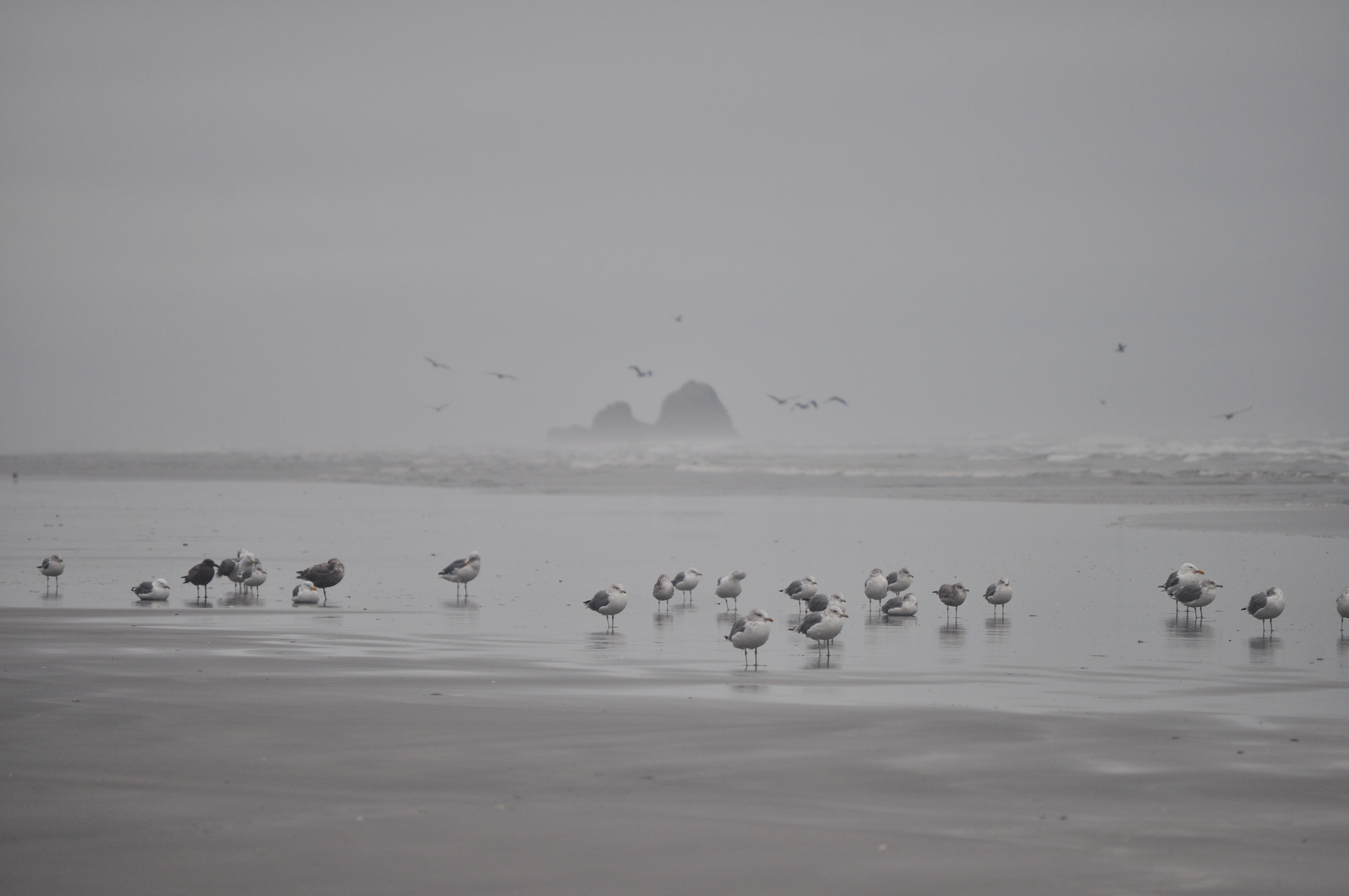
Copalis Rock from Roosevelt Beach
Flattery Rocks map

Quillayute Needles map

Copalis map

== Climate ==
Climate data for Washington Maritime National Wildlife Refuge Complex
Month	Jan	Feb	Mar	Apr	May	Jun	Jul	Aug	Sep	Oct	Nov	Dec	Year
Mean daily maximum °F (°C)	47 (8)	47 (8)	49 (9)	51 (11)	55 (13)	58 (14)	60 (16)	61 (16)	60 (16)	55 (13)	51 (11)	47 (8)	53 (12)
Mean daily minimum °F (°C)	40 (4)	39 (4)	41 (5)	43 (6)	47 (8)	50 (10)	53 (12)	53 (12)	51 (11)	47 (8)	43 (6)	40 (4)	46 (8)
Average precipitation inches (mm)	15.1 (380)	9.5 (240)	10.6 (270)	7.3 (190)	3.6 (91)	2.8 (71)	1.7 (43)	2.3 (58)	3.6 (91)	10.1 (260)	14.5 (370)	13.6 (350)	94.7 (2,414)
Source: U.S.Prism

== See also ==
- List of marine protected areas of Washington
