= List of lighthouses in Washington =

This is a list of all lighthouses in the U.S. state of Washington as identified by the United States Coast Guard. There are eighteen active lights in the state; three are standing but inactive, three were supplanted by automated towers, and two have been completely demolished. Two lights, one of them still active, serve as museums.

The Cape Disappointment Light was the first lighthouse in the state (lit 1856) and is still active.

If not otherwise noted, focal height and coordinates are taken from the United States Coast Guard Light List, while location and dates of activation, automation, and deactivation are taken from the United States Coast Guard Historical information site for lighthouses.

Name	Image	Location	Coordinates	Year first lit	Automated	Year deactivated	Current Lens	Focal Height
Admiralty Head Light		Coupeville	48.1608°N 122.6810°W	1861 (Former); 1903 (Current)	Never	1922 (Now a museum)	None	120 ft (37 m)
Alki Point Light		West Seattle	47.5763°N 122.4206°W	1913	1984	Active	VRB-25	39 ft (12 m)
Browns Point Light		Browns Point	47.3059°N 122.4443°W	1887 (First); 1933 (Current)	1963	Active	VRB-25	38 ft (12 m)
Burrows Island Light		Anacortes (Burrows Island)	48.4779°N 122.7135°W	1906	1972	Active	Optic	57 ft (17 m)
Bush Point Light		Coupeville	48.03087°N 122.60697°W	1894 (Former); 1933 (Current)	1933	Active	Unknown	Unknown
Cape Disappointment Light		Cape Disappointment	46.2758°N 124.0522°W	1856	1973	Active	Fourth-order Fresnel	220 ft (67 m)
Cape Flattery Light		Tatoosh Island	48.3919°N 124.7370°W	1857	1977	2009 (Replaced with skeleton tower)	None	165 ft (50 m)
Cattle Point Light		San Juan Island	48.4506°N 122.9633°W	1888 (Former); 1935 (Current)	1950s	Active	Unknown	Unknown
Clover Island Light		Kennewick	46.217°N 119.111°W	2010	Always	Active	LED	62 ft (19 m)
Destruction Island Light		Destruction Island	47.6745°N 124.4869°W	1892	1968	2008	None	165 ft (50 m)
Dofflemyer Point Light		Boston Harbor	47.1405°N 122.9073°W	1887 (Former); 1934 (Current)	1987	Active	Unknown	30 ft (9.1 m)
Ediz Hook Light		Port Angeles (Air Station)	48.1401°N 123.4023°W	1865 (First); 1908 (Last)	Never	1946 (Replaced with skeleton tower)	None	Unknown
Grays Harbor Light		Westport	46.8882°N 124.1169°W	1898	1945	Active	Third-order Fresnel	123 ft (37 m)
Lime Kiln Light		San Juan Island	48.5160°N 123.1524°W	1919	1962	Active	375mm	55 ft (17 m)
Marrowstone Point Light		Marrowstone (Fort Flagler State Park)	48.1016°N 122.6879°W	1888 (Former); 1918 (Current)	1962	Active	Unknown	28 ft (8.5 m)
Mukilteo Light		Mukilteo	47.9487°N 122.3062°W	1906	1979	Active (Also a museum)	Fourth-order Fresnel	33 ft (10 m)
New Dungeness Light		Sequim (Dungeness Spit)	48.1817°N 123.1103°W	1857	1994	Active	VRB-25 acrylic lens	67 ft (20 m)
North Head Light		Ilwaco	46.2989°N 124.0780°W	1898	1961	Active	VRB-25	194 ft (59 m)
Patos Island Light		Patos Island	48.7890°N 122.9713°W	1893 (Former); 1908 (Current)	1974	Active	Unknown	52 ft (16 m)
Point No Point Light		Hansville (Point No Point)	47.9122°N 122.5268°W	1880	1977	Active	Plastic	27 ft (8.2 m)
Point Roberts Light		Point Roberts	48.9715°N 123.0827°W	Unknown	Unknown	Active?	Unknown	Unknown
Point Robinson Light		Vashon (Point Robinson)	47.3881°N 122.3744°W	1887 (Former); 1915 (Current)	1978	Active	Plastic	40 ft (12 m)
Point Wilson Light		Port Townsend	48.1442°N 122.7548°W	1879 (Former); 1914 (Current)	1976	Active	Fourth-order Fresnel	51 ft (16 m)
Semiahmoo Harbor Light		Blaine	48.9923°N 122.7840°W	1905	Never	1944 (Demolished)	None	Unknown
Skunk Bay Light		Port Ludlow	Latitude: 47.91925, Longitude: -122.56981	1965 (Faux)	Always	Active	Unknown	Unknown
Slip Point Light		Clallam Bay	48.2645°N 124.251°W	1905 (First); 1951 (Last)	1977	2000 (Removed)	None	55 ft (17 m)
Smith Island Light		Smith Island	48.3184°N 122.8438°W	1858	1957	1998 (Destroyed)	None	97 ft (30 m)
Turn Point Light		Stuart Island	48.6888°N 123.2374°W	1893 (Former); 1936 (Current)	1974	Active	300mm	44 ft (13 m)
West Point Light		Seattle (West Point)	47.6620°N 122.4357°W	1881	1985	Active	VRB-25	27 ft (8.2 m)
Willapa Bay Light		Willapa Bay	46.71°N 124.08°W (Estimate)	1858	Never	1938 (Demolished)	None	81 ft (25 m)
