= North Head =

North Head may mean or refer to:

- North Head, New South Wales is a headland at the entrance to Sydney Harbour
- North Head, a promontory in the state of Washington, USA, north of the mouth of the Columbia River, the site of North Head Light
- North Head, New Zealand, a volcanic cone headland in North Shore City, New Zealand, at the east end of the Waitemata Harbour
- North Head, Wick Bay, one of the headlands at the entrance to Wick Bay, Highland, Scotland
- MV North Head (formerly SS Barrenjoey), a ferry operated by the Port Jackson & Manly Steamship Company and its successors on the Manly service from 1913 until 1985
