= Fort Canby =

Fort Canby may refer to:

- Fort Canby (Washington), a coastal fort preserved as part of Cape Disappointment State Park in the U.S. state of Washington
  - Fort Canby State Park, the former name for Cape Disappointment State Park
- Fort Canby (Arizona), a fort reestablished at the site of Fort Defiance in Arizona
