= Warrior Rock =

Warrior Rock may refer to:

- Warrior Rock: Toyah on Tour, an album by Toyah
- Warrior Rock Light, a lighthouse on the Columbia River near Portland, Oregon
