= Cape Disappointment Light =

Lighthouse in Washington, United States

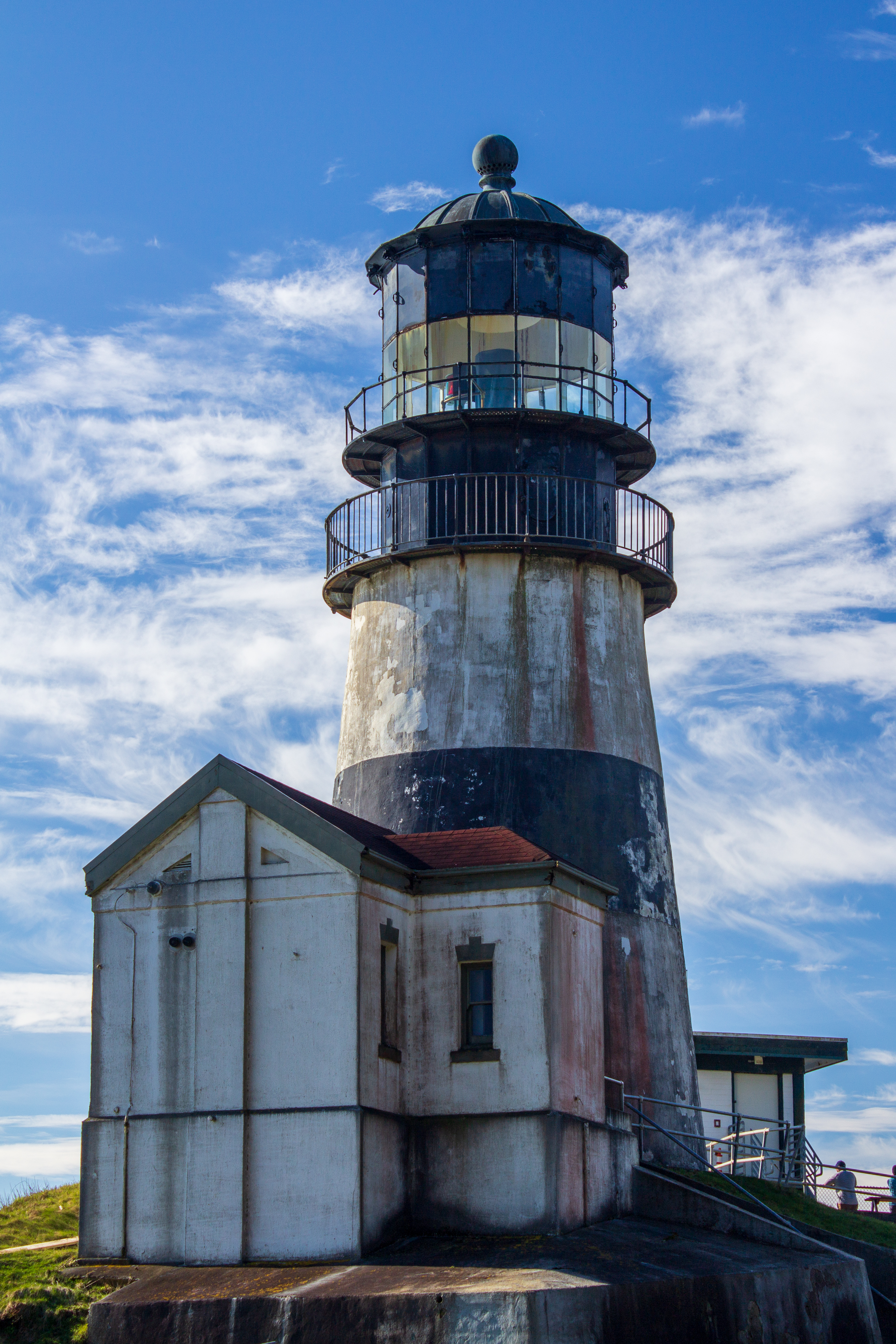
- Location: Ilwaco, Washington
- Coordinates: 46.2756°N 124.0518°W

Tower
- Constructed: 1856
- Foundation: Surface
- Construction: Brick
- Automated: 1973
- Height: 53 feet (16 m)
- Shape: Conical

Light
- First lit: 1856
- Focal height: 67 m (220 ft)
- Lens: Fourth Order Fresnel lens
- Characteristic: Alt WR 30s

The Cape Disappointment Light is a lighthouse on Cape Disappointment near the mouth of the Columbia River in the U.S. state of Washington.

== History ==
In 1848, it was recommended a lighthouse be located at Cape Disappointment in what was then the Oregon Territory. An appropriation of $53,000 was made in 1852. After the lighthouse was designed, a first-order Fresnel lens was ordered. When the lens arrived it was found to be too large for the tower. Rebuilding the tower took an additional two years. The first lighthouse in the Pacific Northwest was finally lit on October 15, 1856. In addition to the light, the station was equipped with a 1,600-pound (730 kg) bell powered by a striking mechanism. The keeper's residence was about a quarter-mile away.

The lighthouse had several shortcomings. The fog bell was sometimes inaudible due to the roar of ocean waves. It was discontinued in 1881 and moved to West Point Light in Seattle, and eventually to Warrior Rock Light near Portland. Also, the light was not visible to ships approaching from the north. This problem was corrected by building a lighthouse at North Head, two miles from Cape Disappointment. The first-order lens was moved to North Head and a fourth-order lens installed at Cape Disappointment.

The lighthouse was electrified in 1937. In 1956, the Coast Guard intended to close the station, but retained the light when the Columbia River Bar Pilots protested. The light was automated in 1973. An observation deck has been built for the Coast Guard to monitor traffic and bar conditions. The grounds are open to the public through Cape Disappointment State Park.

== See also ==
- List of Washington lighthouses
- List of Oregon lighthouses
