= North Cove, Washington =

Unincorporated community in Washington, United States

- Unincorporated community
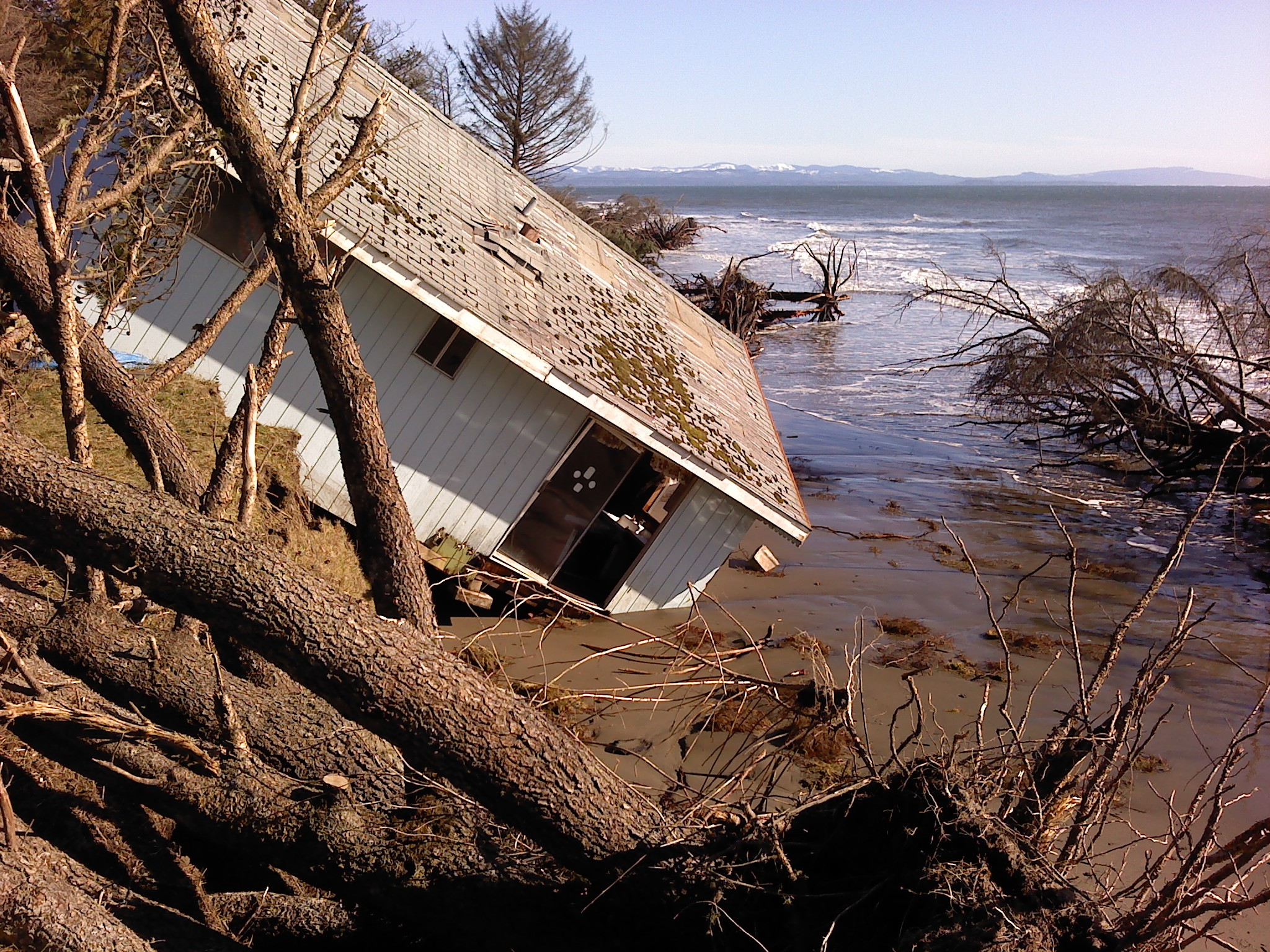
- Effects of coastal erosion in North Cove

- Location within the state of Washington North Cove, Washington (the United States)
- Coordinates: 46°44′17″N 124°04′45″W
- Country: United States
- State: Washington
- County: Pacific
- Elevation: 30 ft (9.1 m)
- Time zone: UTC-8 (Pacific (PST))
  - Summer (DST): UTC-7 (PDT)
- Area code: 360
- GNIS feature ID: 1511536

North Cove is an unincorporated community in Pacific County, Washington, United States. North Cove is mostly residential, with some vacation rentals and a general store being the only commercial properties. The community suffers from the extreme coastal erosion of Cape Shoalwater, which has been diminished drastically in size, with the ocean claiming dozens of structures over the last 100 years and remaining a substantial threat.

== Establishment ==
The United States established a military reservation on Cape Shoalwater in 1854 after negotiating with Chief Ma-Tote of the Shoalwater Bay Tribe for the land. In 1858, the Willapa Bay Light was built on the site, becoming one of the earliest light houses in the state.

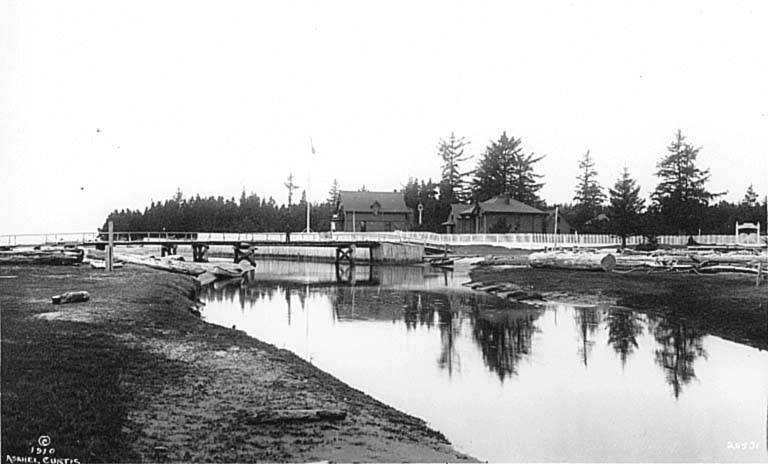
US Coast Guard North Cove lifesaving station, Willapa Bay, Pacific County

Even with the lighthouse in operation, ships continued to have difficulty navigating the waters around Cape Shoalwater, and the government decided to build the Shoalwater Bay Lifesaving Station in 1878. Captain George Johnson was assigned to keep the station, and he left his land claim near current day Raymond, Washington to purchase 32 acres (13 ha) near Cape Shoalwater. The town of North Cove was platted on this property in February 1884 by his wife, Lucy Johnson.

The town was in a beneficial position, as it was a convenient rest stop for ships making the voyage between Portland, Oregon and Seattle, Washington. Mrs. Johnson began opening her home to travelers, and soon opened it officially as the Hotel Norwood. At the time, the town also had a general store, a post office, a Knights of the Maccabees events hall, and over a dozen homes. A cannery also opened in 1909, providing employment for many residents.

== Coastal erosion ==
By 1920, the Coast Guard decided to begin moving equipment from the military reservation to Tokeland, Washington due to erosion at North Cove (The United States Life-Saving Service merged with the United States Revenue Cutter Service to form the United States Coast Guard in 1915).

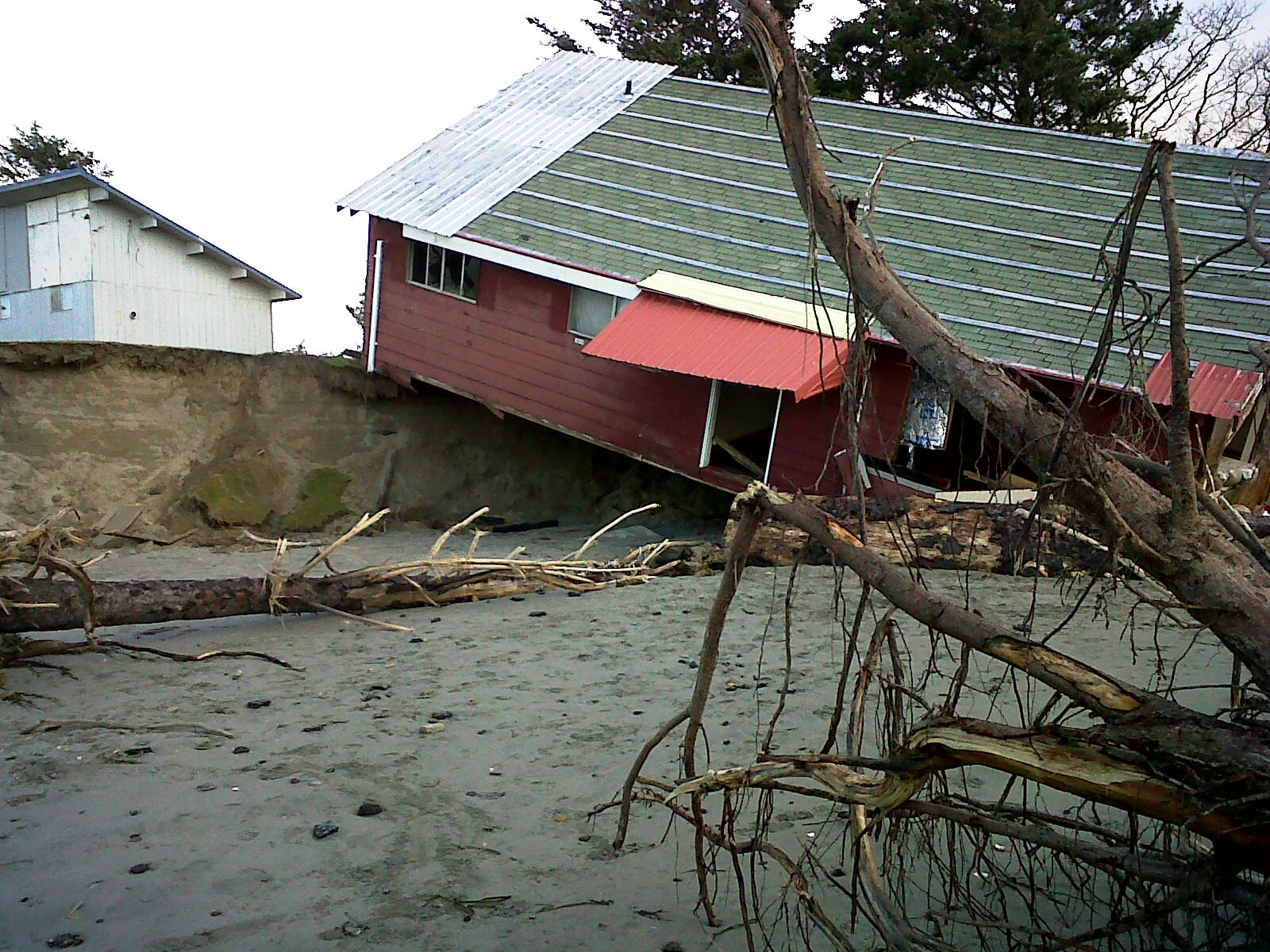
Washaway Beach home losing the battle

The Willapa Bay Light was lost to erosion in 1940. By 1950, the entire station was in jeopardy of falling into the ocean, and the facility was relocated to Tokeland, with buildings being salvaged when possible but otherwise left to the ocean.

By 2016, 60 residential properties and 537 land parcels totaling over 2,018 acres (817 ha) had eroded into the ocean. North Cove has been nicknamed "Washaway Beach," and its loss of over 100 feet (30 m) of land per year has led to it being labeled the fastest-eroding shoreline on the West Coast.

The nearby communities of the Shoalwater Bay Indian Reservation and Tokeland have also been affected by the rapid erosion of the north shore of the bay.

The community continues struggling to slow the rapid coastal erosion through ongoing efforts to maintain shorelines, including portions of Washington State Route 105. Efforts to stabilize the shoreline using dynamic revetment, which employs natural materials such as driftwood and cobble to dissipate wave energy, are showing promise. In 2016, a life-long resident started dumping basalt cobble which creates a foundation for the driftwood and the dune vegetation.

== Geography ==
North Cove lies at the end of Cape Shoalwater, at the mouth of Willapa Bay. It is south of Grayland Beach State Park along State Route 105.
