= Dynamic revetment =

Cobble-based coastal protection

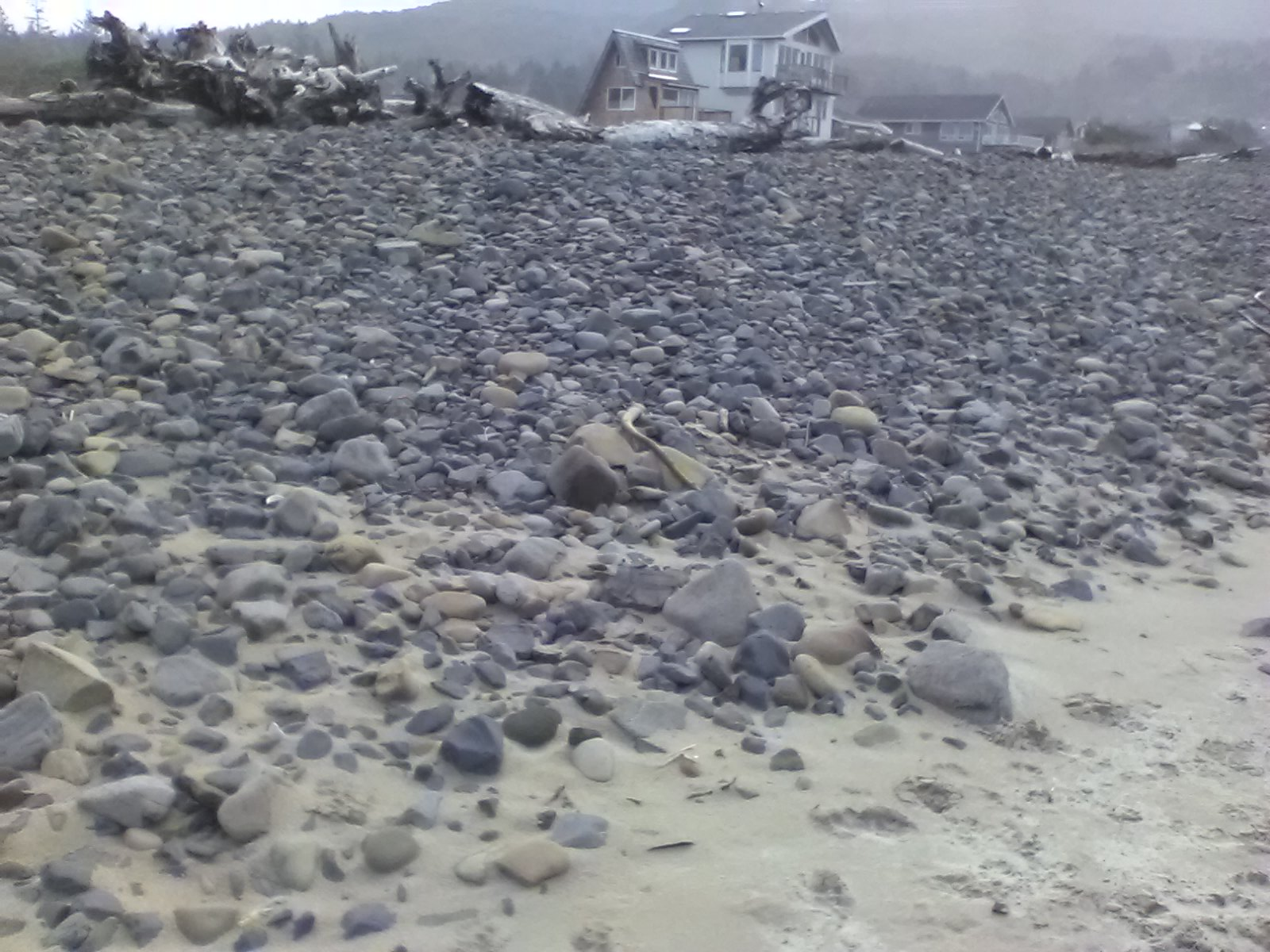
Bayocean, Oregon, January 2020

Dynamic revetments, also known as "cobble berms" or "dynamic cobble berm revetments", use gravel or cobble-sized rocks to mimic a natural cobble storm beach for the purpose of reducing wave energy and stopping or slowing coastal erosion. Unlike seawalls, dynamic revetment is designed to allow wave action to rearrange the stones into an equilibrium profile, disrupting wave action and dissipating wave energy as the cobbles move. This can reduce the wave reflection which often contributes to beach scouring.

== Principle ==
The goal is to create structures that are natural in appearance and function while providing acceptable protection to coastlines, combining the benefits of ecologically responsive shore protection methods with those of conventional armor‑stone revetments or seawalls.

A line of logs can also be employed as upper reinforcement for a cobble berm. Drift logs are common on most shores in the Pacific Northwest. Their crisscrossed arrangement provides dynamic stability even when impacted by high tides and waves, capturing wind-blown sand and encouraging the growth of foredunes.

== History ==
Self-protection via landslides was demonstrated in the early 1990s when, in an effort to stabilize the Lone Tree landslide 15 km north of San Francisco, California Department of Transportation dumped excavated material including rocks and sediment sized from clay to large boulders down a steep cliff face, creating an artificial landslide. This experiment permitted the documentation of the early stages of landslide erosion, including the processes of waves cutting away the toe of the slide. It was observed that a beach immediately began to form along the toe of the eroding slide, consisting of the coarsest materials, gravel, cobbles and boulders. With its accumulation, the rate of toe erosion progressively slowed, the material having sorted itself into a protective gravel and cobble beach, backed in riprap-like fashion by a line of armor-sized boulders.

=== Laboratory experiment ===
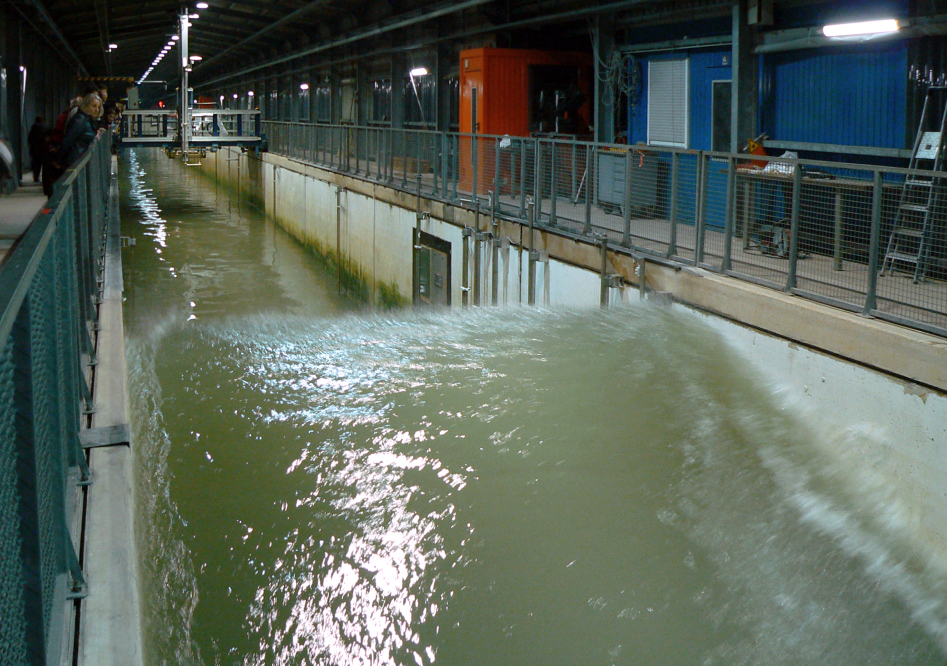
Large Wave Flume [Großer Wellenkanal], Hanover Germany

In 2017 DynaRev, a research project funded by the European Union, conducted a large scale laboratory experiment at the Large Wave Flume (Großer Wellenkanal) in Hanover, Germany. Its aim was to determine the performance and resilience of dynamic revetments to rising sea-level. The response of a sand beach was measured for various water levels and wave heights, both with and without an upper cobble berm. During the experiment, the dynamic revetment demonstrated dynamic stability, as the individual cobbles within the structure moved with every wave but the global shape of the revetment remained stable. The researchers determined that dynamic revetments appeared to be a sustainable and affordable option for many locations experiencing coastal erosion where complete protection from coastal hazards is not needed and some coastal retreat is acceptable.

== Projects ==
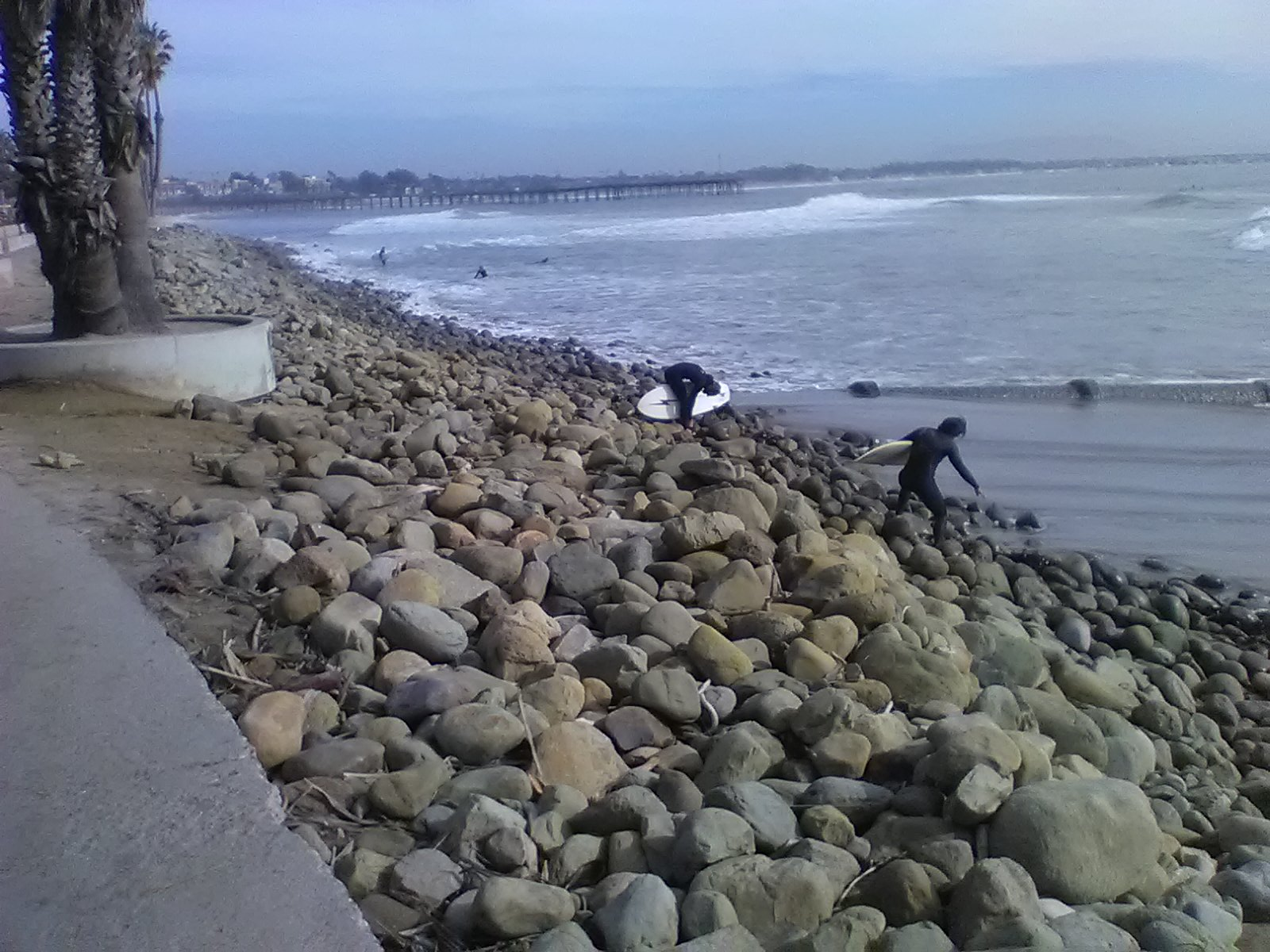
Surfer's Point, Ventura, California, January 2020

=== Surfer's Point, Ventura, California ===
In 2011, the Surfers' Point working group relocated the bike path and parking lot. To stabilize the area the project constructed a "cobble mattress" on the back beach. Sand was placed in the retreat zone to complement the cobbles and help rebuild the dunes. Later, the project constructed dunes using sand sourced from other beaches with excess sand. The project used grant funds from the California Coastal Conservancy and the Federal Highway Administration.

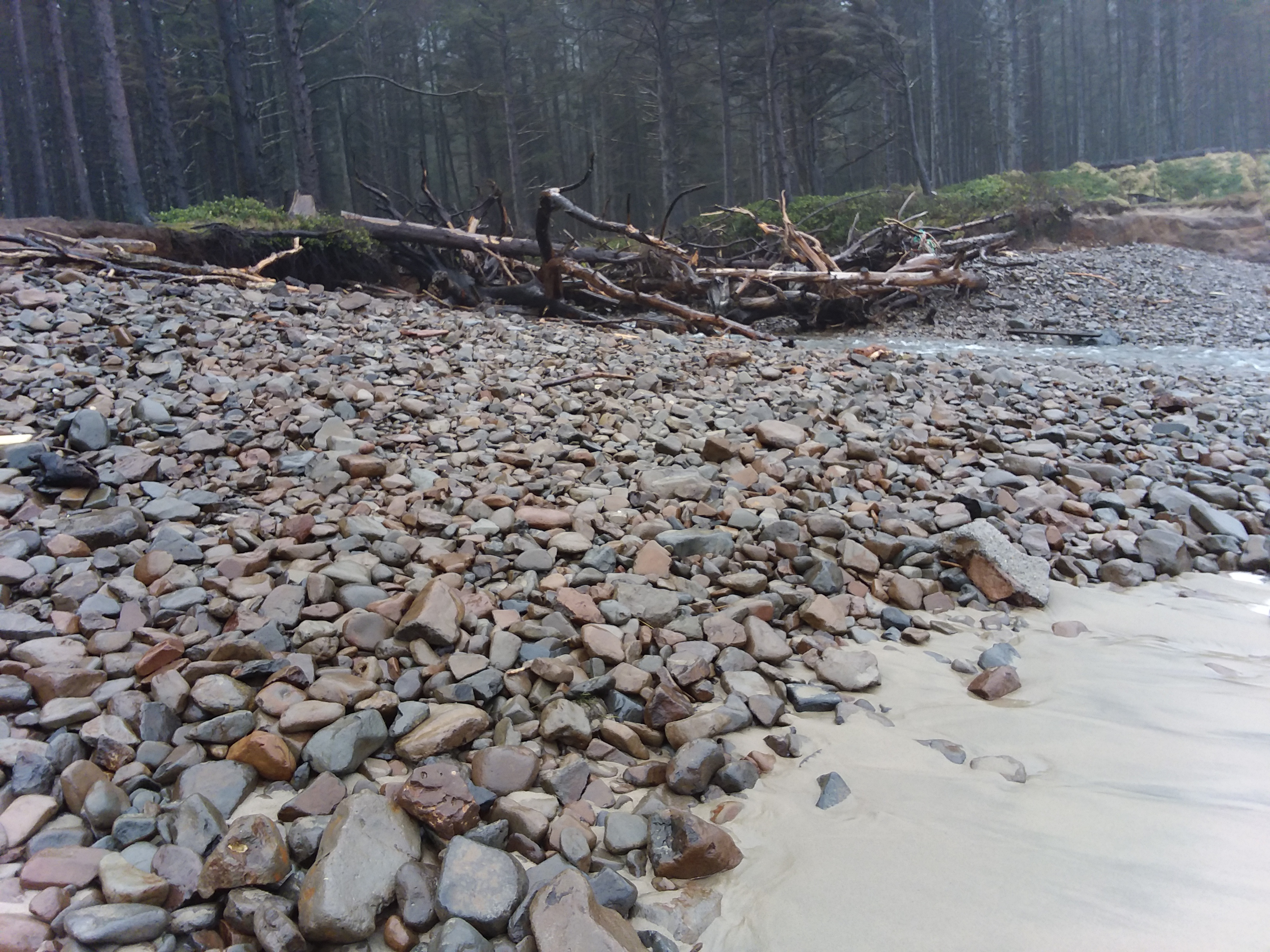
Cape Lookout State Park, Oregon, January 2020

=== Cape Lookout State Park, Oregon ===
Following storm damage to Cape Lookout State Park in 1999, some form of shore protection was sought. A conventional riprap revetment or seawall was deemed incompatible with this natural park setting, so the decision was made to construct a cobble berm that resembled the appearance and function of a natural cobble beach, backed by an artificial foredune that was reinforced by a core of sand-filled geotextile bags. Oregon Parks and Recreation Department completed construction of the 300-m long project by December 2000.

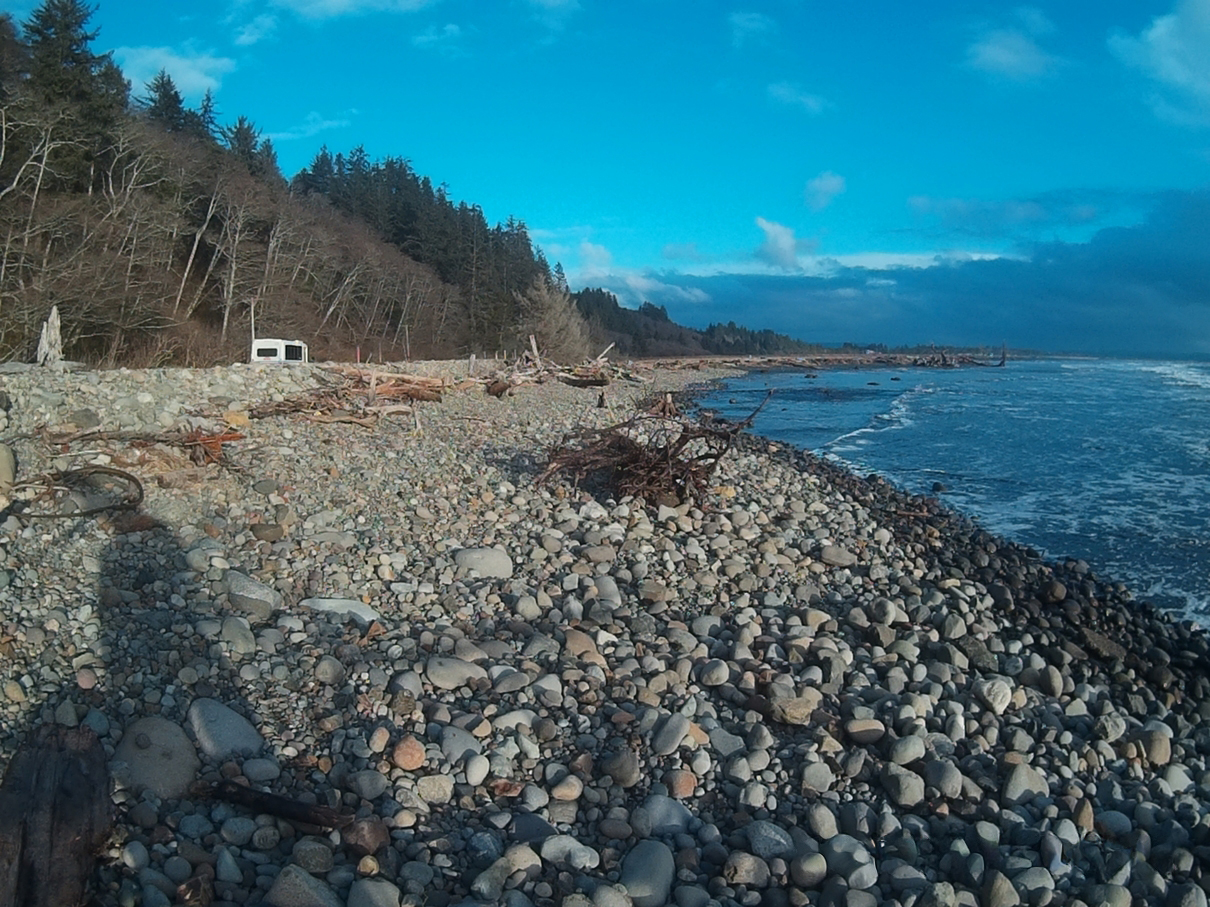
State Route 105, North Cove, Washington, January 2020

=== State Route 105, North Cove, Washington ===
In 1996 a rock jetty was constructed to protect State Route 105 near North Cove, which appeared to increase the erosion to the east by redirecting the force of the waves. In response, Washington State Department of Transportation constructed 780 feet of dynamic revetment along the south side of the highway right of way in the fall of 2017. The revetment generally performed as intended, with storm erosion transporting the berm material to the toe where it can buffer and dissipate wave energy. However, due to project footprint constraints, the cobble berm was constructed with a narrow width at the western end where wave energy is highest. This segment receives the brunt of waves that refract off adjacent riprap along the highway. Cobble re-nourishment was required several times during the first winter.

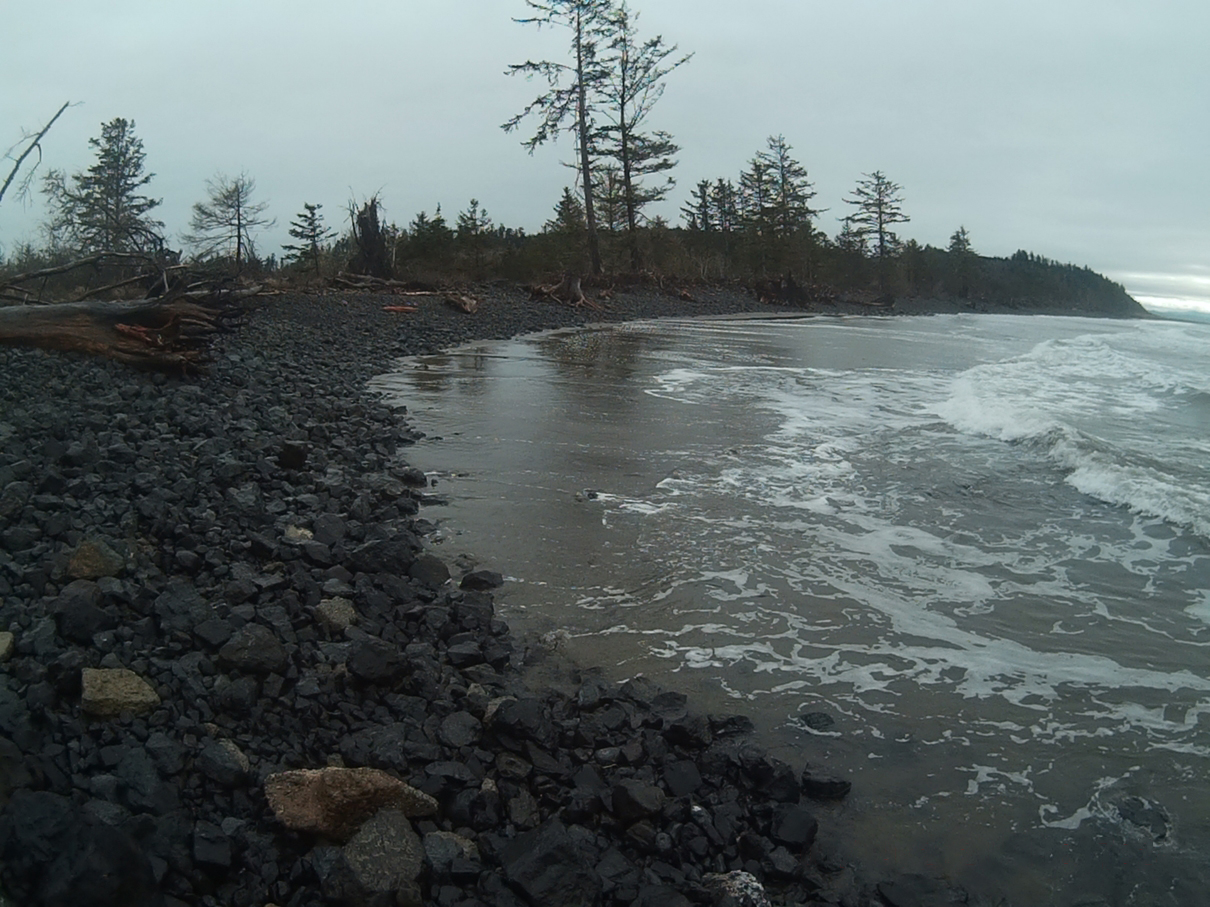
North Cove, Washington, January 2020

=== North Cove Community, North Cove, Washington ===
In 2016, as a response to what has been called the fastest erosion on the West Coast of the United States, the community of North Cove began placing unsorted pit-run basalt of predominantly cobble size along nearly 2 miles of shoreline to slow the erosion while engineers worked on a more permanent design. The community nonprofit group Wash Away No More supported the project through fundraising and work parties. Working with regulatory agencies, the principles of Adaptive management and Design with Nature were incorporated into the project to allow for learning and change based on periodic monitoring by Washington State Department of Ecology. As part of the monitoring, PIT tags were placed in individual rocks and their motion tracked over time. It was observed that the rocks that moved farthest weighed between 1 and 10 kg (2.2 and 22 lb) with an intermediate axis of about 10 to 20 cm (4 to 8 in). Angular and rounded rocks appeared to perform equivalently in this environment. Technical assistance and funding were provided by the Pacific County Conservation District. The lost beach quickly returned.

As Chairman of Pacific County Drainage District #1 and with support from Wash Away No More and the Pacific Conservation District, local cranberry farmer David Cottrell led the project through all phases from conception, construction, and adaptive management between 2016 and 2023. David undertook significant hands-on work alongside the local community to ensure cobble levels were maintained and carried out pioneering experiments on how and where to place cobble volume and the use of local driftwood to enhance coastal protection. This work drew the attention of coastal engineering academics in the USA and internationally, and David co-authored several papers on the topic of dynamic revetments.

== See also ==
- Shingle beach
- Storm beach
