= Point Robinson =

Geographic feature of Maury Island

Coordinates: 47°23′17″N 122°22′27″W

Point Robinson is the easternmost point on Maury Island, Washington, United States. It was originally a spit on Puget Sound that was named in 1841 for John Robinson, a crewmember on the United States Exploring Expedition led by U.S. naval officer Charles Wilkes.

The point encompasses the 10-acre (4.0 ha) Point Robinson Park, a public park managed by the Vashon Park District, which has several parks on Vashon and Maury islands. The park includes a shoreline with walking trails, picnic tables, forest trails, and a parking lot. The property was acquired by the United States Lighthouse Service in 1884 for construction of a fog signal station that was completed the following year. It was replaced by the Point Robinson Lighthouse in 1915 and the area was landscaped by the Works Progress Administration in 1939, which included removal of the spit and salt marsh.

A 12-acre (4.9 ha) portion of the lighthouse grounds was declared as excess property by the General Services Administration in 1959 and sold to the King County Department of Parks and Recreation for development of a public park, with the exception of a lease from the U.S. Coast Guard for the lighthouse itself. The park was transferred to the Vashon Park District in August 1995; the district also took over operations of the lighthouse grounds in 1997 and opened a museum with public tours. A large wooden sculpture of a troll named "Oscar the Bird King", part of the Northwest Trolls: Way of the Bird King series, was unveiled in September 2023 at the park.
