= Point Roberts Light =

Aid to navigation in Point Roberts, Washington

- Location: Point Roberts, Washington
- Coordinates: 48.9715°N 123.0827°W

Tower
- Foundation: Surface
- Construction: Skeleton tower
- Height: 25 feet (7.6 m)

Light
- Focal height: 9 m (30 ft)
- Characteristic: Two white flashes every 15 seconds

The Point Roberts Light is an aid to navigation located in Point Roberts, Whatcom County, Washington State, United States. The skeletal structure overlooks the Strait of Georgia from the end of a peninsula extending southward from Delta, British Columbia, Canada, across the 49th parallel into the U.S. It is part of Lighthouse Marine Park, a 21-acre (8.5 ha) recreational area operated by Whatcom County Parks and Recreation.

In 1908, the federal government bought 21 acres (8.5 ha) at the end of the peninsula for a light station. A true lighthouse was never built and the land was transferred to Whatcom County for use as a county park. In 2000, the Point Roberts Lighthouse Society was formed with the purpose of building a proper lighthouse on the point. According to a 2014 presentation to the Whatcom County Parks and Recreation Committee, the society had completed architectural designs and had funding in place with the goal of seeing the project, which would include a U.S. Coast Guard-approved navigational light, through to completion in 2015. In November of 2018, The Point Roberts Lighthouse Society announced that they were canceling their plans to construct a new lighthouse. They cited the city government's lack of action, and issues that the city and county governments had brought forward with regard to future costs that the new lighthouse would incur.
