= Cape Disappointment State Park =

State park in Washington state, US

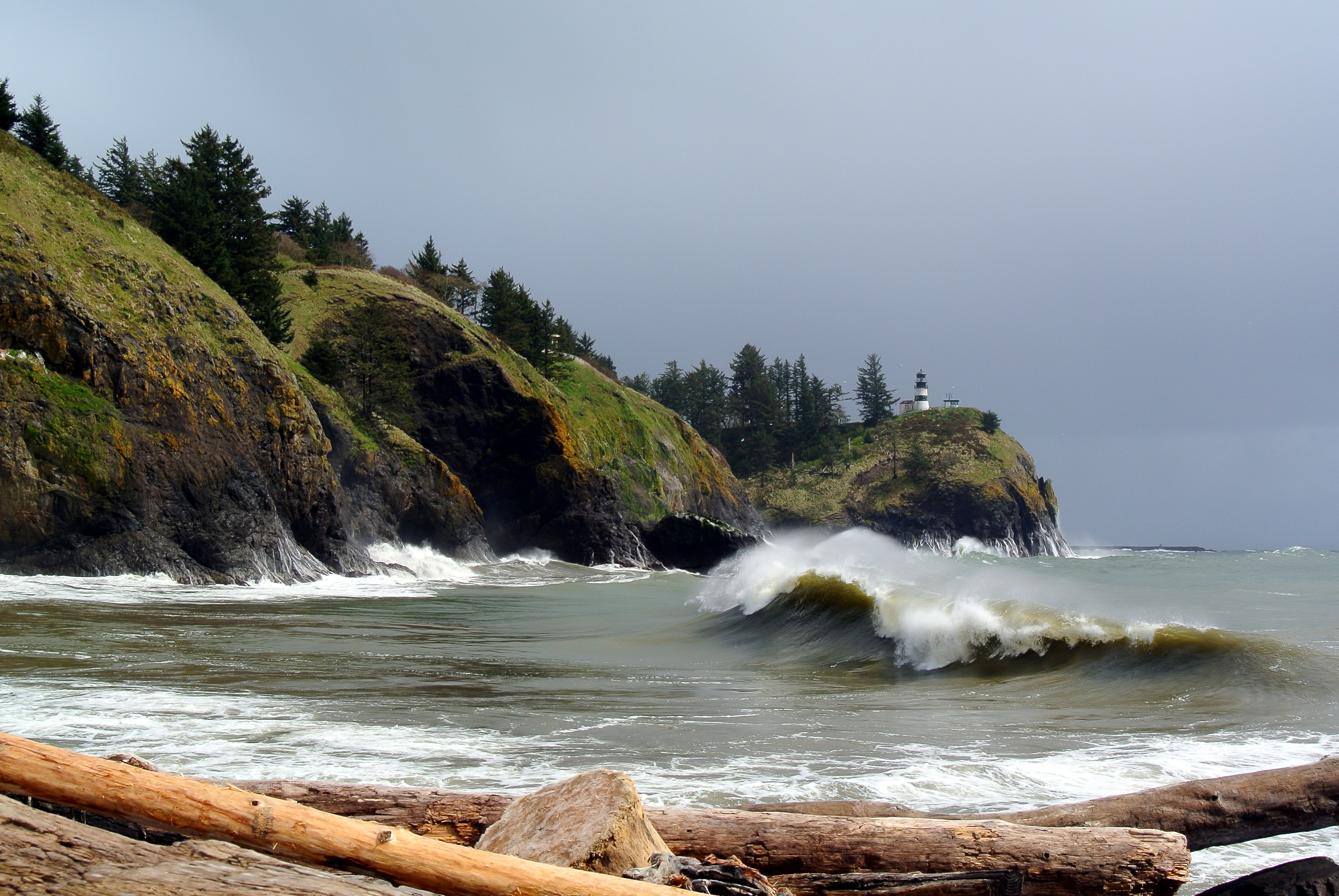
- South end of Cape Disappointment and its lighthouse

- Location within Washington (state) Location within the United States
- Location: Pacific County, Washington, United States
- Coordinates: 46°17′23″N 124°03′38″W
- Area: 2,023 acres (819 ha)
- Elevation: 62 ft (19 m)
- Established: Late 1950s
- Administrator: Washington State Parks and Recreation Commission
- Visitors: 1,022,109 (in 2024)
- Website: Official website

Cape Disappointment State Park (formerly Fort Canby State Park) is a public recreation area on Cape Disappointment, located southwest of Ilwaco, Washington, on the bottom end of Long Beach Peninsula, the northern headlands where the Columbia River meets the Pacific Ocean. The state park's 2,023 acres (819 ha) encompass a diverse landscape of old-growth forest, freshwater lakes, freshwater and saltwater marshes, and oceanside tidelands. Park sites include Fort Canby, the Lewis and Clark Interpretive Center, North Head Lighthouse, and Cape Disappointment Lighthouse. Cape Disappointment is one of several state parks and sites in Washington and Oregon that are included in Lewis and Clark National Historical Park.

== History ==
Cape Disappointment earned its name when Captain John Meares failed to cross the river bar in 1788. The feat was accomplished in 1792 by American Captain Robert Gray. The Lewis and Clark Expedition arrived at Cape Disappointment in 1805.

In 1862, during the American Civil War, a camp called Post at Cape Disappointment was established and fortifications existed here from that date to protect the northern approaches to the mouth of the Columbia River from possible attacks by Confederate raiders or foreign fleets. It was garrisoned by Company A, U.S. 9th Infantry Regiment and Company A, 8th Regiment California Volunteer Infantry in the District of Oregon. In 1863, its mate Fort Stevens was established on the south bank of the Columbia River. In 1864, the post was renamed Fort Cape Disappointment. Some Civil War-era fortifications still exist: the Tower (or Right) Battery, Left Battery, and Center Battery.

Fort Cape Disappointment was expanded and renamed Fort Canby in 1875. By 1906, when construction finished under the Endicott program, Fort Canby became part of the three-fort Harbor Defenses of the Columbia River as a subpost of Fort Stevens along with Fort Columbia. The fort was further expanded during World War II. After being decommissioned in the years following World War II, the fort was turned over to the state for use as a state park in the early 1950s. Workers with the Civilian Conservation Corps helped restore the fort and improved roads and trails during the 1930s.

== Activities and amenities ==
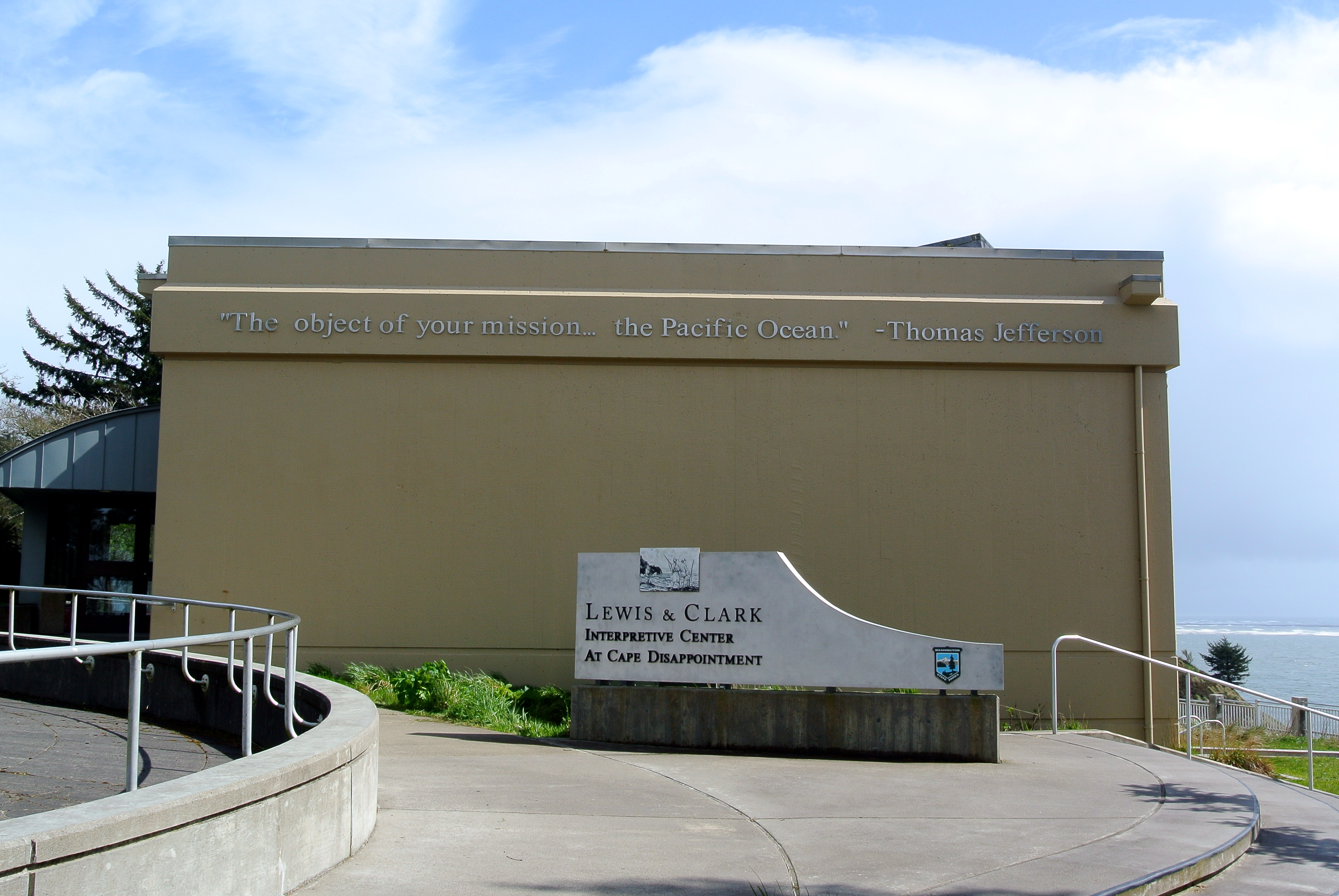
Lewis and Clark Interpretive Center

The Lewis and Clark Interpretive Center sits on a cliff that overlooks the confluence of the Columbia River and the Pacific Ocean. There are exhibits about the 1803–1806 Lewis and Clark Expedition from St. Louis, Missouri to the Pacific coast, the park's later history, including the lighthouses, U.S. Coast Guard and military activities, and the area's maritime and natural history.

The park offers camping and other overnight accommodations, eight miles (13 km) of hiking trails, stands of old-growth Sitka spruce, watercraft launch sites, picnicking facilities, and tours of the North Head Lighthouse. Many of the WWII-era military facilities still exist in a ruined state throughout the park and are accessible to the public.

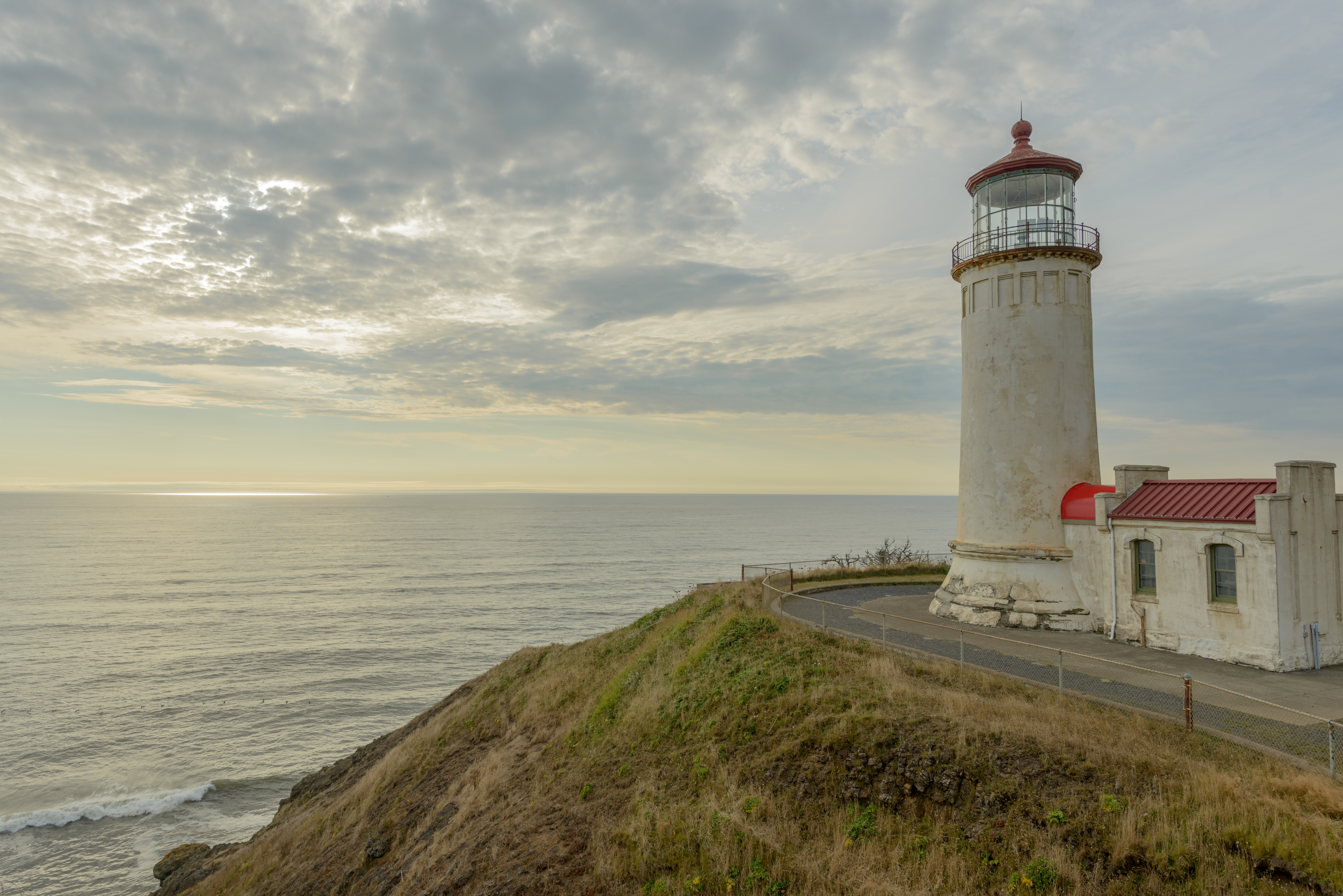
North Head Lighthouse

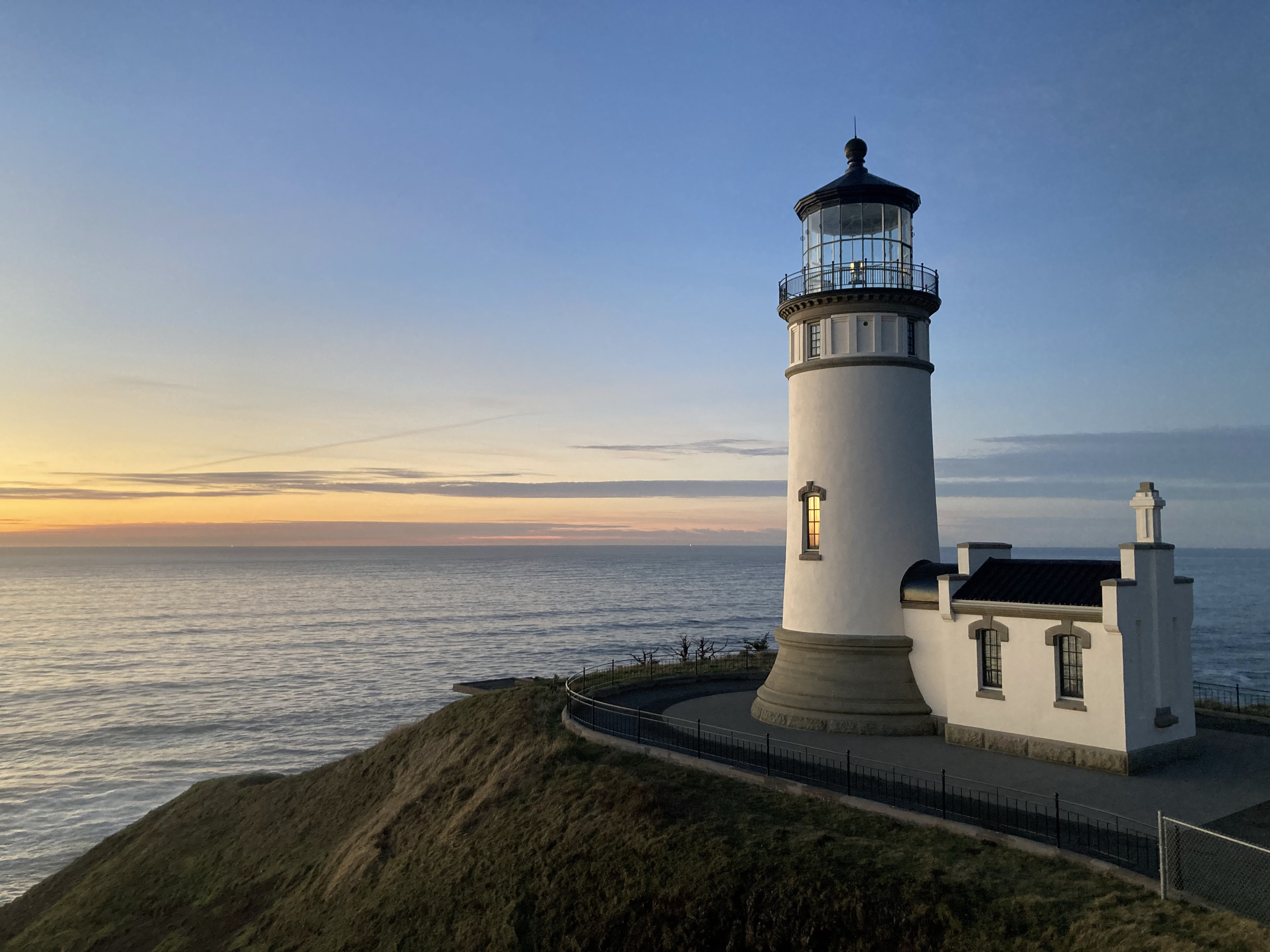
Recently restored North Head Lighthouse

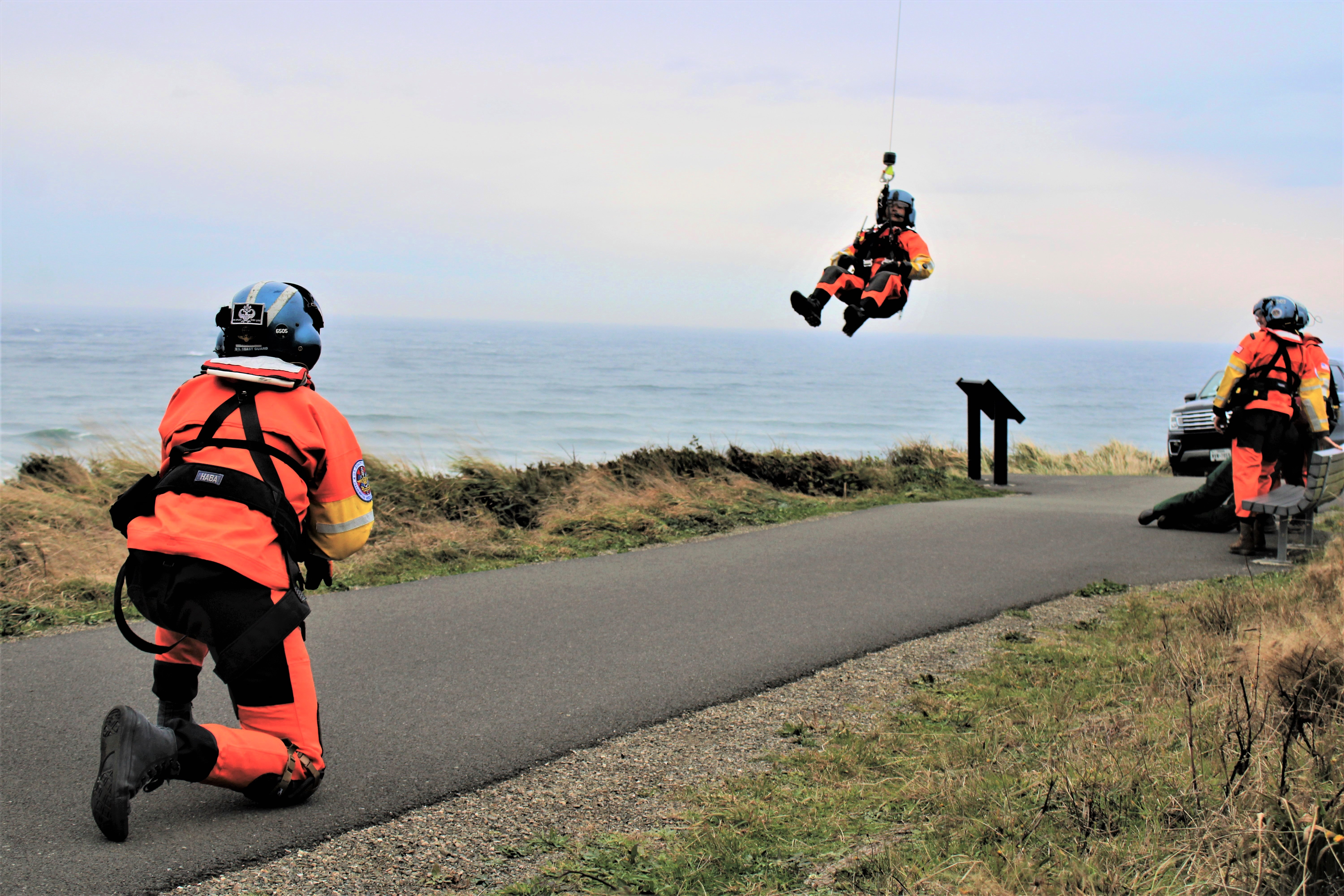
Coast Guard training near North Head Lighthouse
