= Warrior Rock Light =

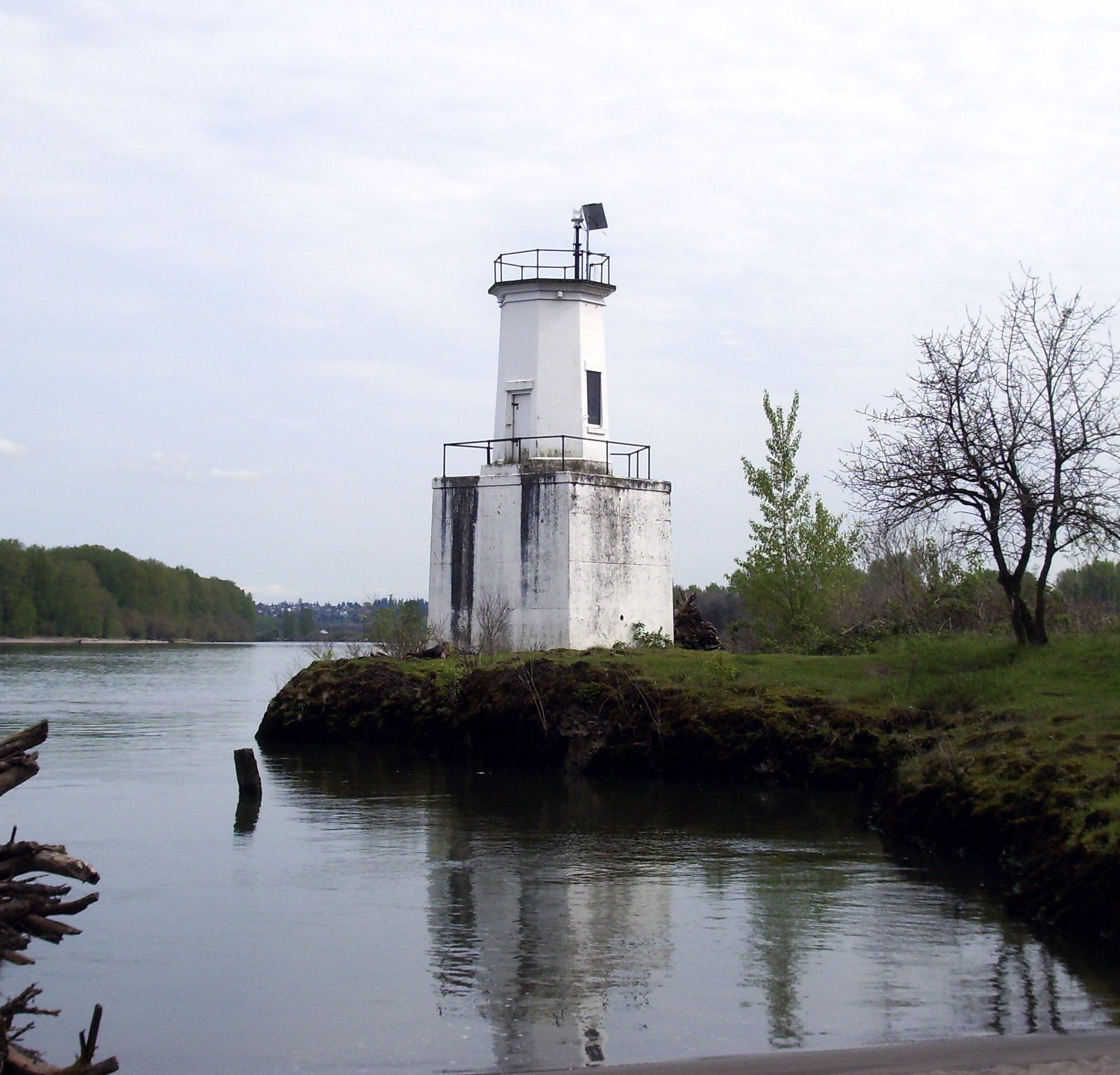
- Warrior Rock Light in 2008
- Location: Sauvie Island, Oregon, U.S.
- Coordinates: 45.84858°N 122.78835°W

Tower
- Constructed: 1877
- Foundation: sandstone
- Construction: wood frame originally, concrete since 1930
- Automated: 1930
- Height: 25 feet (7.6 m)
- Shape: octagonal

Light
- First lit: 1877/1889/1930/1970s
- Deactivated: 1969-1970s
- Focal height: 20 feet (6.1 m)
- Characteristic: Wht Fl 4s

Warrior Rock Light is a lighthouse on Sauvie Island in the U.S. state of Oregon, which helps guide river traffic on the Columbia River around the Portland, Oregon area. It once contained the Pacific Northwest's oldest fog bell. It is Oregon's smallest lighthouse, and the only lighthouse, or one of only two lighthouses, still operating in Oregon which are not on the Pacific Ocean, depending on whether the Umpqua River Lighthouse is considered to be on the coast or on the Umpqua River.

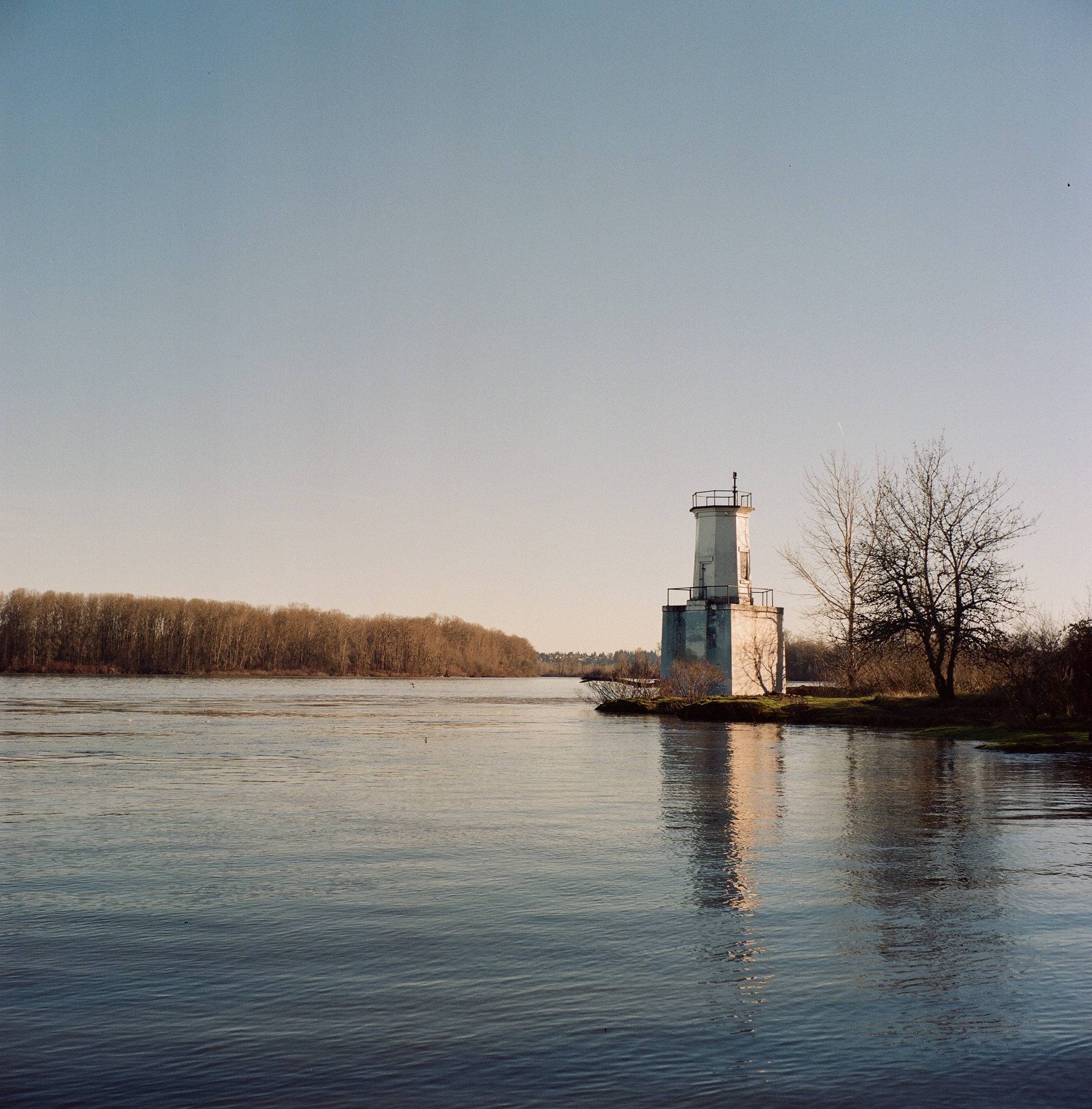
Warrior Rock Lighthouse in January 2022

== History ==
By 1877, navigational needs near Sauvie Island caused the United States Lighthouse Board to place two small red post lanterns at Warrior Rock. U.S. Congress authorized a lighthouse for the site in 1888. The structure was designed by Carl Leick and constructed in 1889 as a small, wood-frame building atop a sandstone base. It had living quarters below and an oil lamp beacon light with lens and a hand-cranked fog bell on top. The light was placed to warn of a bedrock reef which projects into the Columbia at the east tip of Sauvie Island, at Columbia river mile 87.2 (km 140.3).

The fog bell was cast in 1855 at the J. Bernhard & Co. foundry in Philadelphia and first installed at the Cape Disappointment Light at the mouth of the Columbia River, though the noise level of the ocean and winds led to its retirement in 1881 for a louder model. It was subsequently installed at the West Point Light in Seattle, but removed in 1887 to make way for a steam whistle. It was installed at Warrior Rock in 1889.

Lightkeepers used a skiff to approach the island from St. Helens, and the lighthouse itself in times of high seasonal water. The 1920s-era lightkeeper rigged an aerial cable to get to the lighthouse from the keepers quarters during such times.

The wooden house was replaced with a 28-foot (8.5 m) tall octagonal concrete tower in 1930 on the original sandstone foundation. Around the same time, the light was electrified. The site was an official water level gaging station from October 28, 1937, to November 18, 1937, and again from July 20, 1938, to September 9, 1938.

The lighthouse was struck by a barge on May 27, 1969, destroying the foundation and disabling the light and bell. While the Coast Guard was evaluating whether to repair or replace the tower, the fog bell was removed. It fell into the river and cracked, putting it out of commission. It is now outside the Columbia County Courthouse in St. Helens, close to a half-scale replica of the original Warrior Rock Light without foundation. The replica is one mile (1.6 km) NNW of the original site at 45.86302°N 122.79631°W.

The lighthouse presently operates with an automated beacon and bell. The exterior of the site is open to the public, and can be visited by a short boat ride from St. Helens, or a three-mile (5 km) hike from the north end of Reeder Road.

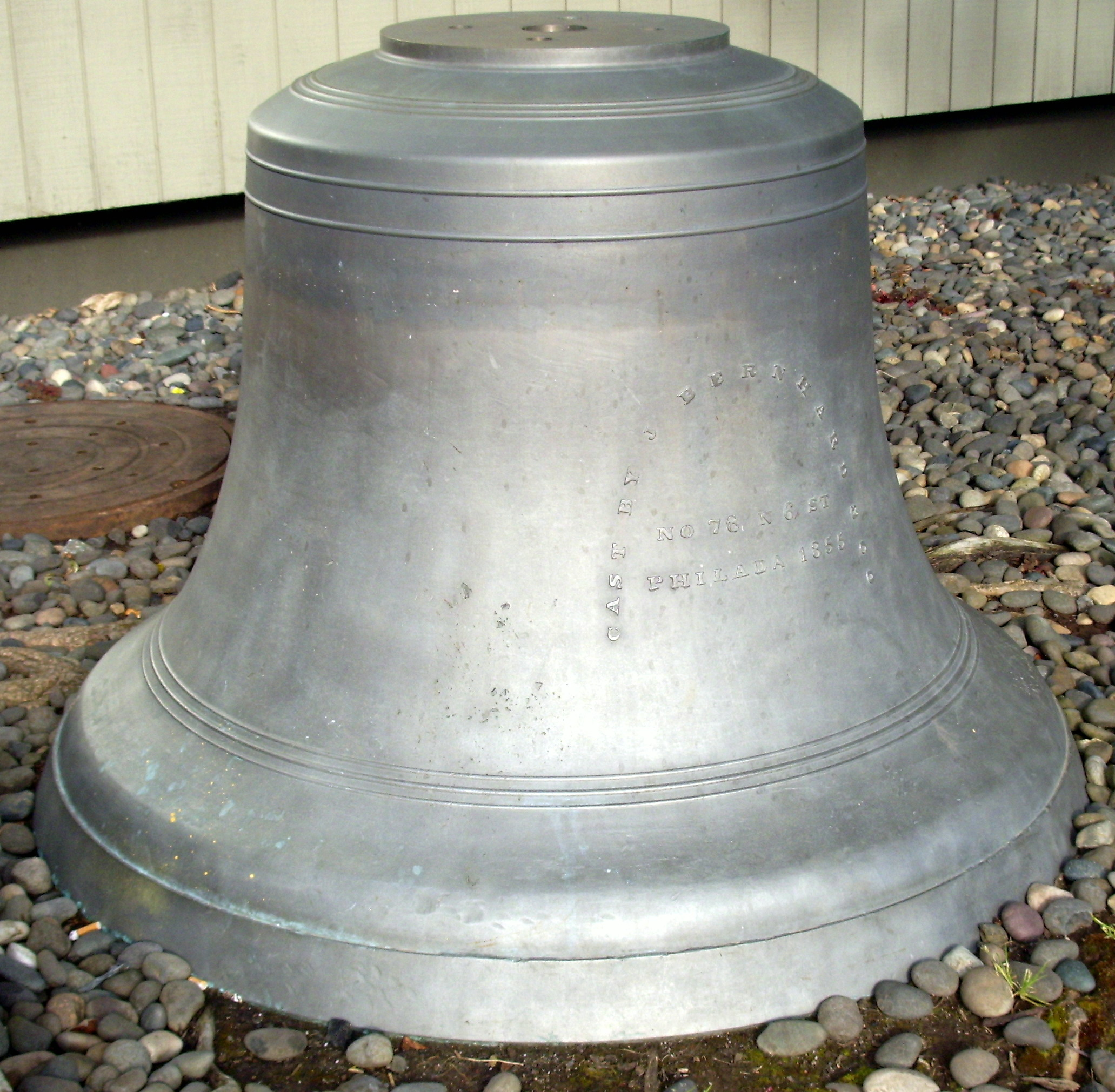
The fog bell from the Warrior Rock Light now sits outside the Columbia County Courthouse

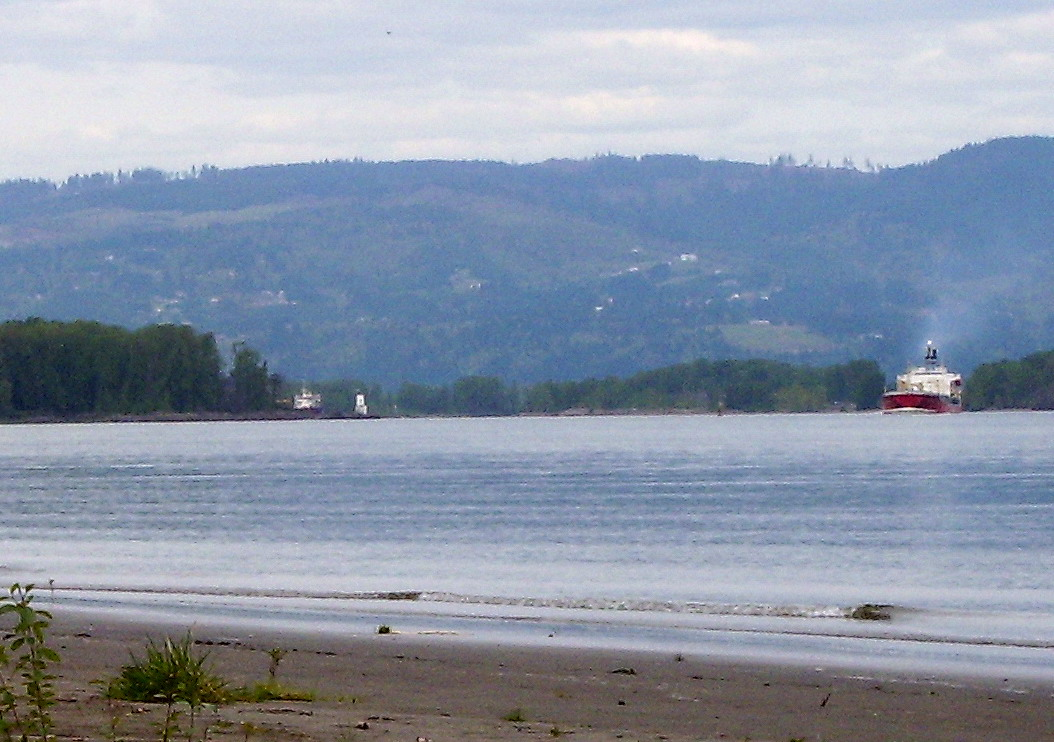
Two cargo ships approach the turn by Warrior Rock. The light is left of center.

== See also ==
- List of lighthouses on the Oregon Coast
