= Willapa Bay Light =

Lighthouse in Washington, United States

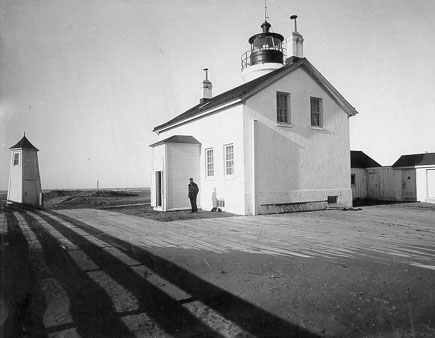
- Willapa Bay Light
- Location: Cape Shoalwater at entrance to Willapa Bay
- Coordinates: 46.71°N 124.08°W (est.)

Tower
- Shape: house with central tower on roof

Light
- First lit: 1858
- Deactivated: 1938
- Focal height: 81 feet (25 m)

The Willapa Bay Light, originally the Shoalwater Bay Light, was a lighthouse at the north side of the entrance to Willapa Bay in the U.S. state of Washington. It was demolished when shore erosion threatened to topple it.

== History ==
This was one of the earliest lights in Washington, and was constructed along the same pattern as the Smith Island Light. At the time the bay was still called Shoalwater Bay, and the lighthouse took the same name. Supplying the site was problematic, and the light was extinguished from 1859 to 1861. Eventually a lifesaving station was built immediately to the east. In 1889 the area was renamed Willapa Bay after a local tribe.

The entrance to the bay is extremely unstable, and the sandy cape on which the lighthouse stood was steadily eroded away. By the late 1930s, the foundations of the building were affected, and it was abandoned in 1938. By the 1940, it threatened to fall over the cliff on which it was perched, and the coast guard dynamited it, viewing it as a threat to the many bystanders come to see the precariously perched building. It was succeeded by various towers, but relentless erosion caused discontinuance of the light between 1991 and 1993. The same erosion also claimed some four square miles of North Cove, Washington, on the coast adjacent to the lighthouse, as well as the lifesaving station.
