= Browns Point Light =

Lighthouse in Washington, United States

Browns Point Lighthouse
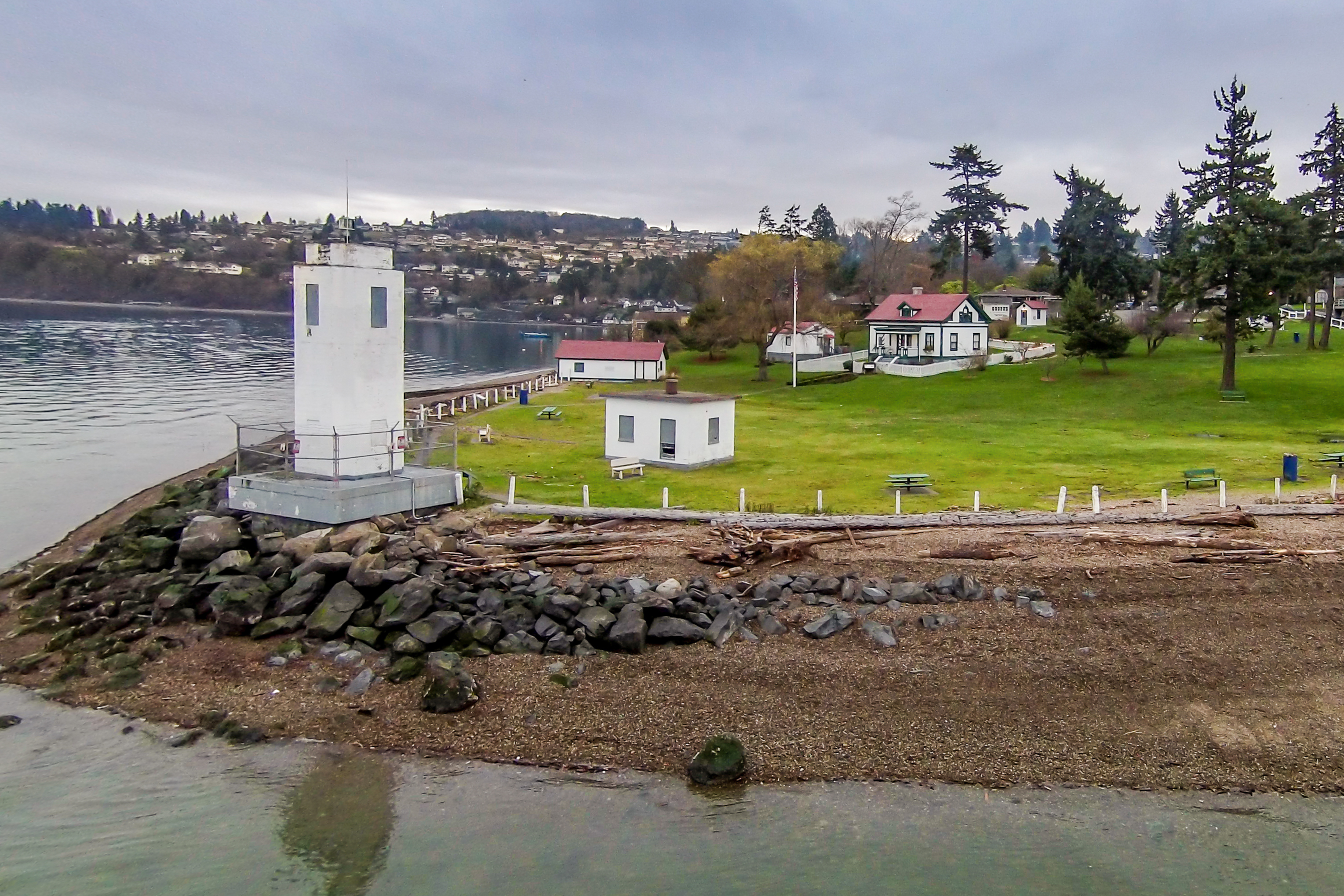
- Location: Browns Point, Washington
- Coordinates: 47°18′21.3″N 122°26′39.4″W

Tower
- Constructed: 1887
- Foundation: Concrete
- Construction: Concrete
- Automated: 1963
- Height: 34 feet (10 m) (38 feet (12 m) above sea level)
- Shape: Square without lantern
- Heritage: National Register of Historic Places listed place

Light
- First lit: 1933 (current tower); 1903 (previous tower); 1887 (first structure)
- Focal height: 12 m (39 ft)
- Lens: VRB-25
- Range: 12 nautical miles (22 km; 14 mi)
- Characteristic: Flashing white light every 5s, Light obscured from 217° to 002°. HORN: 2 blasts ev 30s (2s bl-2s si-2s bl-24s si).
- Browns Point Lighthouse and Keeper's Cottage
- U.S. National Register of Historic Places
- Nearest city: Tacoma, Washington
- Area: 2.5 acres (1.0 ha)
- Built: 1933
- Architectural style: Modernistic
- NRHP reference No.: 89000208
- Added to NRHP: February 16, 1989

The Browns Point Lighthouse is a lighthouse located near Tacoma on Browns Point at the east entrance to Puget Sound's Commencement Bay, Pierce County, Washington.

== History ==
Cupy the first light station on Browns Point, erected in 1887, consisted of a white light lens lantern on a white post that stood 12 feet (3.7 m) above sea level and 50 yards from the low tide shoreline. A wood-frame lighthouse and separate keepers cottage were built in 1901. The current lighthouse was built in 1933 and automated in 1963. The lighthouse plus the original keeper's cottage, oil house and boathouse are listed on the National Register of Historic Places. In 2021, the lighthouse was restored, in an effort led by the Points Northeast Historical Society, with $65,000 in donations from local residents. The restoration was led by Metro Parks Tacoma, and the lighthouse was re-dedicated on October 17, 2021.

== Public access ==
The Points Northeast Historical Society rents out the keeper's cottage with the renter serving as an honorary lightkeeper who conducts lighthouse tours on Saturday afternoons. The Society also operates two museums by the lighthouse: the History Center with changing history exhibits and the Boat House Museum with displays of a replica surfboat and maritime artifacts. The lighthouse is on the grounds of Browns Point Lighthouse Park which offers picnicking and scenic vistas of sea traffic and mountains.

== More reading ==
- Sharlene Nelson & Ted Nelson (1998). Umbrella Guide to Washington Lighthouses. Epicenter Press. ISBN 9780945397700.
