= Alki Point Light =

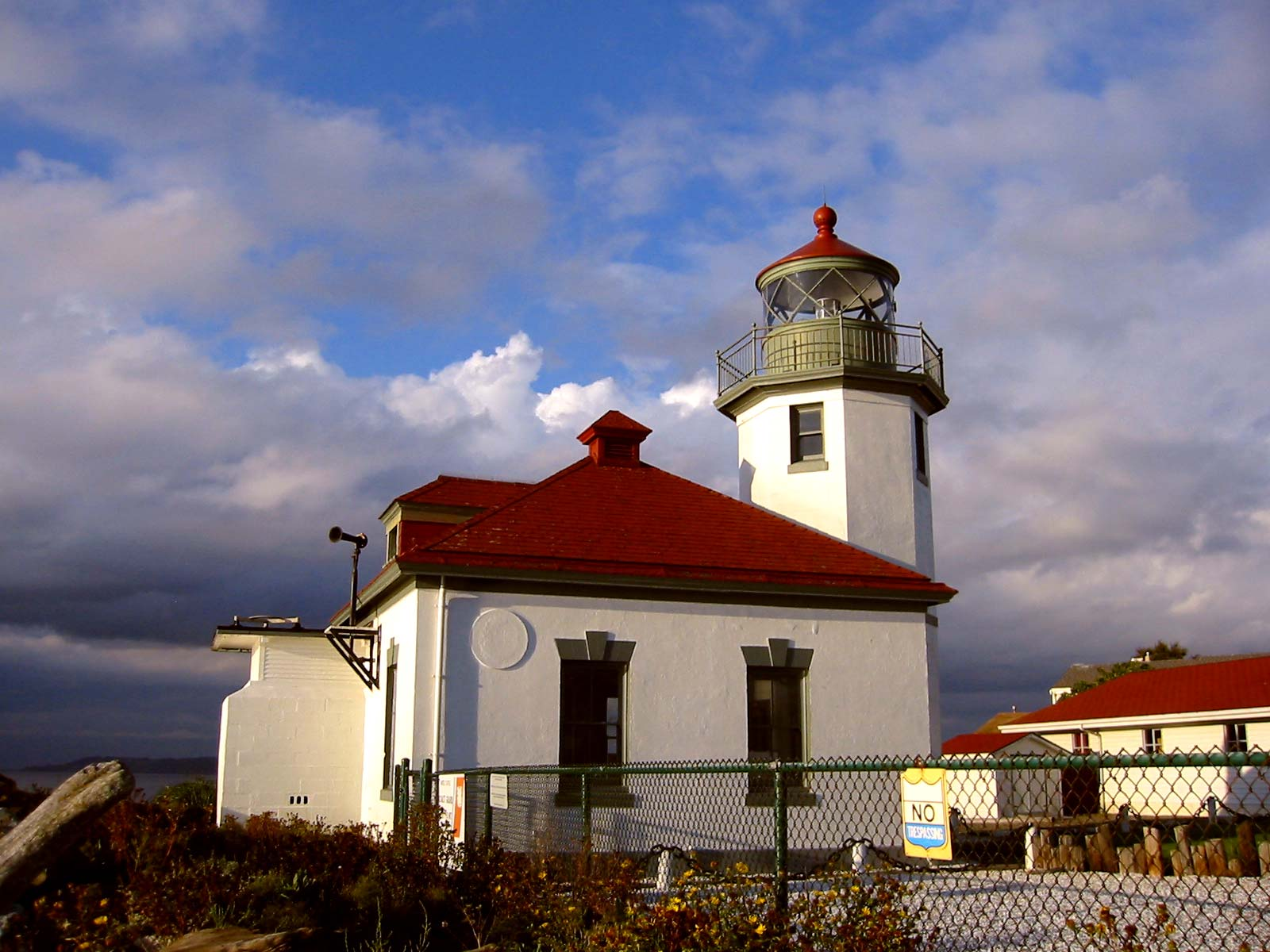
- Location: West Seattle, Washington
- Coordinates: 47°34′34″N 122°25′13″W

Tower
- Constructed: 1913
- Foundation: Concrete
- Construction: Masonry
- Automated: 1984
- Height: 37 feet (11 m) (39 feet (12 m) above sea level)
- Shape: Octagonal
- Markings: White with red and black trim

Light
- First lit: 1913
- Focal height: 12 m (39 ft)
- Lens: Fourth order Fresnel lens (removed), VRB-25 (current)
- Range: 15 nautical miles (28 km; 17 mi)
- Characteristic: Flashing White 5s. Emergency light isophase white 6s. Lighted throughout 24 hours.

The Alki Point Light is an active aid to navigation located on Puget Sound's Alki Point, the southern entrance to Seattle's Elliott Bay, King County, Washington. It is listed as Alki Point Light number 16915 in the USCG light lists.

== History ==
The first, unofficial, light established at Alki Point was a kerosene lantern said to have been hung on the side of a barn in the 1870s by farmer and property owner Hans Martin Hanson. In 1887, the United States Lighthouse Board recognized the need for an official light and placed a lens-lantern atop a wooden post at the point. As Hanson remained the property's owner, he was assigned to be lightkeeper at a salary of $15 per month.

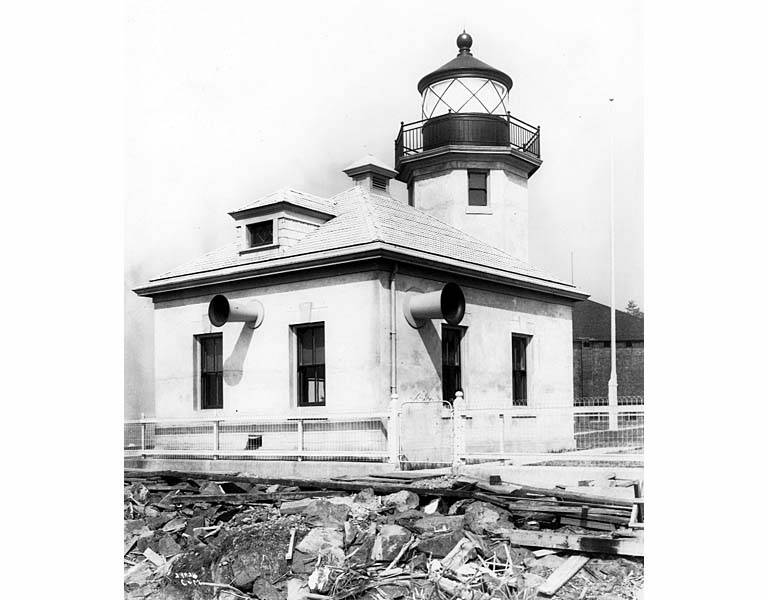
Alki Point Lighthouse in a 1914 photograph by Asahel Curtis

Hanson's son Edmund sold the point to the government in 1910. By 1913, the present structure comprising a 37-foot (11 m) octagonal brick tower with lantern and gallery, attached to a 1-story brick fog signal building, was complete. It is the twin of Point Robinson Lighthouse on Maury Island, built two years later.

The tower held a fourth order Fresnel lens that was visible at no less than 12 miles (19 km). Other site improvements included two residences for the lighthouse keepers. In 1962, the original Fresnel lens was replaced by a modern optic device (VRB-25 aerobeacon). The station was automated in 1984. Following modernization, the principal keeper's quarters became the home of the Commander of the Thirteenth Coast Guard District.

The active light station remains in the hands of the U.S. Coast Guard. Tours are periodically offered by the U.S. Coast Guard Auxiliary.
