= Browns Point, Washington =

Unincorporated community in Washington, United States

Browns Point
- CDP
- Location within the state of Washington
- Coordinates: 47°18′14″N 122°26′15″W
- Country: United States
- State: Washington
- County: Pierce

Area
  - Total: 0.403 sq mi (1.04 km^{2})
  - Land: 0.403 sq mi (1.04 km^{2})
  - Water: 0.000 sq mi (0 km^{2})
- Elevation: 85 ft (26 m)

Population (2010)
  - Total: 1,198
  - Density: 2,970/sq mi (1,150/km^{2})
- Time zone: UTC-8 (Pacific (PST))
  - Summer (DST): UTC-7 (PDT)
- ZIP code: 98422
- Area code: 253
- GNIS feature ID: 2584950

Browns Point is a census-designated place (CDP) in Pierce County, Washington, United States, bordered by Tacoma on the east and Puget Sound on all other sides. As of the 2020 census, Browns Point had a population of 1,263. The Tacoma neighborhood immediately adjacent to Browns Point is also referred to locally as "Browns Point" (although it is also often referred to as Northeast Tacoma).

== Geography ==
According to the United States Census Bureau, the CDP has a total area of 0.403 square miles (1.04 km^{2}), all land.

== History ==
Originally named Point Harris, after Alvin Harris, a sailmaker on the Wilkes Expedition, Browns Point was later renamed by residents for an early landowner.

== Culture ==
Browns Point is home to the Browns Point Lighthouse, which, although now fully automated, was once fully staffed and was first lit on December 12, 1887.

The community is supported by the local Browns Point Improvement Club, which owns much of the land adjacent to the lighthouse. The club is best known in the Pacific Northwest for its fundraiser, the Browns Point Salmon Bake. Started in the 1940s by Browns Point pioneer and Puyallup tribal member Jerry Meeker, the festival is held in the first weekend of August in even-numbered years.

== Education ==
The area is served by Tacoma Public Schools, a public school district. It is zoned to Browns Point Elementary School, Meeker Middle School, and Stadium High School.

== Demographics ==
Historical population
Census	Pop.	Note	%±
2010	1,198		—
2020	1,263		5.4%
U.S. Decennial Census; 2000 2010

Browns Point first appeared as a census designated place in the 2010 U.S. census.

=== Racial and ethnic composition ===
Browns Point CDP, Washington – Racial and ethnic composition Note: the US Census treats Hispanic/Latino as an ethnic category. This table excludes Latinos from the racial categories and assigns them to a separate category. Hispanics/Latinos may be of any race.
Race / Ethnicity (NH = Non-Hispanic)	Pop 2010	Pop 2020	% 2010	% 2020
White alone (NH)	1,025	1,011	85.56%	80.05%
Black or African American alone (NH)	18	22	1.50%	1.74%
Native American or Alaska Native alone (NH)	14	10	1.17%	0.79%
Asian alone (NH)	36	51	3.01%	4.04%
Native Hawaiian or Pacific Islander alone (NH)	8	3	0.67%	0.24%
Other race alone (NH)	0	3	0.00%	0.24%
Mixed race or Multiracial (NH)	48	90	4.01%	7.13%
Hispanic or Latino (any race)	49	73	4.09%	5.78%
Total	1,198	1,263	100.00%	100.00%
