= Point Robinson Light =

Point Robinson Lighthouse
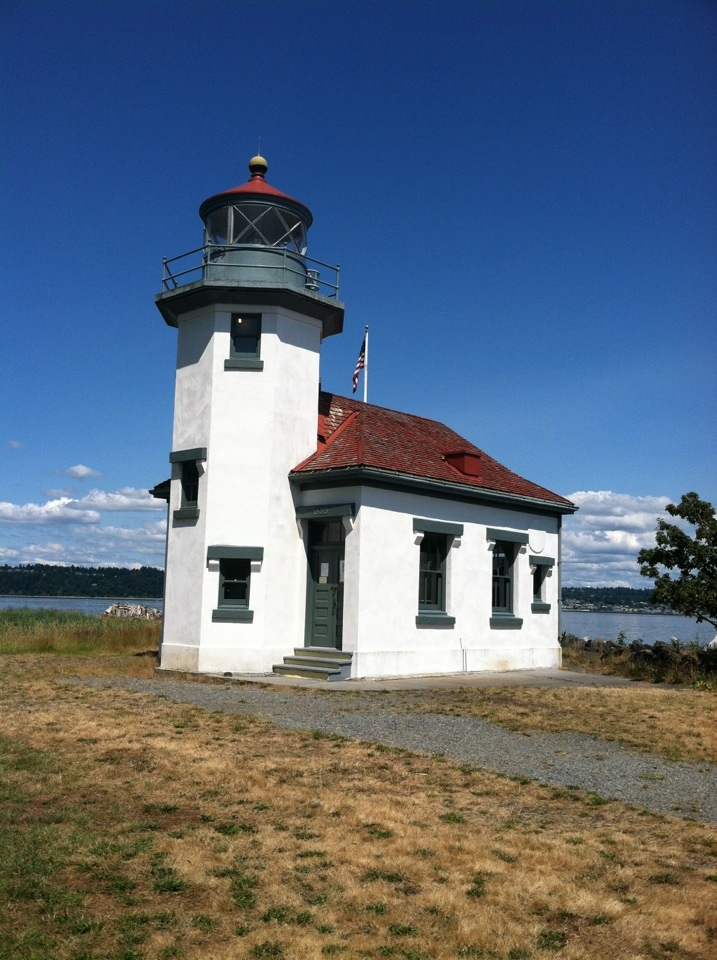
- Location: NE end of Point Robinson, Vashon, Washington, USA
- Coordinates: 47.3881°N 122.3750°W

Tower
- Constructed: 1887
- Foundation: Surface
- Construction: Masonry and concrete
- Automated: 1978
- Height: 38 feet (12 m)
- Shape: Octagonal with attached dwelling
- Heritage: National Register of Historic Places listed place

Light
- First lit: 1915 (current tower)
- Focal height: 12 m (39 ft)
- Lens: Fifth order Fresnel lens
- Range: 10 nautical miles; 19 kilometres (12 mi)
- Characteristic: FI(2) W 12s (White light, 3 s on, 1 s off, 3 s on, 5 s off)
- Point Robinson Light Station
- U.S. National Register of Historic Places
- U.S. Historic district
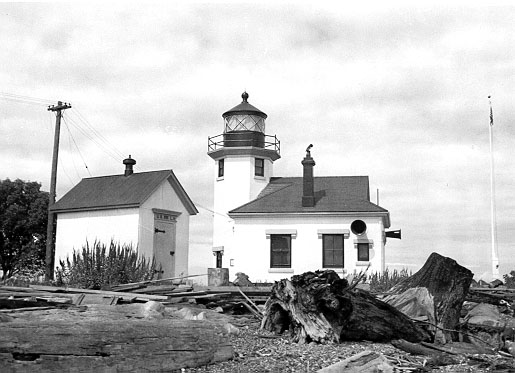
- Area: 12.9 acres (5.2 ha)
- Built: 1884-1919
- Built by: U.S. Lighthouse Service, 13th Dist.; U.S. Lighthouse Board
- Architectural style: Classical Revival/Colonial Revival
- MPS: Light Stations of the United States MPS
- NRHP reference No.: 04000359
- Added to NRHP: April 21, 2004

The Point Robinson Light is an operational aid to navigation and historic lighthouse on Puget Sound, located at Point Robinson, the easternmost point of Maury Island, King County, in the U.S. state of Washington. The site was listed on the National Register of Historic Places in 2004.

== History ==
Development of a navigational aid at Point Robinson began in 1884, when the Lighthouse Service purchased 24 acres there for $1,000. Construction of a fog signal station began that year with the facility seeing dedication on July 1, 1885. The original boiler and 12-inch steam whistle came from Oregon's Point Adams Light. A one-and-a-half-story keeper's house was built nearby. A second keeper's quarters was constructed in 1907.

The point's first light arrived in 1887, when a lens lantern, shining persistent red, was attached to a 25-foot (7.6 m) post. In 1894, the post was replaced by an open wooden tower which held the light at 31 feet (9.4 m). The current lighthouse was built in 1915, a twin of the Alki Point Lighthouse. With its 38-foot (12 m) tower and fifth-order Fresnel lens, the light could be seen 10 nautical miles; 19 kilometres (12 mi). The flashing pattern is on for three seconds, off for one second, on for another three seconds, and off for five seconds. The light was automated in 1978, using the original fifth-order Fresnel lens. In 2008, the Coast Guard replaced the original Fresnel light with a replaceable plastic beacon mounted outside the lantern room. The original Fresnel lens remains in the lantern room where it can be viewed by visitors.

A 100-foot radar tower was built at the point as part of the Puget Sound Vessel Traffic Control System at a cost of US$4 million in 1989. GPS facilities were added in the 1990s.

=== Last uniformed keeper ===
The last Coast Guardsman stationed at Robinson Point Light Station was Jerry Bolstad in 1989. He and his family occupied one of the lighthouse keeper's houses. In addition to the station's general maintenance, the last keeper restored the original Daboll three-trumpet fog signal, air compressor, and diesel engines as part of a historical display and conducted tours. One of the vintage Daboll trumpets was attached to a bottle of compressed air so visitors could experience its powerful sound.

== Park ==
In the early 1990s, local residents learned of plans to lease land for commercial purposes on Point Robinson. With the whiff of a potential seafood-processing plant in the air, the organization Keepers of Point Robinson was created and, coupled with the Vashon-Maury Island Park and Recreation District, negotiated a 15-year lease on the property with the Coast Guard.

The site is now a 10-acre (4.0 ha) shoreline park and historical and marine conservancy managed by Vashon Park District. The park district owns the upland part of the park, with the remainder on long-term lease from the Coast Guard. Keepers of Point Robinson work with the park district to maintain the site and offer the two keepers' dwellings as weekly rentals.
