= Burrows Island Light =

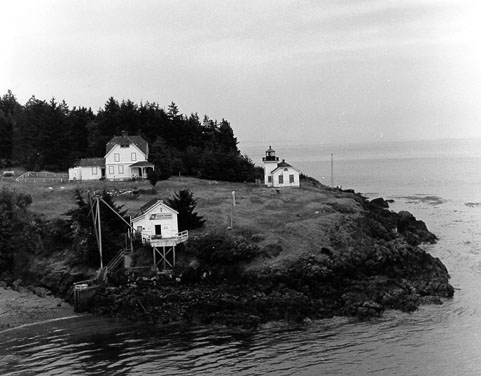
- Burrows Island Light (USCG)
- Location: Burrows Island, Washington
- Coordinates: 48°28′41″N 122°42′49″W

Tower
- Constructed: 1906
- Foundation: Stone
- Construction: Wood
- Automated: 1972
- Height: 34 feet (10 m) (57 feet (17 m) above sea level)
- Shape: White square tower on fog signal building

Light
- First lit: 1906
- Focal height: 17 m (56 ft)
- Lens: Fourth-order Fresnel lens (removed)
- Range: 9 nautical miles (17 km; 10 mi)
- Characteristic: Flashing white light every 6 s. Emergency light Iso W 6 s, operates at reduced intensity. Horn: 2 blasts ev 30s (2s bl-2s si-2s bl-24s si).

The Burrows Island Light is a lighthouse on the western tip of Burrows Island, facing Rosario Strait, near Anacortes, in Skagit County, Washington.

== History ==
After repeated requests to Congress, and a petition from local mariners, funding for the construction of a light on Burrows Island was authorized on February 24, 1903. The drawings were made by noted architect, Carl Leick, and a contract was awarded to Barnett and Farmer for construction in May 1905. The Lighthouse Board selected the westernmost tip of Burrows Island, near Anacortes, Washington, as the site for the new light station. The island covering more than 400 acres (160 ha) stands just off Fidalgo Island, and presents a rugged aspect to sailors. The Burrows Island Light, faces Rosario Strait and was first lit April 1, 1906. The Seattle Post-Intelligencer published a small photograph and enthusiastic article on May 2, 1906. "The fog signal station is a model plant and contains all the latest improvements. A fourteen foot trumpet is used to sound the warnings instead of a bell, and the contrivance is operated by the power of two powerful gasoline engines."

The Daboll trumpet fog signal blew the next year for 329 hours. The 34 square feet (3.2 m^{2}) tower is attached to the fog signal building and once held a fourth-order Fresnel lens.

Captain James Hermann and his assistant Edward Pfaff were the first keepers at the station, which consisted of four buildings: the lighthouse itself, a boathouse and shop, a small coal and oil building and the massive duplex which dominates the station.

The wood-framed lighthouse stands nears the island's shoreline, which mainly consists of sharp and rocky drop-offs that demanded a derrick be constructed for loading the station boat and bringing in supplies. Automated in 1972, the Fresnel lens was replaced with modern optics and a helicopter landing pad located where the lighthouse keeper's home formerly stood.

Land at the lighthouse station was purchased in 1978 by the Washington State Parks and Recreation Commission (WSPRC) from the U.S. government. Additional land on the island, including tidal areas in the northeast of the island, were purchased by WSPRC in 1990, 1992, 1993, and 2003, with the result that WSPRC owns more than 85% of the island. There is a primitive campsite for use by human-powered boaters on the northeast part of the island.

In 2011, the Northwest Schooner Society began a long-term restoration project of the property and its weather-damaged and vandal-ravaged buildings. The lighthouse was listed on the National Register of Historic Places in 2024.

A replica of the lighthouse is located in Warrenton, Oregon.
