= North Head Light =

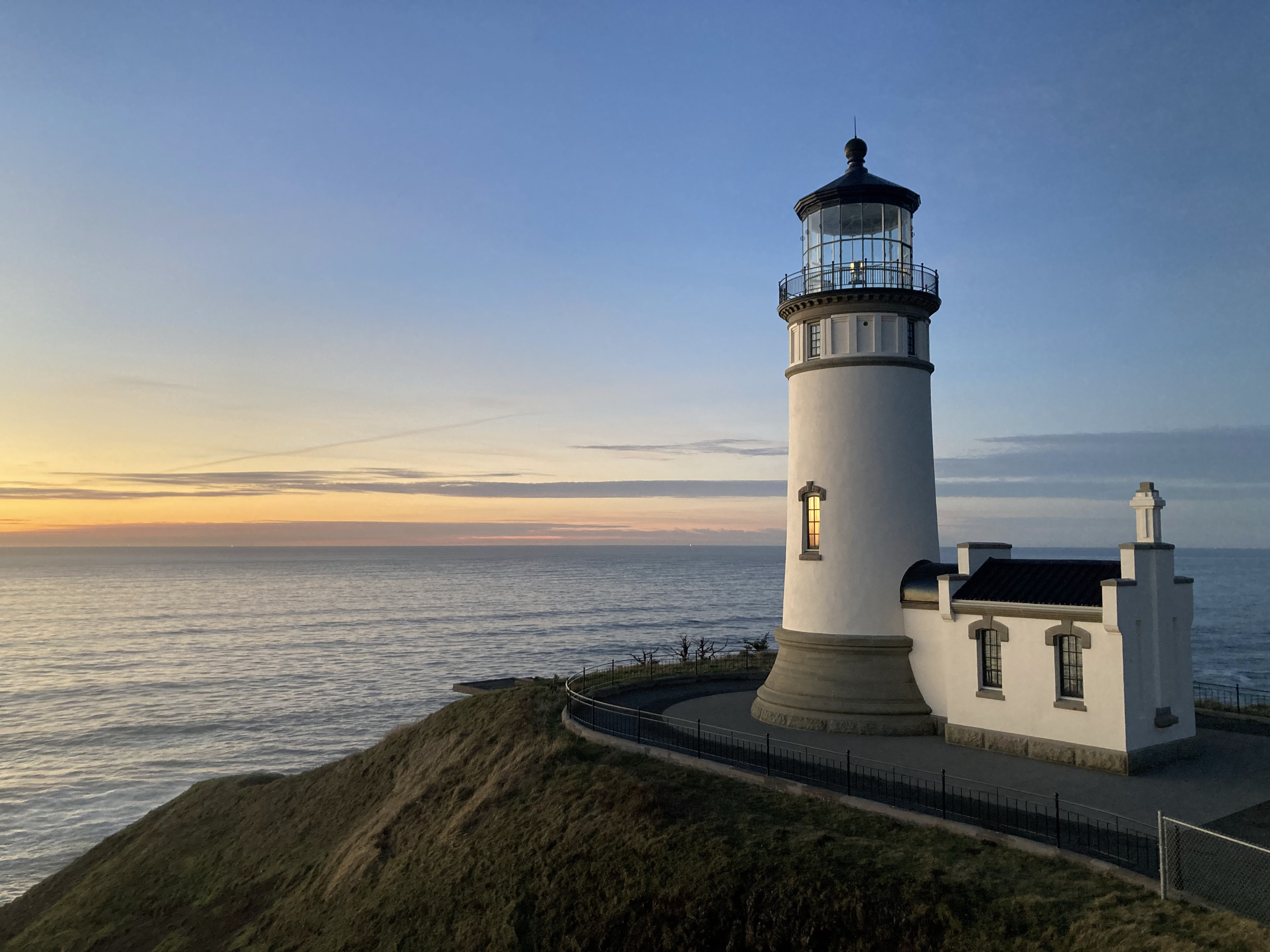
- Location: Ilwaco, Washington
- Coordinates: 46.2990°N 124.0785°W

Tower
- Constructed: 1897-1898
- Foundation: Surface
- Construction: brick
- Automated: 1961
- Height: 65 feet (20 m)
- Shape: Conical

Light
- First lit: 1898
- Focal height: 194 feet (59 m)
- Lens: First order Fresnel lens
- Range: 26 nmi (48 km; 30 mi)
- Characteristic: Two white flashes every 30 s, flashes separated by 7.5 s

North Head Lighthouse is an active aid to navigation overlooking the Pacific Ocean from North Head, a rocky promontory located approximately two miles north of Cape Disappointment and the mouth of the Columbia River, near Ilwaco, Pacific County, in the U.S. state of Washington. It is part of Cape Disappointment State Park.

== History ==
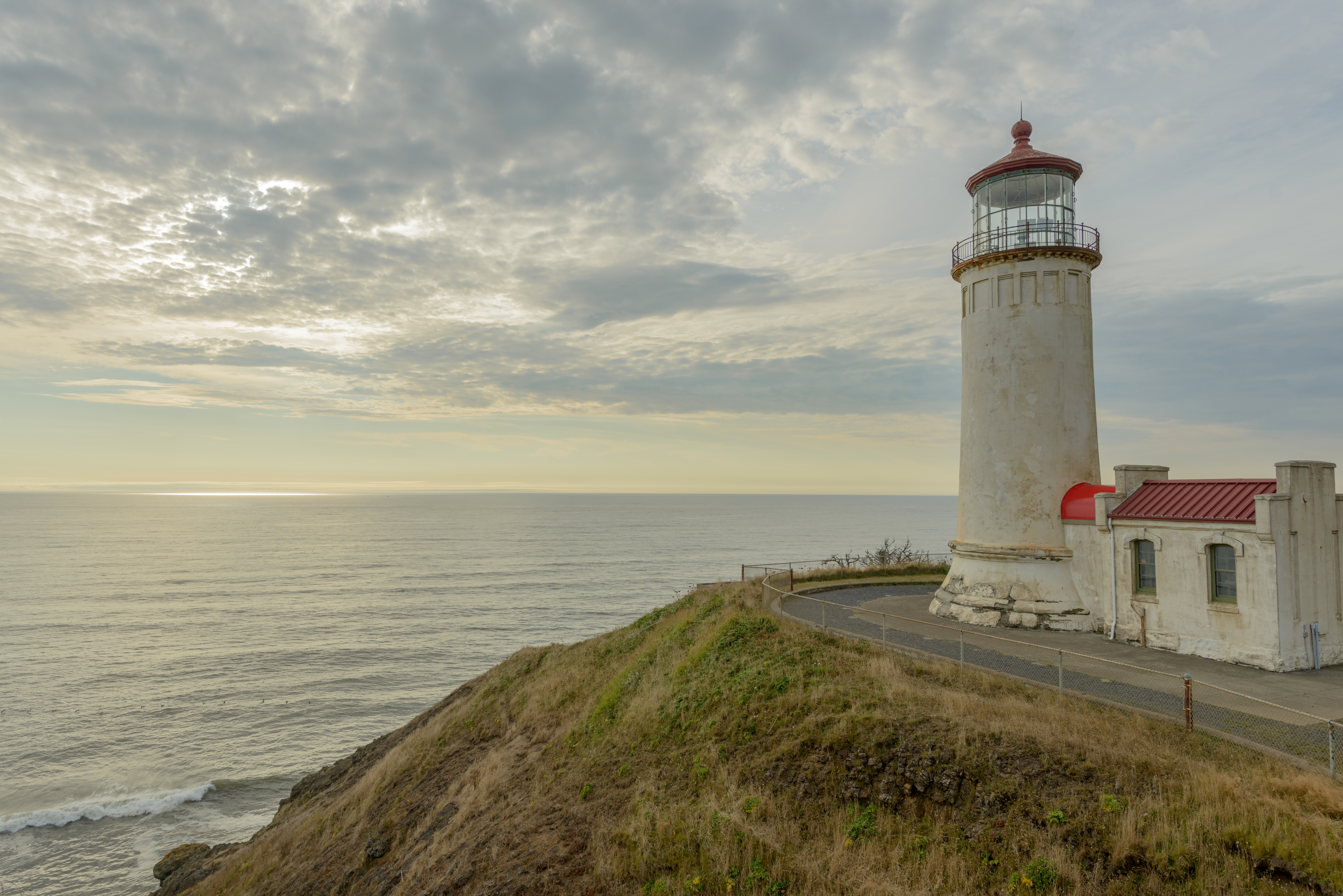
Lighthouse in 2014, before restoration

The North Head Light was constructed in 1897 after mariners complained that the Cape Disappointment Lighthouse, installed in 1856, was obscured to ships approaching from the north by the headland extending southwest from the light. The new lighthouse was designed by Carl Leick, with a 65-foot (20 m) tower set on a 130-foot (40 m) cliff directly facing the ocean and clearly visible to ships traveling from the north. Other buildings included two oil houses east of the lighthouse, a keeper's residence, duplex housing for two assistant keepers, a barn, and outbuildings, all of which remain on site.

The first-order lens at the Cape Disappointment Light was moved to North Head and was first lit at its new location in 1898. In 1935, the first-order lens was replaced by a fourth-order lens. That lens was eventually replaced by an aerobeacon in the 1950s, and later by a modern optic mounted outside the tower. A Crous-Hinds aero marine beacon was put into use at the lighthouse August 1, 1961, and the light was automated in December of that year. A VRB-25 aerobeacon was installed in 1999. The original first-order lens is on display at the Lewis and Clark Interpretive Center in Cape Disappointment State Park. The fourth-order lens is exhibited at the Columbia River Maritime Museum in Astoria, Oregon.

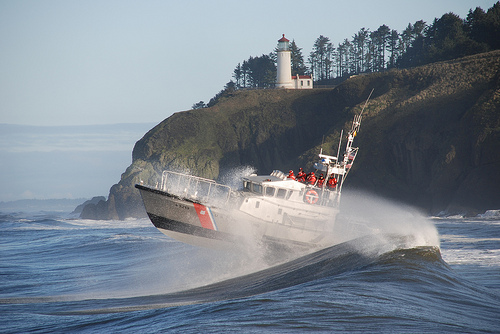
US Coast Guard training in a motor lifeboat off Cape Disappointment, November 2009

In November 2012, the Coast Guard turned over ownership of the light station to Washington State Parks. Repair and restoration efforts are being undertaken by the state and an independent preservation group, Keepers of the North Head Lighthouse, which is an arm of the non-profit Friends of the Columbia River Gateway.

== In the media ==
=== Television ===
North Head Light was featured on an episode of Ghost Adventures entitled "Graveyard of the Pacific: Cape Disappointment" that aired in 2018 on the Travel Channel. The team of paranormal team investigated the Caretaker's House that have reports of a spirit named Mary whose suspicious suicide came into question after she came here with her husband Alexander Pesonen, the first keeper, in 1898. They also explore surrounding forest high on the cliffs near Deadman's Hollow that is said to be haunted by the spirits of Chinook Indians.

== See also ==
- List of lighthouses in the United States

== More reading ==
Nelson, Sharlene; Nelson, Ted (1998). Umbrella Guide to Washington Lighthouses. Epicenter Press. ISBN 9780945397700.
