= List of lighthouses in California =

There are several lighthouses in the U.S. state of California, including a few listed on the National Register of Historic Places.

Lighthouse Friends (California)

Name	Image	Location	Coordinates	Year first lit	Automated	Year deactivated	Current Lens	Focal Height
Alcatraz Island Light		San Francisco (Alcatraz Island)	37°49′34.5″N 122°25′19.8″W	1854 (First); 1909 (Current)	1963	Active	DCB-24	214 ft (65 m)
Anacapa Island Light		Anacapa Island	34.015827°N 119.359548°W	1912 (First); 1932 (Current)	1967	Active	DCB-24	277 ft (84 m)
Ano Nuevo Light		Año Nuevo Island	37.1083°N 122.3378°W (Island coordinates)	1890 (First); 1914 (Last)	Never	1948 (Cut down in 1976)	None	Unknown
Ballast Point Light		San Diego (Point Loma)	32°41′11.0″N 117°13′57.0″W	1890	Never	1960^{A} (Demolished)	None	Unknown
Battery Point Light		Crescent City	41.744094°N 124.203099°W	1856	1953	Active (Inactive: 1965–1982)	375mm	77 ft (23 m)
Cape Mendocino Light		Shelter Cove	40°26′23.66″N 124°24′21.71″W	1868	1951	1971^{B} (Replaced)	None	422 ft (129 m)
Carquinez Strait Light		Vallejo	38.067816°N 122.213832°W	1910	Never	1951 (Replaced by beacon)	None	56 ft (17 m)
East Brother Island Light		Richmond	37.963233°N 122.433643°W	1874	1969	Active	FA 251	61 ft (19 m)
Farallon Island Light		San Francisco (Farallon Islands)	37.698966°N 123.001651°W	1856	1972	Active	VRB-25	358 ft (109 m)
Fort Point Light		San Francisco	37°48′38″N 122°28′38.4″W	1855 (First); 1864 (Current)	Never	1934 (Replaced by bridge)	None	110 ft (34 m)
Humboldt Harbor Light		Eureka (Humboldt Bay)	40°46′7.1″N 124°13′15.7″W	1856	Never	1892 (Collapsed in 1933)	None	45 ft (14 m)
Lime Point Light		San Francisco	37.825447°N 122.478321°W	1900	1961	Active	None	20 ft (6.1 m)
Lions Lighthouse for Sight		Long Beach	33.7602334°N 118.1941101°W	2000	Unknown	Unknown	Unknown	65.62 ft (20.00 m)
Long Beach Light		Long Beach (Port of Long Beach)	33.723237°N 118.186821°W	1949	Always	Active	Unknown	50 ft (15 m)
Los Angeles Harbor Light		Los Angeles (Port of Los Angeles)	33.70857°N 118.25160°W	1913	1973	Active	DCB-24	73 ft (22 m)
Mare Island Light		Vallejo (Mare Island)	38.074834°N 122.250464°W	1873	Never	1917 (Demolished in the 1930s)	None	76 ft (23 m)
Mile Rocks Light		San Francisco	37.792765°N 122.510366°W	1906	1966	Active	DCB-24	49 ft (15 m)
Oakland Harbor Light		Oakland	37.781335°N 122.243817°W	1890 (First); 1903 (Last)	Never	1966^{C}	None	Unknown
Parkers' Lighthouse		Long Beach	33.7598744°N 118.1920629°W	Unknown	Unknown	Unknown	Unknown	Unknown
Piedras Blancas Light		San Simeon	35°39′56.3″N 121°17′03.6″W	1875	1975	Active	VRB-25	142 ft (43 m)
Pigeon Point Light		Half Moon Bay	37°10′54.3″N 122°23′38.1″W	1872	1974	Active	DCB-24	148 ft (45 m)
Point Arena Light		Point Arena	38°57′17.1″N 123°44′25.8″W	1870 (First); 1908 (Current)	1977	Active	DCB-224	155 ft (47 m)
Point Arguello Light		Lompoc (Point Arguello)	34°34′37.4″N 120°38′49.9″W	1901 (First); 1934 (Last)	1934	1967^{D}	None	124 ft (38 m)
Point Blunt Light		San Francisco (Angel Island)	37°51′11.64″N 122°25′9.25″W	1915 (First); 1956 (Current)	1976	Active	Unknown	60 ft (18 m)
Point Bonita Light		San Francisco (Point Bonita)	37.815614°N 122.529578°W	1855 (First); 1877 (Current)	1980	Active	Second-order Fresnel	124 ft (38 m)
Point Cabrillo Light		Caspar	39°20′54.97″N 123°49′34.02″W	1909	1973	Active	Third-order Fresnel	81 ft (25 m)
Point Conception Light		Lompoc (Point Conception)	34°26′55.51″N 120°28′14.71″W	1856 (First); 1882 (Current)	1973	Active	VRB-25	133 ft (41 m)
Point Diablo Light		San Francisco (Golden Gate)	37.820171°N 122.499423°W	1923	Always	Active	Unknown	Unknown
Point Fermin Light		Los Angeles (San Pedro)	33.705420°N 118.293649°W	1874	Never	1942	None	120 ft (37 m)
Point Hueneme Light		Port Hueneme	34.145176°N 119.210019°W	1874 (First); 1941 (Current)	1972	Active	LED	52 ft (16 m)
Point Knox Light		San Francisco	—N/a	1900	Unknown	1963 (Demolished)	None	Unknown
Point Loma Light (old)		San Diego (Point Loma)	32.671983°N 117.240938°W	1855^{E}	Never	1891	Third-order Fresnel (Deactivated)	462 ft (141 m)
Point Loma Light (new)		San Diego (Point Loma)	32.665071°N 117.242621°W	1891	1973	Active	VLB-44	88 ft (27 m)
Point Montara Light		Montara	37.536503°N 122.519311°W	1900 (First); 1928 (Current)	1970	Active	FA 251	70 ft (21 m)
Point Pinos Light		Pacific Grove	36.633389°N 121.933783°W	1855	1975	Active	Third-order Fresnel	89 ft (27 m)
Point Reyes Light		Point Reyes Station (Point Reyes)	37.995621°N 123.023215°W	1870	1975	Active	First-order Fresnel	265 ft (81 m)
Point San Luis Light		Avila Beach	35.160362°N 120.760882°W	1890	1974	1975^{D}	None	116 ft (35 m)
Point Sur Light		Carmel-by-the-Sea	36°18′22.79″N 121°54′05.36″W	1889	1972	Active	DCB-224	270 ft (82 m)
Point Vicente Light		Rancho Palos Verdes	33.741867°N 118.410738°W	1926	1973	Active	Third-order Fresnel	155 ft (47 m)
Punta Gorda Light		Petrolia	40.249433°N 124.350220°W	1912	Never	1951	None	Unknown
Roe Island Light		Roe Island	38.067856°N 122.028166°W	1891	Never	1945 (Later destroyed)	None	41 ft (12 m)
Rubicon Point Light		South Lake Tahoe	38°59′45″N 120°05′41″W	1919	Never	1921	None	200 ft (61 m)
Santa Barbara Light		Santa Barbara	34.396320°N 119.722625°W	1856 (First); 1928 (Current)	1928	Active	Unknown	142 ft (43 m)
Santa Cruz Light		Santa Cruz	36°57′05.34″N 122°01′36.36″W	1870 (First); 1967 (Current)	1941	Active?	Unknown	60 ft (18 m)
Santa Cruz Breakwater Light		Santa Cruz (Santa Cruz harbor)	36°57′38.5″N 122°00′08.0″W	1964 (First); 2002 (Current)	Always	Active	Unknown	60 ft (18 m)
Southampton Shoal Light		San Francisco Bay	37°52′54.981″N 122°24′00.837″W	1905	Never	1960 (Moved to yacht club)	None	Unknown
St. George Reef Light		Crescent City	41.83633°N 124.37587°W	1892	Never	Active (Inactive: 1975–2012)	Unknown	146 ft (45 m)
Sugar Pine Point Light		Tahoma	39.061266°N 120.113971°W	1921	Never	1985^{D}	None	Unknown
Table Bluff Light		Table Bluff	40°41′45.02″N 124°16′26.16″W	1892	1953	1971	None	Unknown
Trinidad Head Light		Trinidad	41°3′7.0″N 124°9′5.2″W	1871	1974	Active	375mm	196 ft (60 m)
Yerba Buena Light		San Francisco; Yerba Buena Island	37°48′26.27″N 122°21′44.29″W	1875	1958	Active	Unknown	95 ft (29 m)

== Notable Faux Lighthouse ==
Name	Image	Location	Year built	Status	Lens used	Height
Passamaquoddy Lighthouse (Used in the 1977 movie Pete's Dragon)		Los Osos	1976	torn down after filming	Fresnel Lens (Replica)	52 ft (16 m)

== Notes ==
A. Ballast Point Light was moved in 1960 to the bell tower which had served as a fog signal building as the 1890 tower had been declared unsafe. The light shone from the top of the bell tower until 1961 when it was replaced by an offshore light.
B. The tower was abandoned in 1971 when the beacon was moved to a nearby modern pole. This light was discontinued in 2013 fifteen years after the old tower was moved to a new spot and restored.
C. Parts of the old structure now have separate owners, today an automated beacon is in active service.
D. Light moved to a pole.
E. Old Point Loma Light was built a few months after the lighthouse at Point Pinos making it the second oldest in the state still standing.
