= Pacific Grove =

Pacific Grove may refer to:

- Pacific Grove, Bonifacio Vale, Manila City, a location in the Grand Theft Auto III video game
- Pacific Grove, California, a coastal city in Monterey County, California in the United States
- Pacific Grove High School, a public high school located in Pacific Grove, California
- Pacific Grove Municipal Golf Links, a public 18-hole golf course owned by the city of Pacific Grove, California
