= Point Adams Light =

- Location: south of Columbia Bar
- Coordinates: 46.188333°N 123.977778°W

Tower
- Foundation: probably brick
- Construction: redwood frame
- Height: 49 feet (15 m)

Light
- First lit: 1875
- Deactivated: 1899
- Focal height: 50 feet (15 m)
- Lens: fourth order French lens
- Range: 16 nautical miles (30 km; 18 mi)
- Characteristic: 1875–1881: flashing red and white, 10 s, fog signal 1881-1899: fixed red

Point Adams Light was a lighthouse near the mouth of the Columbia River on the Oregon Coast of the United States. The lighthouse was designed by Paul J. Pelz, who also designed Point Adams's sister stations, Point Fermin Light in San Pedro, California, East Brother Island Light in Richmond, California, Mare Island Light, in Carquinez Strait, California (demolished in the 1930s), Point Hueneme Light in California (replaced in 1940), and Hereford Inlet Light in North Wildwood, New Jersey, all in essentially the same style. It operated from February 15, 1875, until 1899, when it became obsolete by the extension of the south jetty and the establishment of the Lightship Columbia in 1892. The lighthouse was considered a fire hazard and demolished in 1912.

It was located about a mile south of Point Adams—named by Captain Robert Gray in 1792 —near what is now Battery Russell in Fort Stevens State Park. The combination of the Point Adams Light with the Cape Disappointment Lighthouse on the north side of the river effectively framed the entrance to the Columbia.

The keeper's quarters and light were a combined structure, similar to the Yaquina Bay Light, in Newport, and used the same structure, materials, and optics as Point Fermin Light south of Los Angeles, California.

The light was changed from alternating red and white to fixed red on January 21, 1881, to reduce confusion with the nearby just-completed Tillamook Rock Light. The change caused HMS Fern Glen to run aground, evidently unaware of the change. At the same time, the fog signal was removed: it had long been criticized by mariners as being inaudible over waves crashing on shore.

The keeper considered the biggest maintenance problem to be the prevention of sand accumulation at the base of the lighthouse. Fences were unsuccessfully attempted at one point.

After decommissioning, the light was replaced by the Desdemona Sands Light in December 1901. It was finally burned down by the Lighthouse Service in 1912.

== See also ==
- List of lighthouses on the Oregon Coast
