= Point Pinos Lighthouse =

19th-century lighthouse in Pacific Grove, California

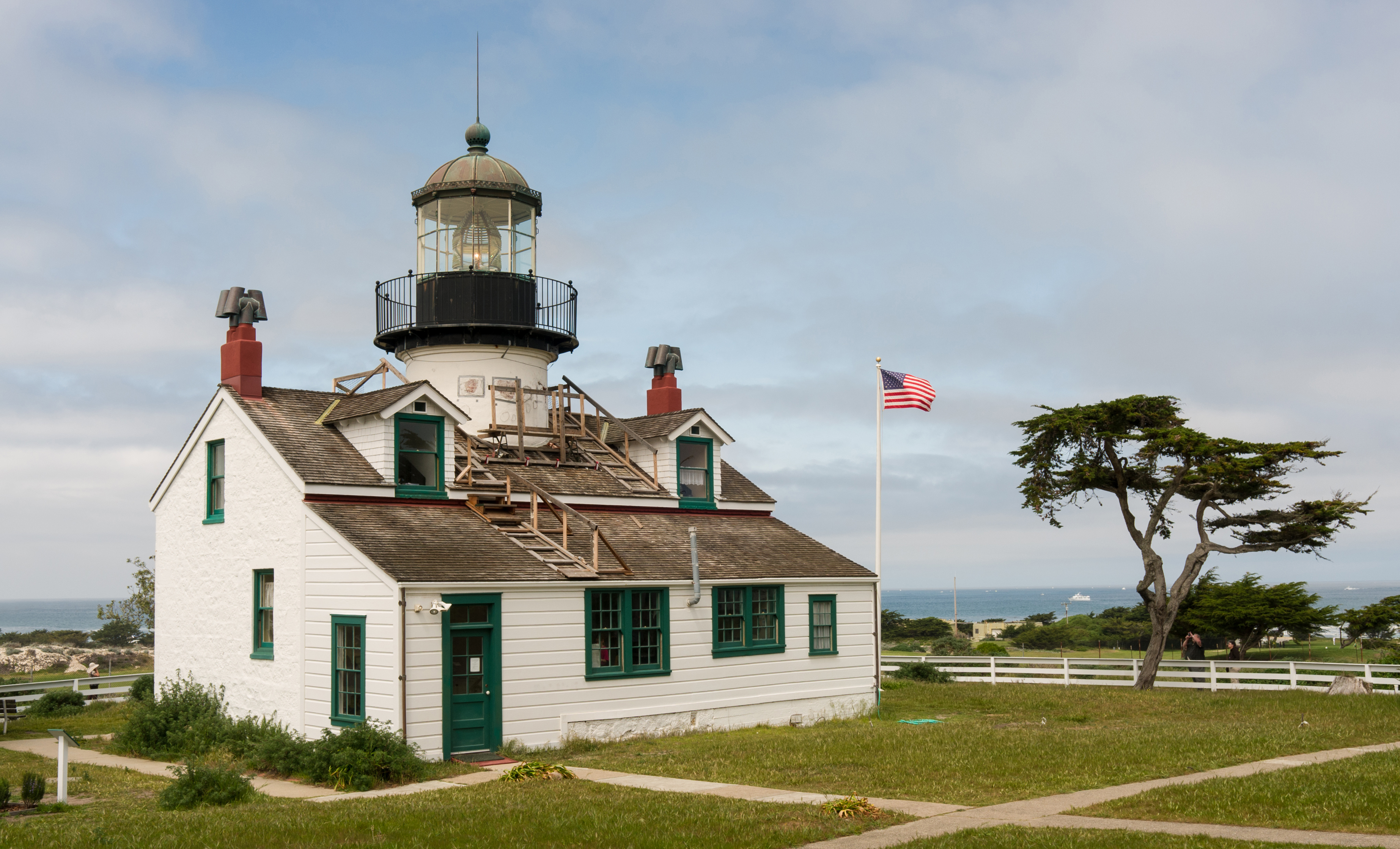
- Point Pinos Lighthouse in Pacific Grove, California
- Location: Monterey Bay; Pacific Grove, California; United States
- Coordinates: 36.633389°N 121.933783°W

Tower
- Constructed: 1855
- Foundation: stone basement
- Construction: concrete tower
- Automated: 1975
- Height: 43 feet (13 m)
- Shape: cylindrical tower with balcony and lantern rising at the centre of keeper's house
- Markings: white tower, black lantern
- Operator: Point Pinos Lighthouse
- Heritage: National Register of Historic Places listed place

Light
- Focal height: 89 feet (27 m)
- Lens: Third order Fresnel lens
- Range: 17 nmi (31 km; 20 mi)
- Characteristic: Oc. W 4s.
- Point Pinos Lighthouse
- U.S. National Register of Historic Places
- Location: Asilomar Blvd. and Lighthouse Ave., Pacific Grove, California
- Area: 1.3 acres (0.53 ha)
- Architectural style: Cape Cod style lighthouse
- NRHP reference No.: 77000312
- Added to NRHP: July 14, 1977

Point Pinos Lighthouse is an operational lighthouse located in Monterey Bay, Pacific Grove, California, United States. Originally lit on February 1, 1855, it remains an active United States Coast Guard aid to navigation, and is the oldest continuously operating lighthouse on the West Coast of the United States. Automated in 1975, Port Pinos retains its original third order Fresnel lens, but is surrounded today by the Pacific Grove Municipal Golf Links. On-site museum exhibits and other lighthouse related functions are operated by the city of Pacific Grove, Monterey County.

== Description ==
The present light source is a 200 Watt LED bulb. Located 89 feet (27 m) above sea level, the signal is visible under favorable conditions up to 15 nautical miles; 27 kilometres (17 mi) distant. Formerly, the light had a rigid schedule of being lit one hour prior to sunset, and extinguished one hour after sunrise. With automation completed in 1975, a small battery-operated back-up strobe light was installed outside the tower, and the main light was turned on permanently. The present signal has a simple 4-second cycle signature of on/3-seconds, and off/1-second. As a further navigational aid, a Class D radio beacon operated continuously which had a range of up to 20 miles (30 km). A foghorn was also located below the lighthouse closer to shore which could be turned on manually by Coast Guard personnel. With the advent of global positioning satellite (GPS) navigation in 1993, the radio beacon and foghorn were deactivated.

== History ==
The Port Pinos Lighthouse was lit on February 1, 1855. The light is a third-order Fresnel lens, with lenses, prisms and mechanism manufactured in France in 1853. A larger, second-order light had been planned, but delay in shipment caused the present light, originally destined for the Fort Point Lighthouse in San Francisco, to be installed instead. Alcatraz Island Lighthouse in San Francisco Bay preceded Point Pinos by eight months, but was replaced in 1909 by the expanding military prison.

The first Point Pinos light source was a whale oil lantern set inside the lens, whose tank the keeper had to climb the tower to fill several times a night. Whale oil was very expensive and was soon replaced by liquified lard oil, which gave way to kerosene in 1880. At the turn of the century, an incandescent vapor lamp was used, followed by electric lights in 1919. From 1912 to 1940 a falling weight mechanism rotated a metal shutter around the light, causing the beam to be cut off to seaward for 10 out of every 30 seconds. It was replaced by a timed "on/off" switch.

In 1874 Lighthouse Avenue in Pacific Grove, named for the Point Pinos Lighthouse, was laid out to ferry supplies and construction materials from the port at Monterey to the lighthouse.

The point was a part of the 2,667-acre (1,079 ha) Rancho Punta de Pinos Mexican land grant made to José María Armenta in 1833, and regranted to José Abrego in 1844. In 1850, after the Mexican–American War and the American acquisition of Alta California, Congress appropriated funds for the construction of lighthouses on the West Coast. In 1852, the Secretary of the Treasury ordered the building of seven beacons along the California coast, one of which was to be located at Point Pinos, the dangerous southern entrance to Monterey Bay. The government purchased 25 acres (10 ha) of the Rancho Punta de los Pinos for this purpose, with an additional 67 acres (27 ha) being purchased later on. Construction began in 1853, but difficulties with the delivery of the lenses and prisms from France delayed the opening of the lighthouse until 1855.

The first lightkeeper was Charles Layton, appointed to the post at $1,000 per year. He was killed in 1855 while serving as a member of the sheriff's posse chasing the notorious outlaw, Anastacio Garcia. He was succeeded by his widow, Charlotte, who remained head lightkeeper until 1860, when she married her assistant, George Harris. Robert Louis Stevenson wrote of visiting lightkeeper Allen Luce in 1879 after a long walk through the woods from Monterey, praising Luce's hospitality, piano playing, ship models and oil paintings. He wrote about the light in his book From Scotland to Silverado.

The most famous lightkeeper was Mrs. Emily Fish, who served from 1893 to 1914. She was called the "Socialite Keeper" due to her love of entertaining guests at the lighthouse.

Point Pinos Lighthouse is on the National Register of Historic Places.

== Image gallery ==
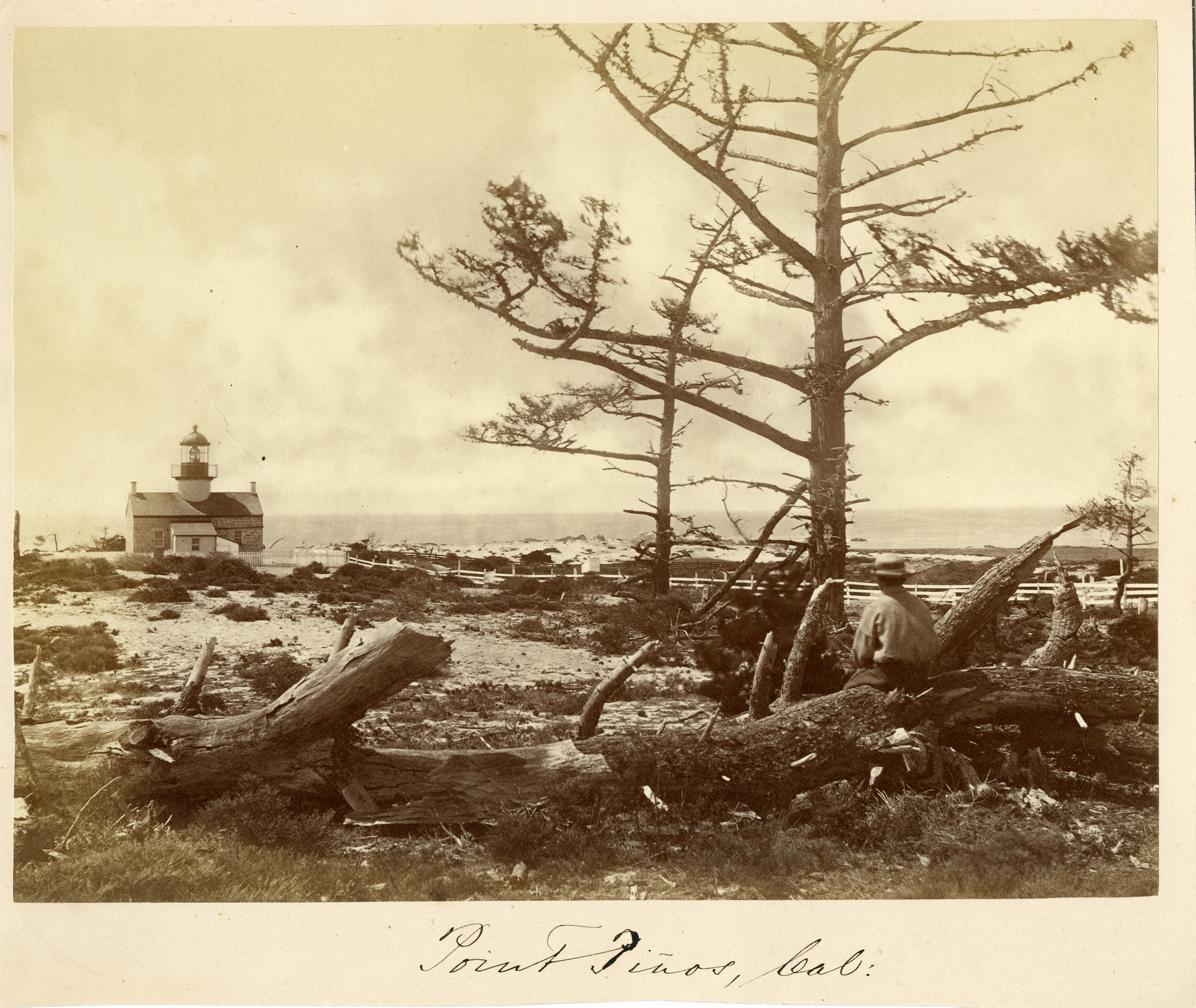
Point Pinos lighthouse in 1871

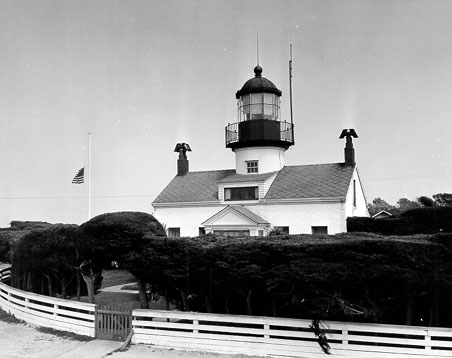
Undated USCG photo

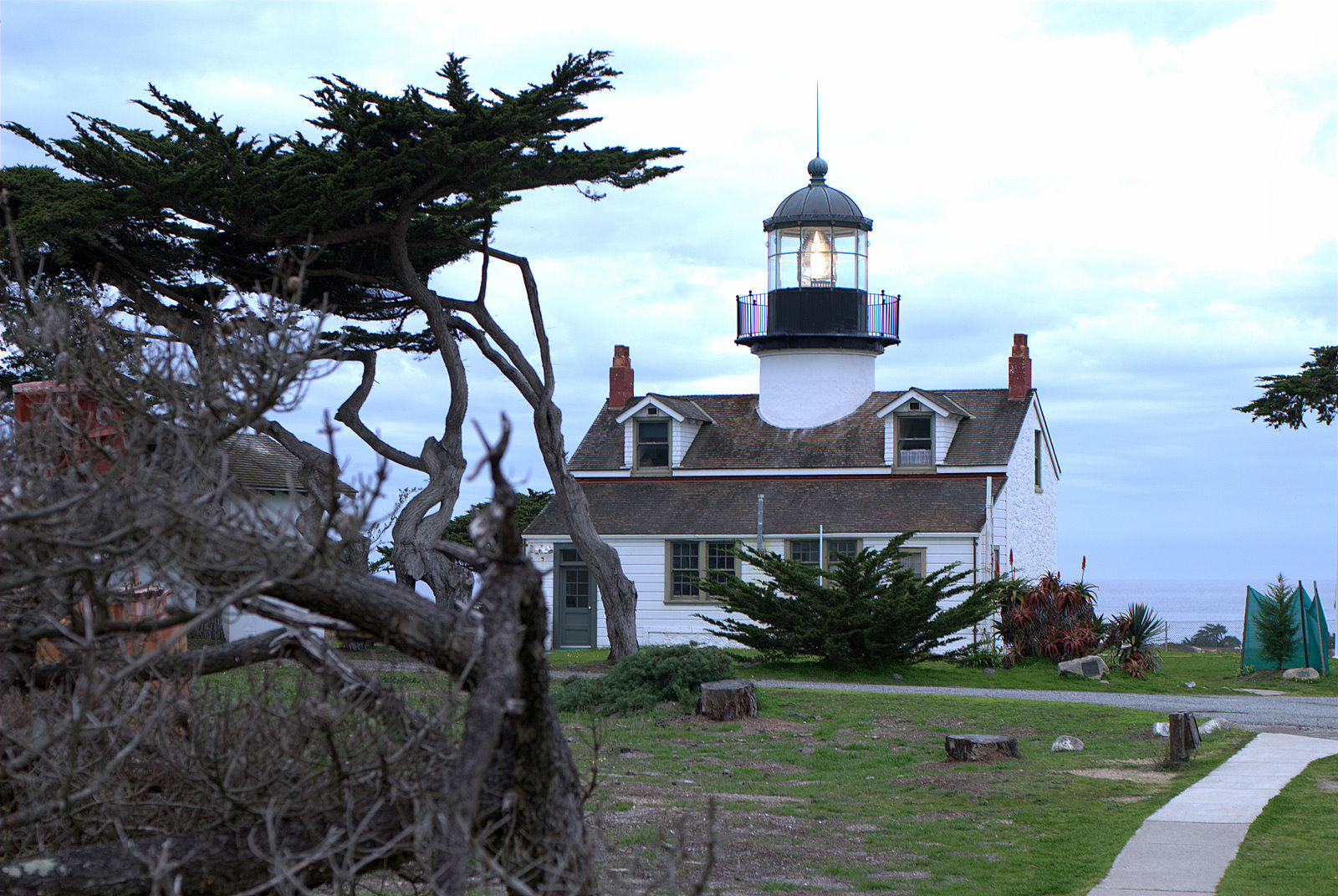
Lighthouse showing Fresnel lens in lantern house.

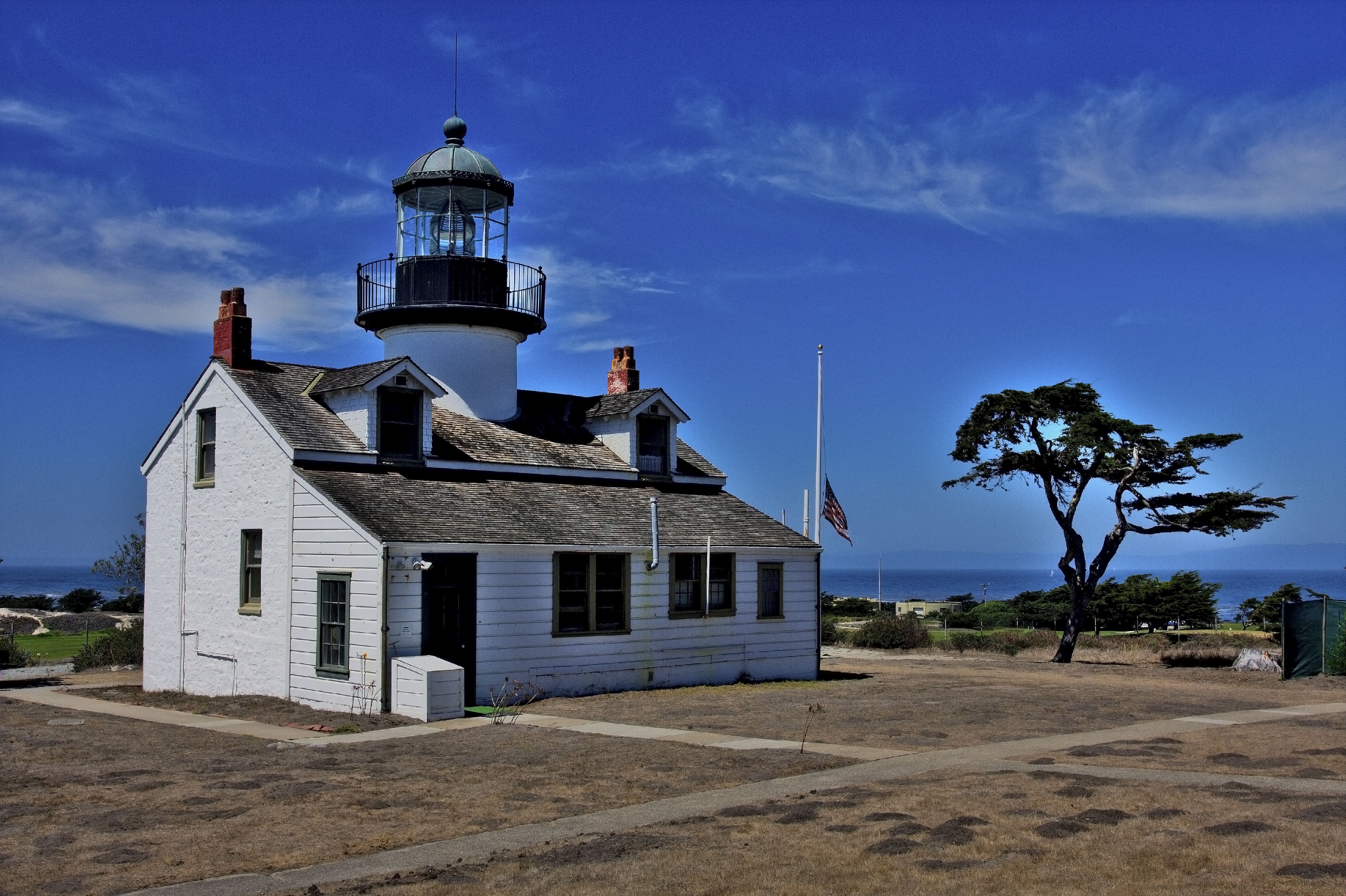
The lighthouse in 2009.

== See also ==
- List of lighthouses in California
