= Desdemona Sands Light =

Lighthouse in Oregon, U.S.

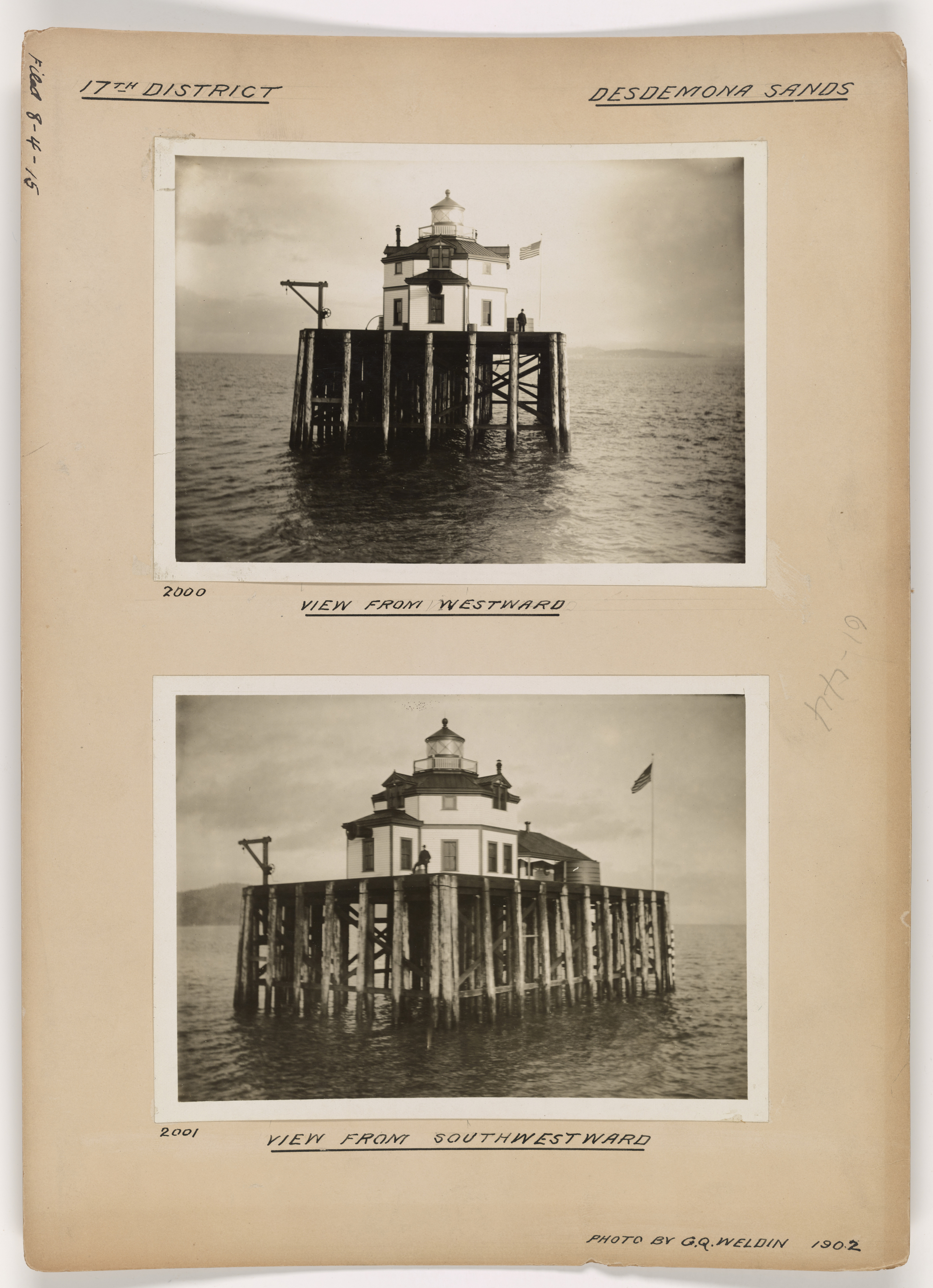
- Location: Columbia Bar, Oregon, U.S.
- Coordinates: 46.22528°N 123.95361°W

Tower
- Constructed: 1901
- Foundation: cluster of piles
- Construction: Two-story
- Automated: 1934
- Height: 48-foot (15 m)
- Shape: octagonal

Light
- First lit: 1901 or 1902
- Deactivated: 1965
- Focal height: 7 m (23 ft)
- Lens: Fourth order Fresnel lens
- Range: 12 miles (19 km)
- Characteristic: Fixed white Daboll trumpet 2s with silence 3s and 23s

Desdemona Sands Light was a lighthouse located on the Pacific coast of the U.S. state of Oregon, at the mouth of the Columbia River to aid navigation of the Columbia Bar.

It was built in 1901 or 1902 as a replacement for Point Adams Light. The Lightship Columbia kept station about 5 miles (8.0 km) offshore.

Its design by Carl Leick is identical to that of Semiahmoo Harbor Light near Blaine, Washington, a 1 1/2-story dwelling built on a cluster of pilings in 12 feet (3.7 m) of water with a rooftop tower housing the light and a fog signal. It was one of the last U.S. wooden pile foundation lighthouses built. A cistern system collected fresh water. Only the lightkeeper was present; there was a small boat to reach the mainland, where the keeper's family lived.

The light was electrified in 1934, eliminating the need for a keeper. It was removed and replaced after World War II by a minor aid on top of a pyramidal structure, which was replaced again in 1955. The light was removed in 1965.

Desdemona Sands is a group of shoals formerly named Chinook Sands. In 1857, the bark Desdemona ran aground here and was destroyed.

== See also ==
- List of lighthouses on the Oregon Coast
