= List of lighthouses in Oregon =

This is a list of current and former lighthouses in Oregon.

Name	Image	Location	Coordinates	Year first lit	Automated	Year deactivated	Current Lens	Height
Cape Arago Light		Coos Bay	43.34123°N 124.37543°W	1866 (First); 1934 (Current)	1966	2006 (Now tribal land)	None	44 ft (13 m)
Cape Blanco Light		Port Orford	42.8365897°N 124.5633023°W	1870	1980	Active	Second-order Fresnel	59 ft (18 m)
Cape Meares Light		Oceanside (Cape Meares)	45.486556°N 123.978389°W	1890	Never (Replaced in 1963)	1963 (Replacement light deactivated in 2014.)	First-order Fresnel	38 ft (12 m)
Cleft of the Rock Light		Yachats	44.290479°N 124.110773°W	1976	Always	Active	Fourth-order Fresnel	34 ft (10 m)
Coquille River Light		Bandon	43.123911°N 124.424222°W	1896	Never (Relit in 1991)	1939	Decorative	40 ft (12 m)
Desdemona Sands Light		Astoria	46.22528°N 123.95361°W	1901	1934	1965 (Demolished)	None	48 ft (15 m)
Heceta Head Light		Florence	44.13737°N 124.127835°W	1894	1963	Active	First-order Fresnel	56 ft (17 m)
Pelican Bay Light (aka: Port of Brookings Light		Brookings	42.04175°N 124.26279°W	1997 (Private light)	Always	Active	Unknown	35 ft (11 m)
Point Adams Light		Astoria	46.188333°N 123.977778°W	1875	Always	1899 (Demolished in 1912)	None	49 ft (15 m)
Tillamook Rock Light		Seaside (Tillamook Head)	45.9375°N 124.019°W	1881	Never	1957	None	62 ft (19 m)
Umpqua River Light		Winchester Bay	43.662291°N 124.198476°W	1857 (First); 1894 (Current)	1966	Active	First-order Fresnel	61 ft (19 m)
Warrior Rock Light		Sauvie Island	45.84858°N 122.78835°W	1877 (First); 1970s (Current)	1930	Active	Unknown	25 ft (7.6 m)
Willamette River Light		Portland	45.65301°N 122.76300°W	1895	1935	1950s (Burned down)	None	Unknown
Yaquina Bay Light		Newport	44.62415°N 124.06290°W	1871	1996 (Relit)	Active (Inactive: 1874–1996)	250mm	51 ft (16 m)
Yaquina Head Light		Newport	44.676778°N 124.079417°W	1873	1966	Active	First-order Fresnel	93 ft (28 m)

== See also ==
- Lists of Oregon-related topics
