= Pelican Bay Light =

- Location: Brookings, Oregon
- Coordinates: 42.04175°N 124.26279°W

Tower
- Constructed: 1997
- Foundation: Natural/emplaced
- Construction: Wood
- Height: 35 feet (11 m)
- Shape: Octagonal

Light
- First lit: 1997
- Focal height: 43 m (141 ft)
- Lens: Fixed Acrylic Fresnel lens
- Range: 11 nautical miles (20 km; 13 mi)
- Characteristic: 3 flashes in 19.5 seconds, (1.5 seconds on, 2.5 off, 1.5 on, 2.5 off, 1.5 on, 10 off)

The Pelican Bay Light (or Port of Brookings Light) is a small, privately owned lighthouse in Brookings, Oregon, United States. It overlooks the Port of Brookings Harbor and the mouth of the Chetco River. Built as an addition to an existing house, Pelican Bay Light is maintained by the Cady family of Brookings.

== See also ==
- List of lighthouses on the Oregon Coast
