= Point Arguello Light =

Lighthouse in California, United States

- View from train August 29, 2010
- Location: Point Arguello; Santa Barbara Channel; California; United States
- Coordinates: 34°34′37.4″N 120°38′49.9″W

Tower
- Constructed: 1901 (first); 1934 (second)
- Foundation: concrete base
- Construction: wooden tower (first) metal skeletal tower (second) post light (current)
- Automated: 1967
- Height: 20 feet (6.1 m)
- Shape: square tower with balcony and lantern (first) pyramidal tower with balcony and lantern (second)
- Power source: solar power
- Operator: Vanderberg Air Force Base
- Fog signal: 2 blasts every 20s. continuously

Light
- First lit: 1967 (current)
- Focal height: 124 feet (38 m)
- Lens: Fourth order Fresnel lens (original), aerobeacon (current)
- Range: 9 nautical miles (17 km; 10 mi)
- Characteristic: Fl W 15s.

Point Arguello Lighthouse is a lighthouse on Point Arguello in Santa Barbara County, California, serving the Santa Barbara Channel on the Gaviota Coast adjoining Vandenberg Space Force Base near the city of Lompoc, California.

The original Point Arguello lighthouse, built in 1901, had a white square tower attached to a one-story keeper's house. It had a fourth order Fresnel lens, which was transferred from the Point Hueneme Lighthouse. The tower was replaced in 1934 by a square pyramidal skeletal steel tower, which was in turn replaced by the current post light.

== History ==
=== Point Arguello ===
The area of land now known as Point Arguello was originally known by the 'Chumashan—Canalino Indian' name "Nocto" and was part of the territory ruled by Chief Salipuata at the time of the occupation by the Spanish missionaries. The Native Americans were part of the third indigenous people in the area, the Canalino branch of the Chumash people. In Paleo-indian times, a people of Mongolian heritage first settled along the Southern California coast in areas where oak trees were plentiful, from which characteristic they have been named "The Oak Tree (Grove) People". They vanished some hundreds of years B.C.E., and after a period without archaeological evidence, a second semi—nomadic group arrived. These "hunting people" gradually merged with a third group, the Chumash people, as they settled here.

On August 28, 1769, the Portola expedition camped near Point Arguello, where they found a small Chumash rancheria. This area had many excellent flints, and so they named it Los Pedernales, The Flints. This name continued to be used for the point on Spanish maps until Mexican Independence in 1821. The American and non-Spanish European designation was Point Arguello, from the name given by George Vancouver in 1793, in honor of José Darío Argüello, then Commandant of the Presidio of Monterey.

=== Lighthouse ===
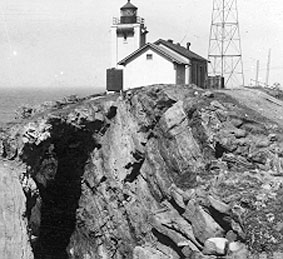
The original Point Arguello tower – U.S. Coast Guard Archive

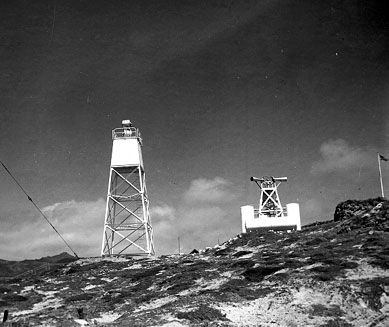
The skeletal Point Arguello tower – U.S. Coast Guard Archive

In 1901, the lighthouse service built the first light station at Point Arguello. Due to erosion, The tower was replaced in 1911 with a standalone tower. Between 1934 and 1938, increased coastal shipping necessitated the service establish a lifeboat station. In 1934, the tower was razed and replaced with a skeleton tower.

On July 1, 1939, the Lighthouse Service was combined with the Coast Guard to augment the Service by 8,000 men who took their place in forming a nucleus for our present day light stations and aids to navigation work. During the interim of World War II, the Coast Guard manned Point Arguello Light and Point Arguello Lifeboat station, as well as a newly established LORAN Station. After 12 years-operation following the War, it was deemed economical to disestablish the lifeboat station and so in 1958, Point Arguello Lifeboat Station was retired.

Point Arguello had, until 1967, an allowance of 12 enlisted personnel and accommodations for eight families.

=== Shipwrecks ===
The history of Point Arguello has been one of shipwrecks, the area having been termed the "Graveyard of the Pacific"; probably the most famous tragedy was the wreck of the "Yankee Blade" on October 1, 1854. When the steamship hit the rocks 200 to 300 yards (180 to 270 m) offshore 415 people perished. She carried a fortune in gold bullion which has since been recovered.

In 1911, the Santa Rosa ran aground at Saddle Rock, just north of the lighthouse after the Third Officer mistook railroad construction lights for the lighthouse.

In 1923 what has been called the U.S. Navy's greatest peacetime disaster, the Honda Point Disaster, occurred off the Point when seven 4—stacker destroyers mistook Point Arguello for Point Conception and sank, with 22 sailors lost. Mariners say that the chief reason that so many boats have struck there is that in bad weather typical of that shoreline, sailing a boat into the channel between San Miguel Island and Points Arguello and Conception is like sailing into the eye of a needle.

=== Rockets history ===
Point Arguello also boasts one of the few space launch facilities in North America, at Vandenberg Space Force Base where many other rocket launch sites have been built since the start of the Space Age.

== Light operation ==
The Point Arguello Light is a reporting point for the National Weather Service. The weather station disseminates information upon which conditions for the western portion of the Santa Barbara Channel are based. Facilities at the light include a 36-inch (910 mm) revolving beacon of 1,100,000 candle power that can be seen approximately 17 miles (15 nmi; 27 km) at sea. The light itself is 124 feet (38 m) above the water. A two-tone diaphone fog signal is placed in operation when visibility is less than 5 miles (8.0 km). The diaphone when operating is synchronized with a radio beacon every three minutes for distance finding.

== Head keepers ==
- William A. Beeman (1900 – 1908)
- William A. Henderson (1908 – at least 1913)
- George A. Hussey (at least 1915)
- Gottfrid Theodor Olson (at least 1917 – at least 1930)
- John O. Lunden (at least 1940 – 1941)
- Leo Y. Kellogg (1941 – at least 1948)

== See also ==
- List of lighthouses in the United States
