= Hereford Inlet Lighthouse =

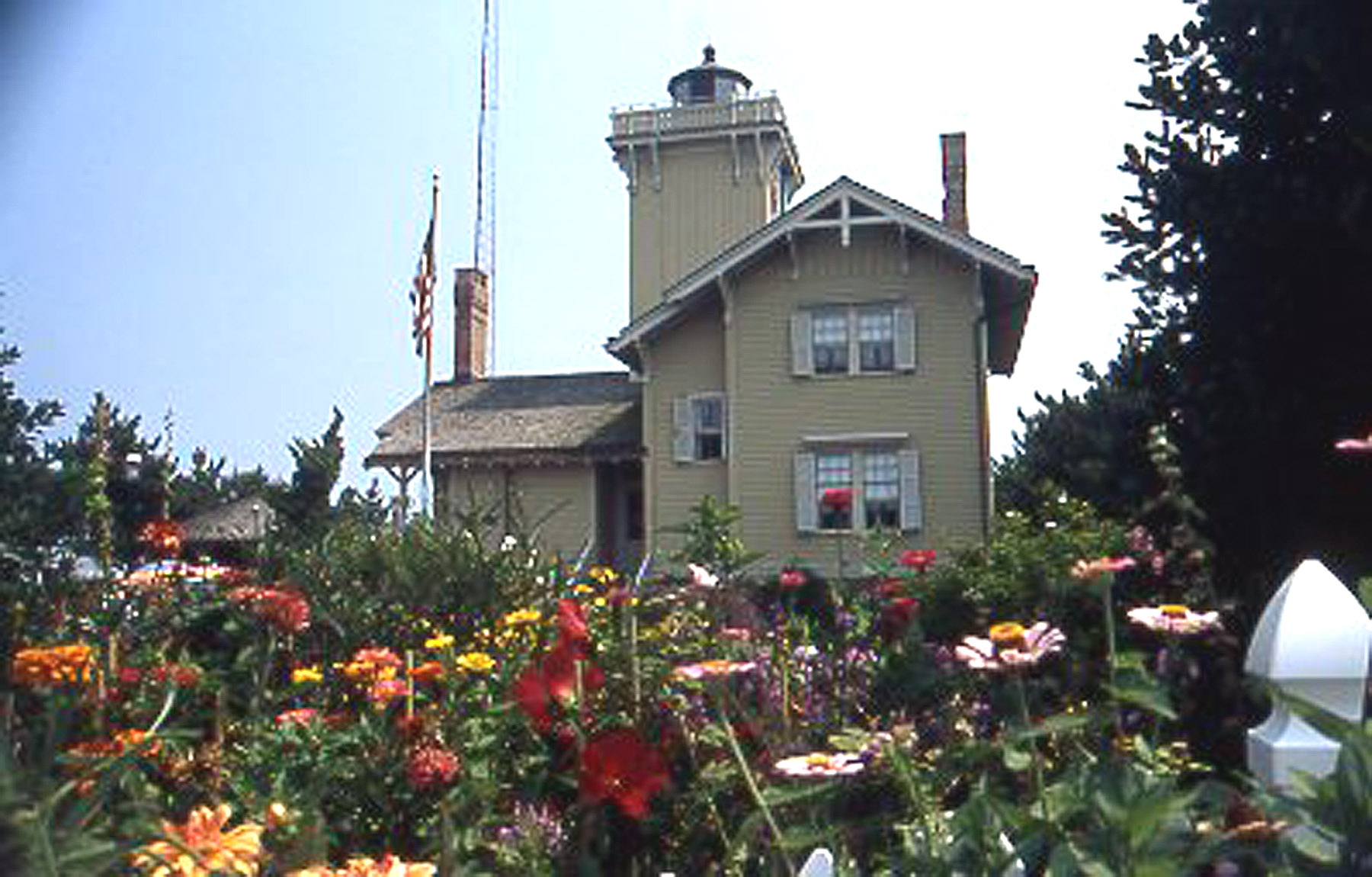
- Location: North Wildwood, New Jersey
- Coordinates: 39°0′24″N 74°47′32″W

Tower
- Constructed: 1874
- Foundation: Wood pilings
- Construction: Wood
- Automated: 1964
- Height: 57 feet (17 m)
- Shape: Square
- Heritage: National Register of Historic Places listed place

Light
- First lit: 1874
- Focal height: 17 m (56 ft)
- Lens: Fourth-order Fresnel lens
- Range: 13 nautical miles (24 km; 15 mi)
- Characteristic: White light flashing every 10 sec
- Hereford Lighthouse
- U.S. National Register of Historic Places
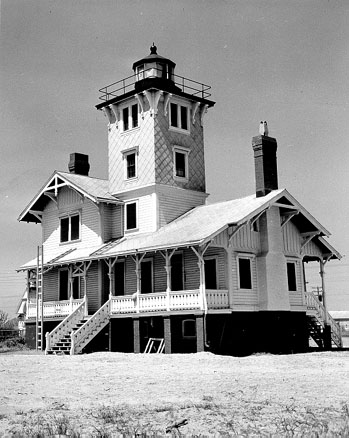
- Undated United States Coast Guard photograph
- Location: First and Central Aves., North Wildwood, New Jersey
- Area: 1 acre (0.40 ha)
- Architect: Paul J. Pelz
- Architectural style: Stick/Eastlake
- NRHP reference No.: 77000859
- Added to NRHP: September 20, 1977

The Hereford Inlet Lighthouse is a historic lighthouse located in North Wildwood, New Jersey, situated on the southern shore of Hereford Inlet at the north end of Five Mile Beach. Its construction was completed and it became operational in 1874.

The 50-foot (15 m) tower and its beacon are visible for up to 13 nautical miles (24 km; 15 mi).

== History ==
Hereford Inlet, a break in the barrier islands along the eastern side of Cape May, was first used by whalers in the 17th century. Though the area was frequented, environmental conditions such as shifting sandbars and strong currents created reason for concern and in 1849, a life-saving station was built along the inlet. With shipwrecks on the rise throughout America, the United States Life Saving Service was founded 22 years later and a larger Life-Saving Station replaced the existing one. After being on Hereford Inlet for only one year, the United States Life Saving Service recognized the need for a lighthouse and included in its annual report that, "A small light, say a fourth order, is respectfully recommended for this place, as it would be of importance to the coal trade and to steamers navigating the Delaware Bay and River, and to mark the entrance to the inlet, where there is a good harbor of refuge for small coasting vessels." Finally, on June 10, 1872, Congress acted to fund the erection of a fourth-order light along the New Jersey shoreline. On July 7, 1873, Humphrey S. Cresse sold the 1.5-acre (0.61 ha) site to the U.S. government for $150. The lighthouse was designed by Paul J. Pelz, who also designed Hereford Inlet's sister stations, Point Fermin Light in San Pedro, California; East Brother Island Light in Richmond, California; Mare Island Light (demolished in the 1930s) in Carquinez Strait, California; Point Hueneme Light (replaced in 1940) in California, and Point Adams Light (burned down by the Lighthouse Service in 1912) in Washington state, all in essentially the same style. The United States Army Corps of Engineers undertook construction of the lighthouse on November 8, 1873, on a design by Pelz, and completed it on March 30, 1874. A "Notice to Mariners" issued May 11, 1874, announced the operation of the light on the north end of Five Mile Beach.

Hereford Inlet Lighthouse withstood many potential dangers. One of the noted environmental dangers included a storm that hit September 8–12, 1889. According to Mid-Atlantic Hurricanes the storm "occurred when [a hurricane] stalled off the coast … producing erosive, enveloping surf and covering part or all of many barrier islands." Many residents of historic Anglesea fled to the lighthouse for shelter. A more severe storm in August 1913 brought the water dangerously close to the lighthouse, damaging the foundation and threatening the structure. The lighthouse was temporarily closed and the structure was moved 150 feet (46 m) west. It reopened in 1914. A fire later threatened the structure in 1938 while the current keeper, Ferdinand Heinzman, was painting the structure. According to Lighthouse Friends, "A coastguardsman … noticed thick smoke emanating from one of the upstairs windows, called the fire department, and then alerted the occupants of the imminent danger." Heinzman attempted to extinguish the fire but was deterred by the fire. "Undaunted, he procured a ladder and equipped with a garden hose, he climbed to the second story and fought the fire through a window… and saved the lighthouse … An investigation determined that spontaneous combustion had started the fire."

The light was decommissioned in 1964 when the United States Coast Guard constructed an automated skeletal light tower. It is disputed as to when the lighthouse and adjoining Life-Saving Station were turned over to the New Jersey State Police's Marine Services Unit. It is argued that the transfer occurred in 1963, just before the tower was constructed, other say that it occurred when the buildings were no longer needed. The Life Saving Station remains used by the New Jersey State Police today, however, the lighthouse was boarded up and left unused until 1982 when locals petitioned to take over the building. In 1986, the light (DCB-24) was transferred from the skeletal tower into the lighthouse. The grounds were taken over by North Wildwood's superintendent of parks, Steve Murray. At the time of the lighthouse's closure, it had been painted white with red trim and blue shutters; in 2003, it was restored to its historically accurate buff color. The current VRB-25 beacon was installed on July 19, 2018. As an active aid to navigation, the beacon in the lighthouse tower continues to be maintained by the United States Coast Guard.

Today, Hereford Inlet Lighthouse operates as a fully operating lighthouse and museum. It operates under the City of North Wildwood and the city's North Wildwood Historical Commission. The lighthouse is listed on both the National and State Registers of Historic Places as of 1977 and it is part of the New Jersey Coastal Heritage Trail. It is operated and maintained with money generated through donations and Lighthouse fundraising projects.

== Keepers ==
John Marche served as the first lighthouse keeper for less than three months before drowning when his rowboat overturned on returning from the mainland. The next keeper, Freeling "Captain" Hewitt, an American Civil War veteran, served that position for the longest time, 45 years.

== See also ==
- List of museums in New Jersey
- National Register of Historic Places listings in Cape May County, New Jersey
