= Emily Fish =

American lighthouse keeper (1843–1931)

Emily Augusta Fish (née Maitland; February 22, 1843 – June 24, 1931), sometimes called the "socialite keeper", was an American lighthouse keeper. A native of Albion, Michigan, she married Melancthon W. Fish, her sister's widower, at the age of 17. Melancthon, a medical doctor, served in a number of government posts overseas before returning to fight for the Union in the American Civil War. He died in 1891, when Emily was 50.

Soon after her husband's death Fish's son-in-law, an official with the United States Lighthouse Service, informed her of a vacancy at the Point Pinos Light in California. With his help, Fish applied for, and won, the position, moving into the station with her Chinese servant, Lew Kew "Que", and luxurious furnishings.

During her 21 years as keeper, from 1893 to 1914, Fish brought rich soil to the lighthouse grounds, and planted grass, hedges, and trees; she also kept French poodles, Holstein cows, thoroughbred horses, and chickens. She became well regarded in the area for her entertaining ability, and always received the highest marks for keeping the station tidy. She co-founded the Monterey-Pacific Grove Chapter of the America Red Cross and chaired the Ladies Welcoming Committee. Her lighthouse log shows that she hired more than 30 men over the course of 21 years and that "most of them were discharged due to incompetence."

Fish's niece Juliet Nichols, whom Fish reared, also became a lighthouse keeper.

In later life Fish was awarded the Star of Efficiency medal of the US Lighthouse Service, retired in 1914, and died in 1931. Fish is buried with Nichols in the Mountain View Cemetery in Oakland.
