= Long Beach Shoreline Marina =

Marina in Long Beach, California

Coordinates: 33.757882°N 118.183782°W

The Long Beach Shoreline Marina is a marina based in Long Beach, California.

== History ==
The marina was built in 1983 to host the competitions in Sailing at the 1984 Summer Olympics. The marina used the five gangways of this shoreline. The 1984 Summer Olympics were based in neighboring Los Angeles.

It is located near the Long Beach Convention and Entertainment Center, which hosted the competitions in Fencing at the 1984 Summer Olympics and Volleyball at the 1984 Summer Olympics.

Beneath the flagpole at Shoreline Park are the names of 74 Navy sailors who boarded the USS Frank E. Evans in Long Beach and perished in the Melbourne–Evans collision.

== Gallery ==
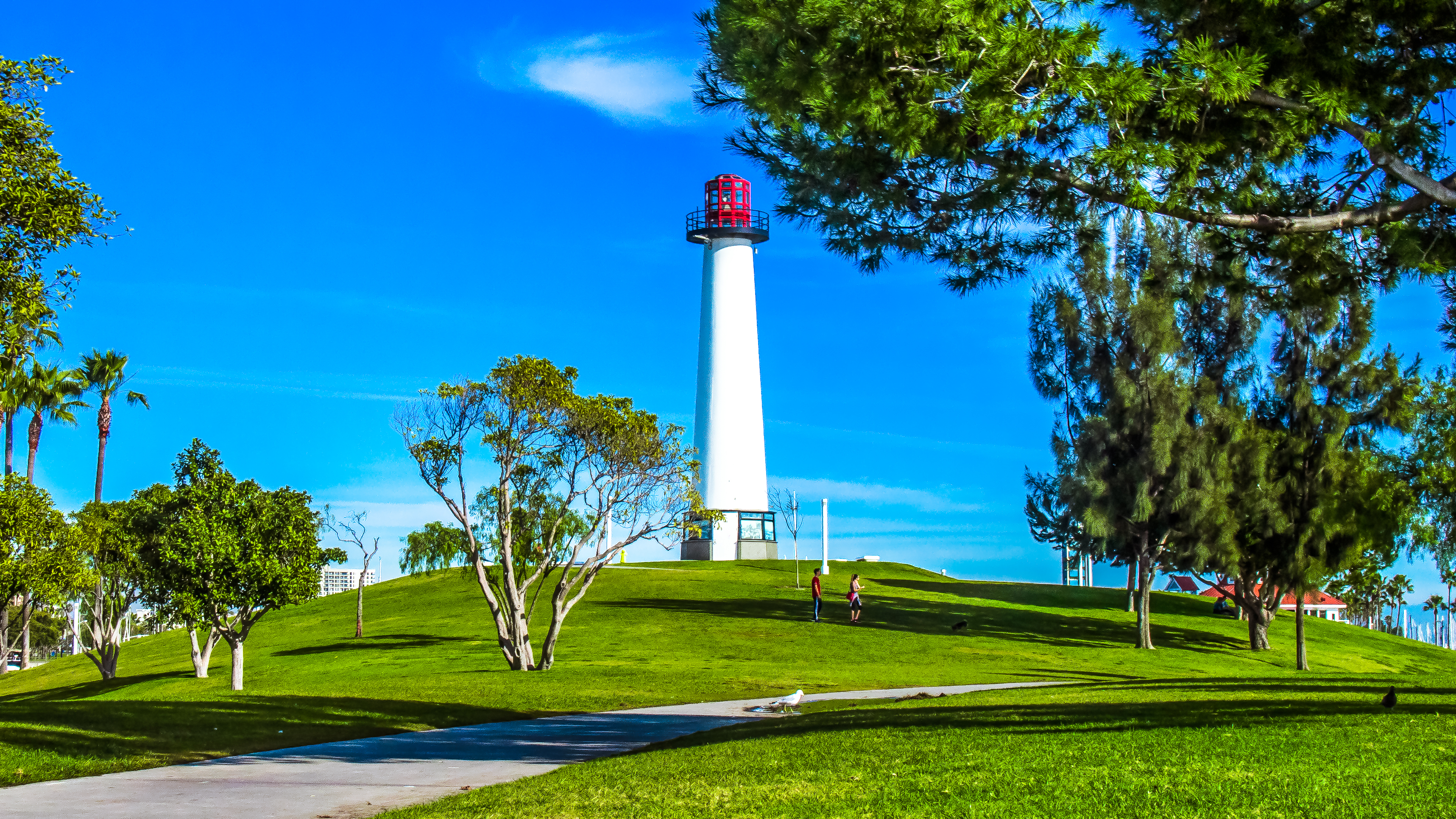
Lions Lighthouse, completed in 2000 by the Downtown Lions Club

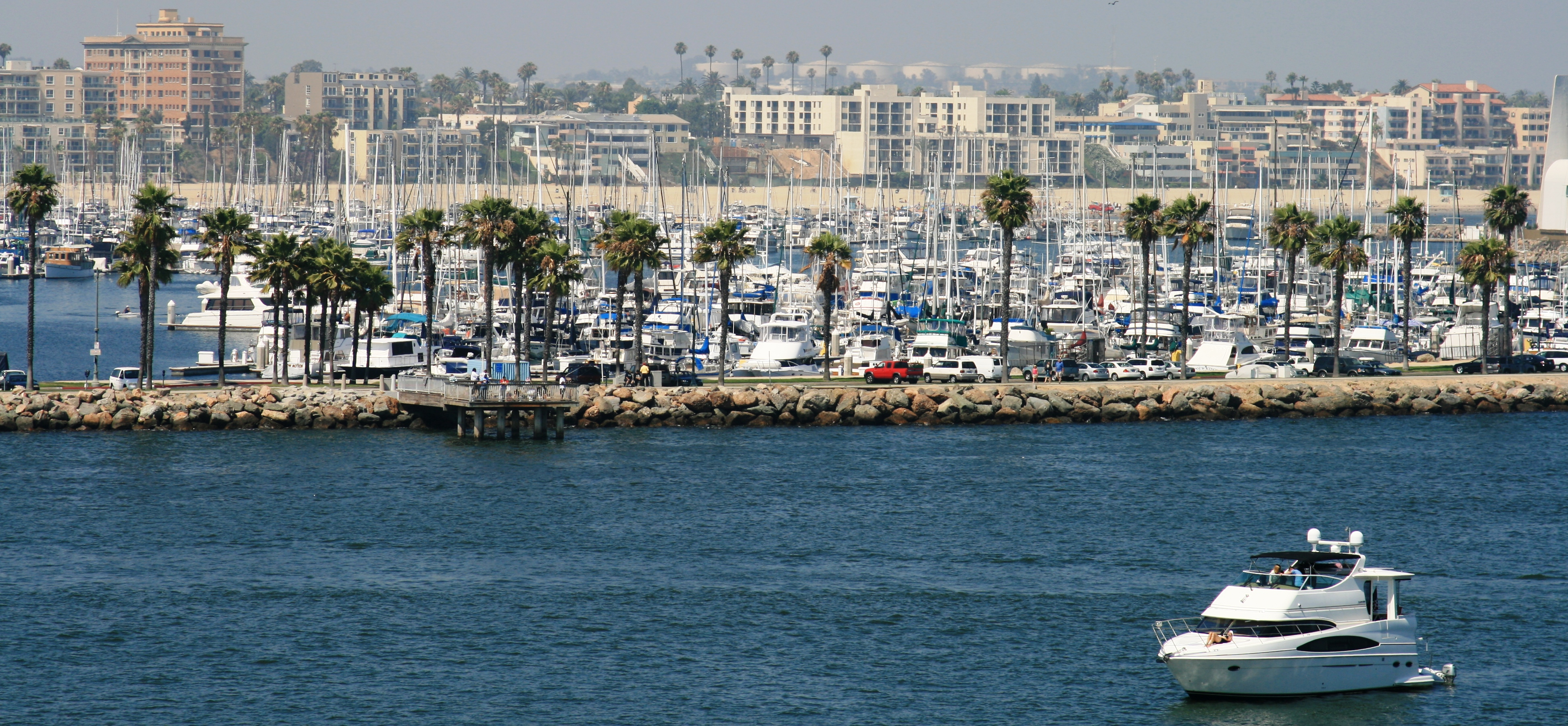
Long Beach Shoreline Marina

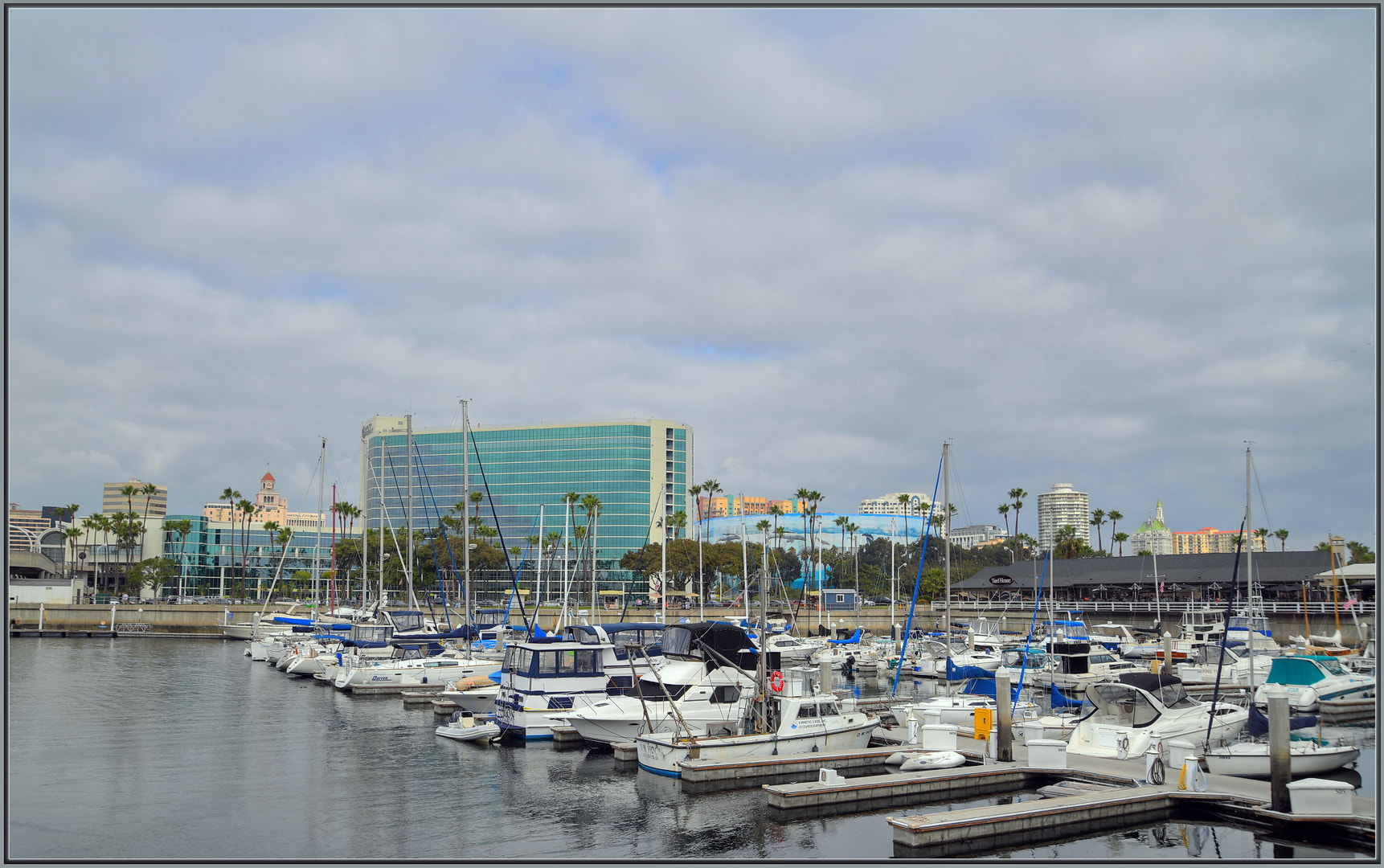
Rainbow Harbor

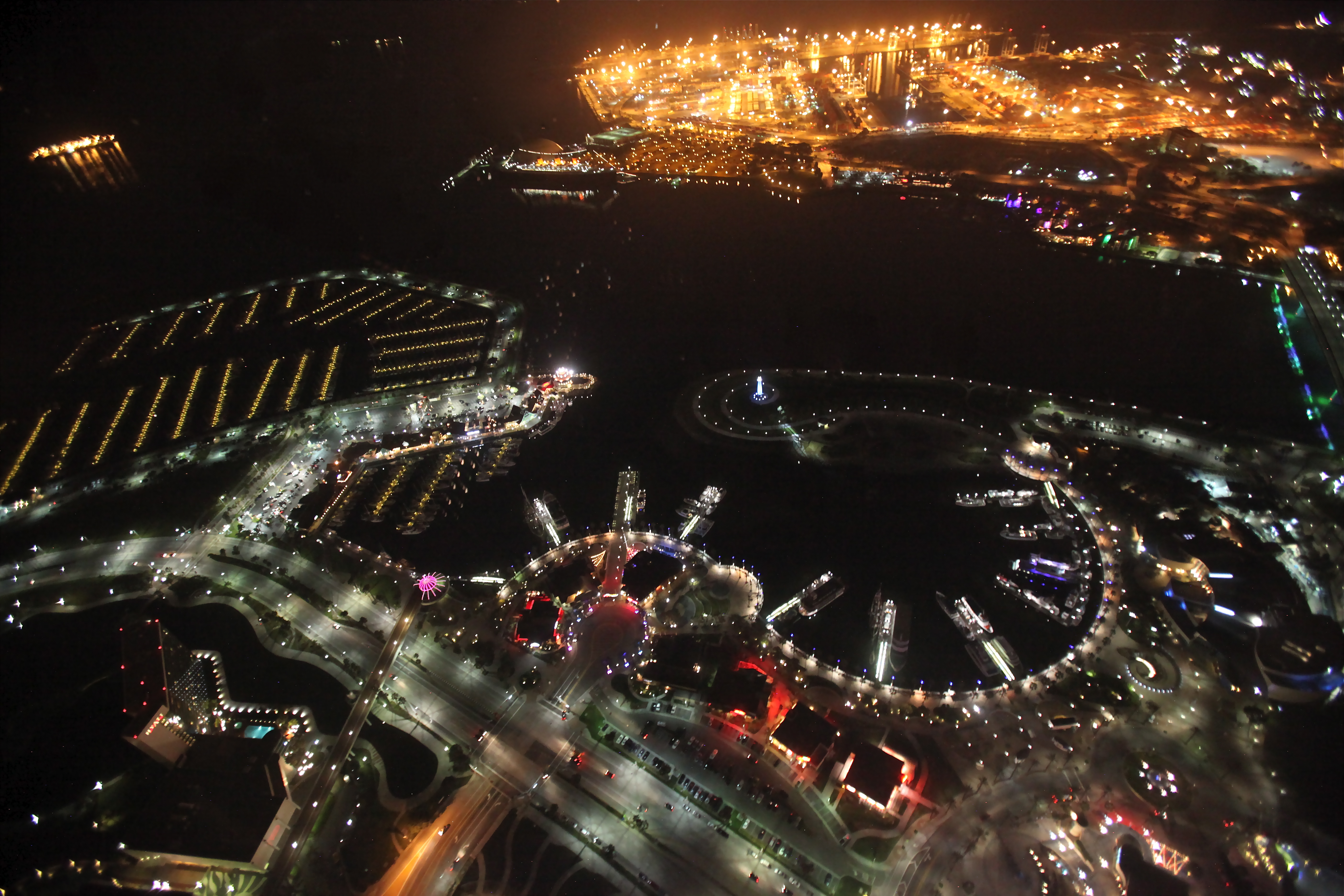
Shoreline Marina at night

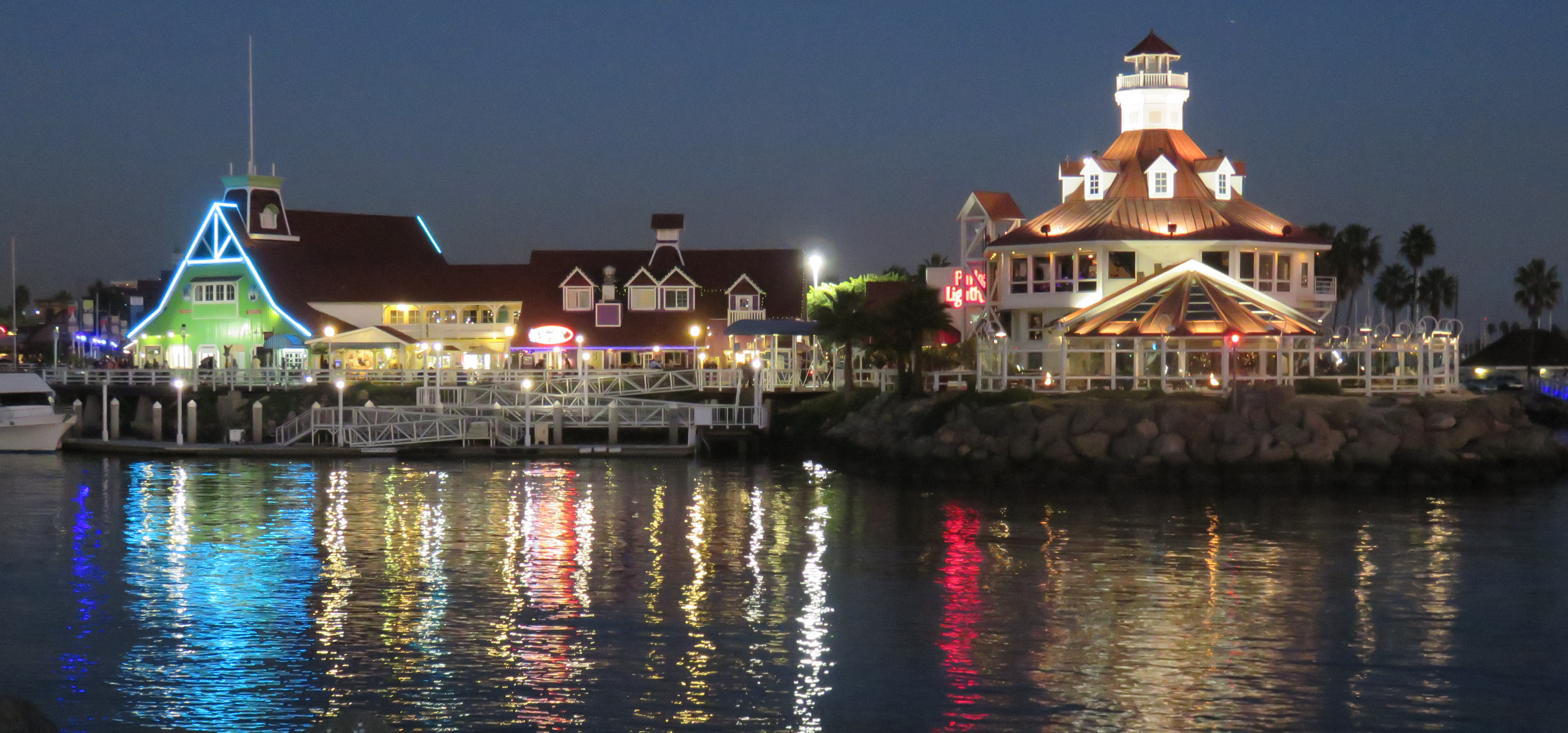
Shoreline Village shopping center
