= Semiahmoo Harbor Light =

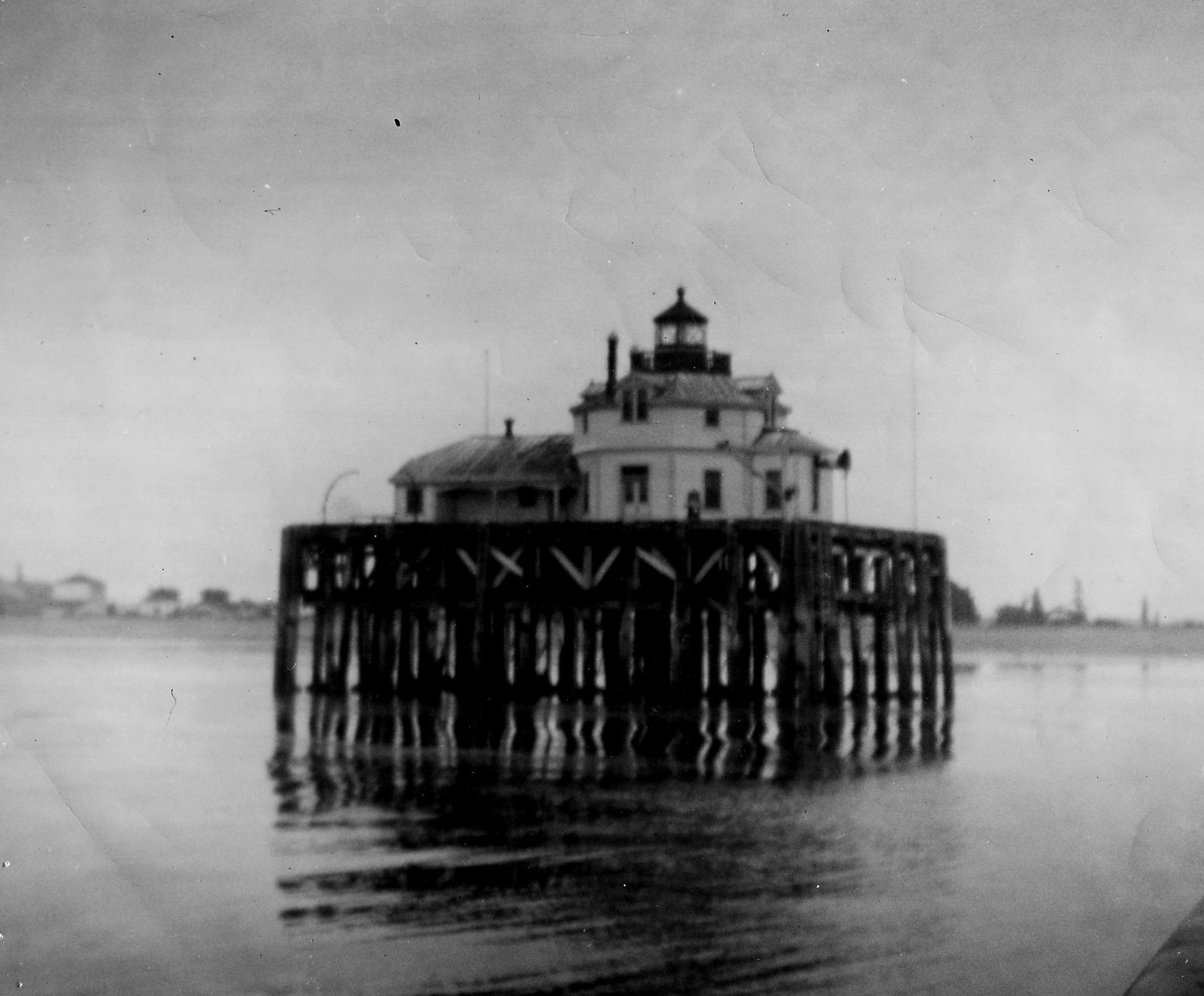
- Semiahmoo Harbor Light (USCG/1943)
- Location: Blaine, Washington
- Coordinates: 48.99219°N 122.78406°W

Tower
- Constructed: 1905
- Foundation: Piling
- Construction: Wood
- Shape: Octagonal

Light
- First lit: 1905
- Deactivated: 1944
- Lens: Fourth order Fresnel lens
- Characteristic: F R (–Unknown)

The Semiahmoo Harbor Lighthouse was a lighthouse on Semiahmoo (/ˌsɛmiˈɑːmoʊ/ SEM-ee-AH-moh) Bay near the port of Blaine, Whatcom County, Washington, in the United States.

== History ==
The station consisted of a 1½-story dwelling built on a platform supported by wooden piles, with a lantern at the center of its peaked roof. It was constructed in 1905, using the same design by U.S. Lighthouse Board Architect Carl Leick used at the Desdemona Sands Lighthouse at the mouth of the Columbia River. The light was deactivated and the entire structure torn down in 1944.
