= Lions Lighthouse =

Lighthouse

Coordinates: 33°45′36.9″N 118°11′38.8″W

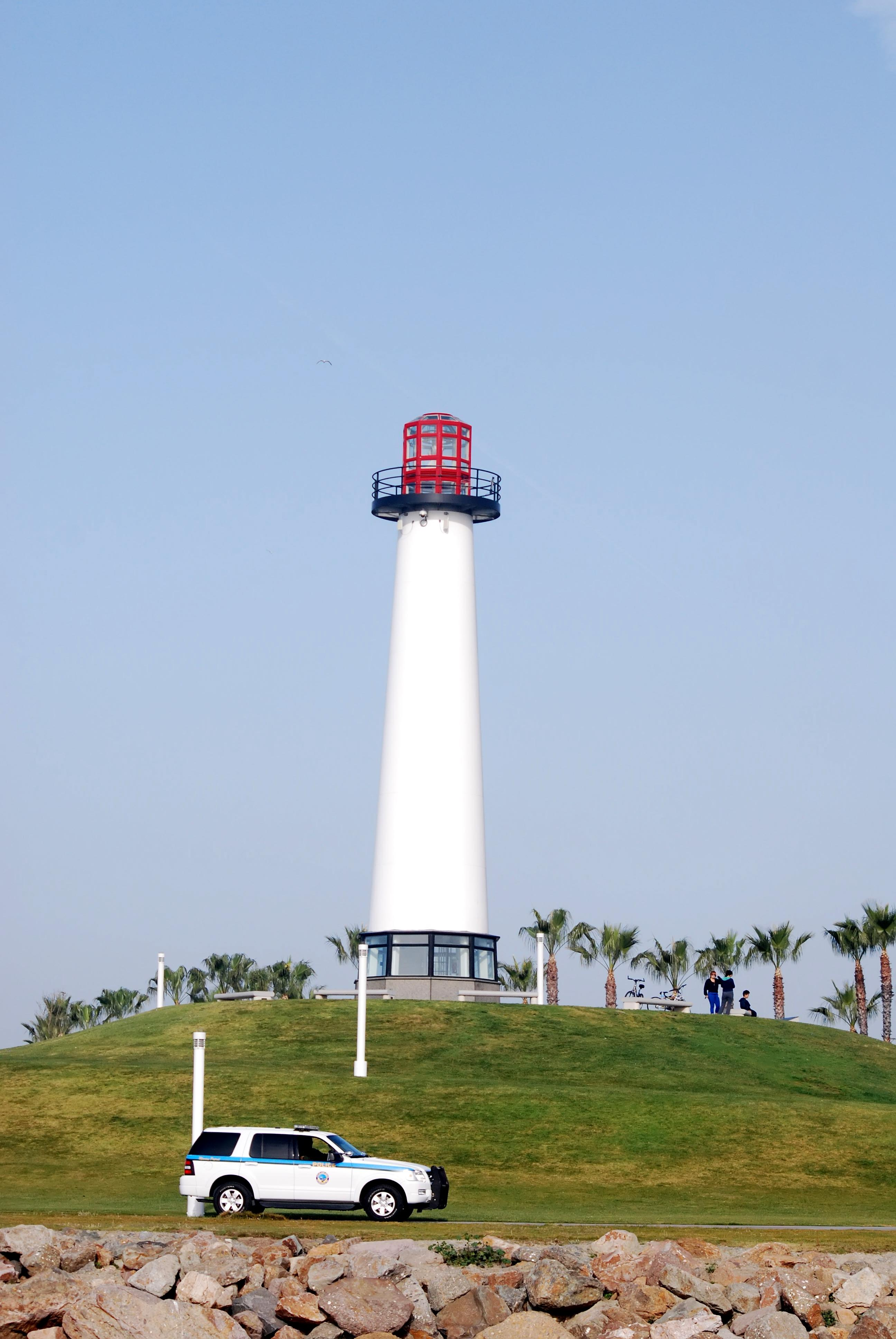
Lions Lighthouse

Lions Lighthouse (also known as the Lions Lighthouse for Sight) is a decorative lighthouse located in Shoreline Marina, Long Beach, California. It was funded by the Downtown Long Beach Lions Clubs International to advertise their services to blind people and was first lit in 2000. Its focal height is 65.62 ft (20.00 m). The RMS Queen Mary is visible from the light's location at ShoreLine Aquatic Park. The Aquarium of the Pacific is nearby. The nearest harbor is Rainbow Harbor. The light is popular for scenic viewing.
