= Sugar Pine Point Light =

Lighthouse in California, United States

Sugar Pine Point Lighthouse
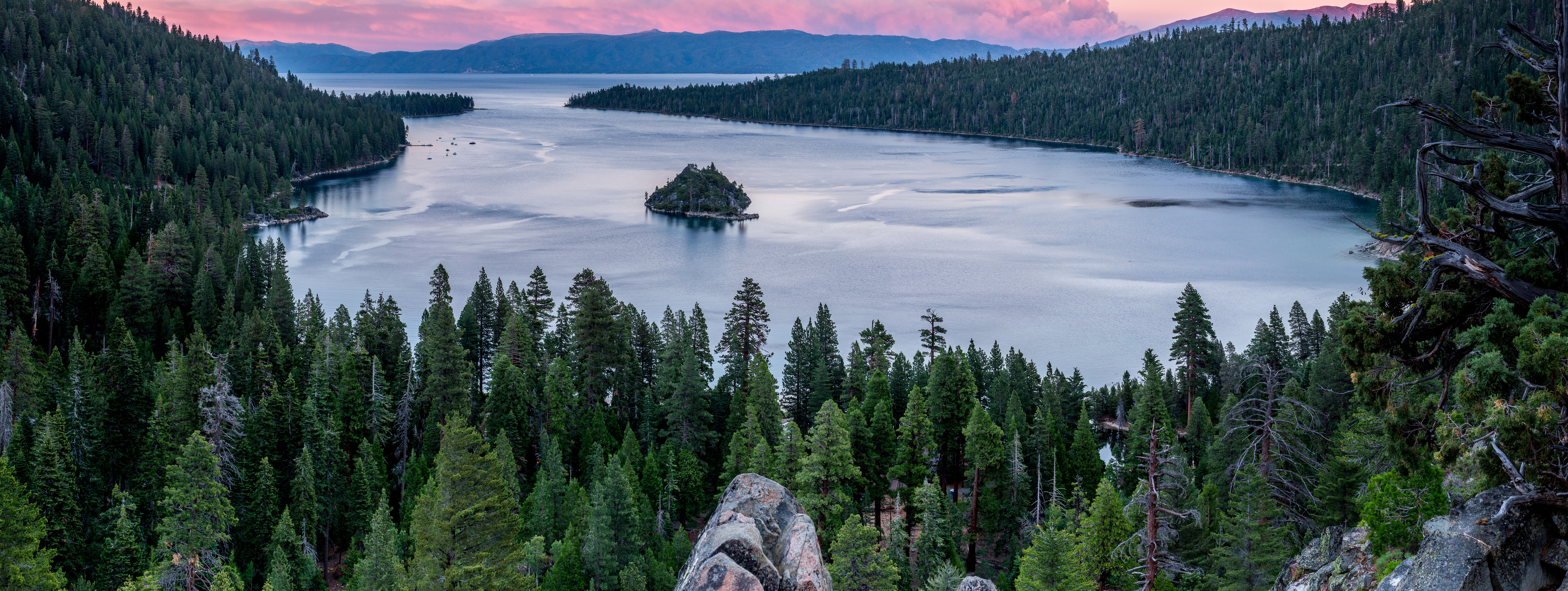
- Location: Sugar Pine Point; Tahoma; Lake Tahoe; California; United States
- Coordinates: 39.061266°N 120.113971°W

Tower
- Constructed: 1921 (first)
- Foundation: metal platform
- Construction: steel pole (current) wooden tower (first)
- Automated: 1985
- Height: 4.5 metres (15 ft)
- Shape: pole with beacon on a platform (current) square tower (first)
- Markings: white and red daymark
- Power source: solar power
- Operator: Ed Z'berg Sugar Pine Point State Park

Light
- First lit: 1985 (current)
- Deactivated: 1985 (first)
- Focal height: 4 metres (13 ft)
- Characteristic: Fl W 4s.

The Sugar Pine Point Light was a small lighthouse located on Lake Tahoe, in El Dorado County, California, in the United States. The Lighthouse was once the highest in the nation; located at over 6,200 feet above sea level. The tower no longer stands, but a small post light marks the site. It is located within the bounds of Ed Z'berg Sugar Pine Point State Park.

== History ==
In 1921, various commercial interests lobbied for the replacement of the Rubicon Point Light with a light on Sugar Pine Point. It was suggested that the light be housed in a small frame tower similar to the one at Rubicon Point, and that the characteristic light not be changed.

The light was apparently built, but was discontinued in 1935. It was relit the following year at a cost of $590.52.

== See also ==
- List of lighthouses in the United States
