= Rubicon Point Light =

Lighthouse in California, United States

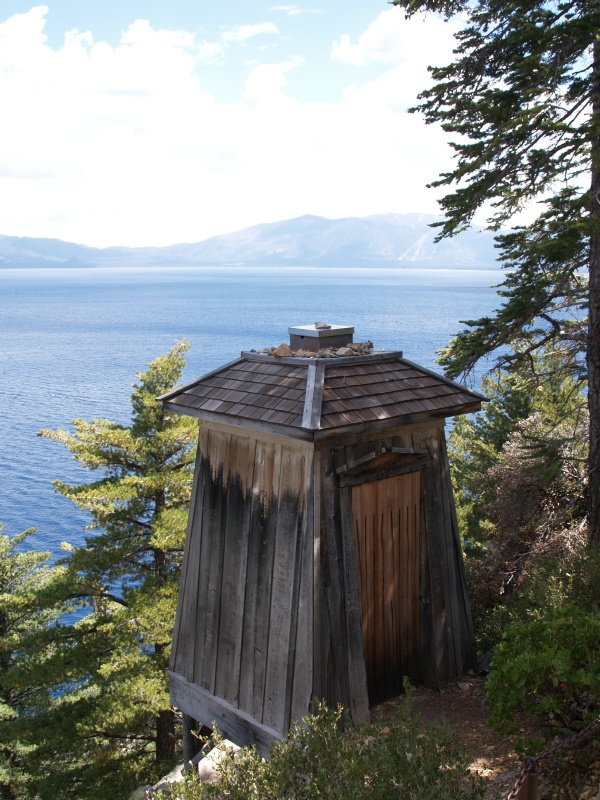
- Rubicon Point Light
- Location: Rubicon Point; Lake Tahoe; California; United States
- Coordinates: 38°59′45″N 120°05′41″W

Tower
- Constructed: 1916
- Construction: wooden tower
- Height: 12 feet (3.7 m)
- Shape: square tower with no lantern
- Markings: unpainted tower
- Operator: D.L. Bliss State Park

Light
- Deactivated: 1921

The Rubicon Point Light is a small lighthouse on Lake Tahoe in California.

== History ==
The lighthouse was requested, along with buoys for the lake, in 1913 by the Lake Tahoe Protective Association, and was built under the direction of J. J. Bodilsen in 1916; the work was done by the United States Coast Guard. The keeper was paid $180 per year, and was "required to furnish his own launch for visiting and recharging the light and in addition to shipping and receiving supplies for the light will be required to make a short trip each night to a point from which the light can be observed, there being no year around resident on the lake who can properly inspect the light from his residence." Official sources state that the light was only lit for three years, until 1919; some locals, however, report that the tower was lit until sometime in the 1920s or 1930s. Still others report that it was discontinued in 1921. It was replaced by a light at Sugar Pine Point.

The light at Rubicon Point was acetylene-powered. Two 300-gallon tanks of the fuel were brought to Emerald Point daily, then taken to the light by mule or wagon. Maintaining the lighthouse was expensive; this appears to be the reason why it was abandoned fairly quickly. Over the years it has deteriorated to the point that many people mistake it for an outhouse. Today efforts are being made to restore the tower.

The lighthouse at Rubicon Point has the 2nd highest elevation of any American lighthouse; it stands 6,300 feet (1,900 m) above sea level, at a point where it could be seen from most places around the lake. It is currently located in D. L. Bliss State Park. Dillon Reservoir Lighthouse has the highest elevation of any American lighthouse; it stands 9,017 feet (2,748 m) above sea level, at Frisco Bay on Dillon Lake in Colorado.

The Rubicon Point Light was added to the Lighthouse Digest Doomsday List in 1997.

== See also ==
- List of lighthouses in the United States
