= Point Fermin Light =

Lighthouse in California, United States

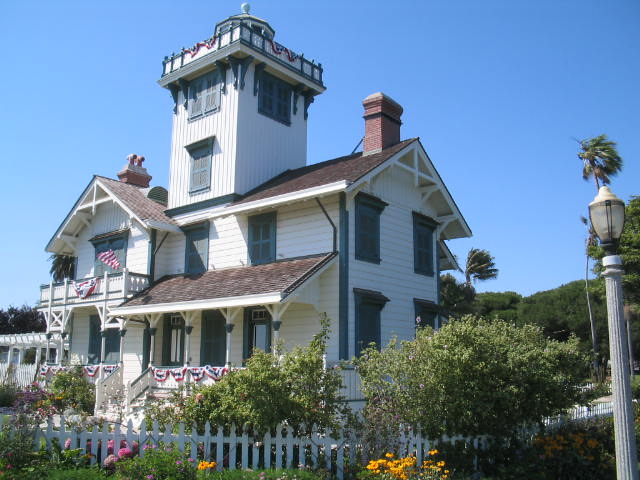
- Point Fermin Light
- Location: Point Fermin; San Pedro, Los Angeles; California; United States
- Coordinates: 33.705420°N 118.293649°W

Tower
- Constructed: 1874
- Foundation: brick basement
- Construction: wooden tower (first) metal pole (current)
- Height: 30 feet (9.1 m) (first)
- Shape: square tower with balcony and lantern (first) pole with light (current)
- Markings: white tower, grey trim (first)
- Operator: Los Angeles Department of Recreation and Parks
- Heritage: National Register of Historic Places listed place

Light
- First lit: 1874
- Deactivated: 1942
- Focal height: 120 feet (37 m) (current)
- Lens: Fourth order Fresnel lens
- Characteristic: Fl W 10s. (Metal pole)
- Point Fermin Lighthouse
- U.S. National Register of Historic Places
- NRHP reference No.: 72000234
- Added to NRHP: June 13, 1972

Point Fermin Light is a lighthouse on Point Fermin in the San Pedro neighborhood of Los Angeles, California.

== History ==
The lighthouse was built in 1874 with lumber from California redwoods. It was designed by Paul J. Pelz who also designed Point Fermin's sister stations, East Brother Island Light in Richmond, California, Mare Island Light, in Carquinez Strait, California (demolished in the 1930s), Point Hueneme Light in California (replaced in 1940), Hereford Inlet Light in North Wildwood, New Jersey, and Point Adams Light in Washington State (burned down by the Lighthouse Service in 1912), all in essentially the same style. In 1941, the light was extinguished due to the bombing of Pearl Harbor. There was fear that the light would serve as a beacon for enemy planes and ships. The original fourth order Fresnel lens was removed in 1942. The lighthouse was saved from demolition in 1972 and added to the National Register of Historic Places. The light fell into disuse and disrepair and the lantern room and gallery were removed. The site was refurbished in 1974 including a new lantern room and gallery were built by local preservationists in 1974. A wood replica lantern was also installed.

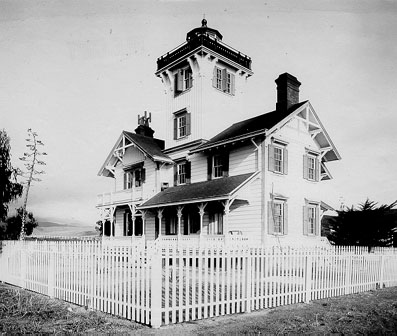
Lighthouse from the U.S. Coast Guard Archive

The original Fresnel lens from the lighthouse, removed in the 1940s, had been missing for decades. After being found and positively identified, on November 13, 2006, the lens was relocated to a display in the restored lighthouse museum from the real estate office of Louis Busch in Malibu, California, where it had been on display.

In June 2011, the General Services Administration made the Point Fermin Light (along with 11 others) available at no cost to public organizations willing to preserve them. The restored site was open to the public as the Point Fermin Lighthouse Historic Site and Museum.

== In popular culture ==
The Point Fermin lighthouse has featured as a filming location in several television series productions. From 1977 to 1978, in four television films and the television series of Man from Atlantis, the lighthouse was used to represent the fictional 'The Foundation for Oceanic Research' headquarters building for the TV series. In 1979, Point Fermin and the lighthouse featured in the first-season episode of the television series Hart to Hart, in "Hit Jennifer Hart". In 1986, the lighthouse appeared in a second-season episode of Amazing Stories, in "Magic Saturday". In 1988, the lighthouse was featured in the fifth-season episode of Murder, She Wrote, in 'Mr. Penroy's Vacation'. The lighthouse also featured in two episodes of MacGyver: "Flames End" and "D.O.A.: MacGyver".

In 1999, the lighthouse was featured as the Griffin residence in Duwayne Dunham's 1999 made-for-television film The Thirteenth Year.

In 2007, the lighthouse is featured in the Huell Howser "Visiting" television series, in the documentary episode 'Pt. Fermin Lighthouse Lens' in the interview series 'Visiting... with Huell Howser.

The lighthouse heavily inspired the El Gordo Lighthouse, which appears in the 2013 videogame Grand Theft Auto V.

== See also ==
- List of lighthouses in the United States
- List of Los Angeles Historic-Cultural Monuments in the Harbor area
- List of parks in Los Angeles
- The Sunken City – Unofficial tourist attraction in Los Angeles
