= Mare Island Light =

Lighthouse in California, United States

Mare Island Lighthouse
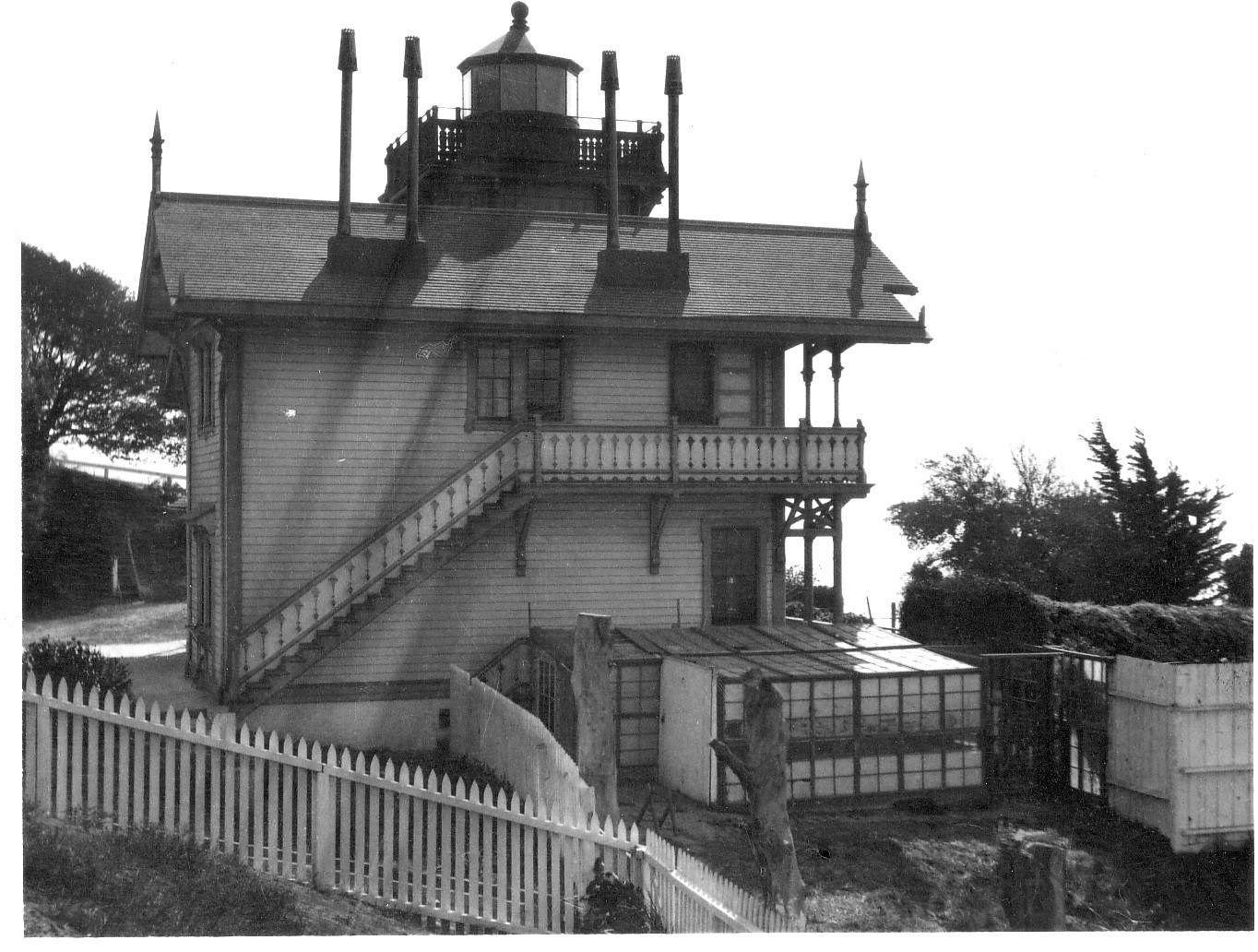
- View of the light from the north side
- Location: Mare Island; Vallejo; California; United States
- Coordinates: 38.074834°N 122.250464°W

Tower
- Constructed: 1873
- Construction: wooden tower
- Height: 76 feet (23 m)
- Shape: square tower with balcony and lantern attached to dwelling

Light
- First lit: 1873
- Deactivated: 1917
- Focal height: 12 m (39 ft)
- Lens: Fourth order Fresnel lens
- Characteristic: F W

Mare Island Lighthouse was a lighthouse in California, United States, on the north shore of San Pablo Bay at the entrance to Carquinez Strait, California.

== History ==
Mare Island Light was built in 1873, deactivated in 1917, and demolished in the 1930s. The lighthouse was designed by Paul J. Pelz, who also designed Mare Island's sister stations, Point Fermin Light in San Pedro CA, East Brother Island Light in Richmond, California, Point Hueneme Light in California (replaced in 1940), Hereford Inlet Light in North Wildwood, New Jersey, and Point Adams Light in Washington State (burned down by the Lighthouse Service in 1912), all in essentially the same style.

The United States Lighthouse Board later realized that a light positioned offshore near the junction of the strait and river would better serve navigation in the area. The Carquinez Strait Light opened in 1909 to replace this light in purpose, but in an offshore location, between the two channels.

A Navy Direction Finding Station was later erected on the site in 1942, run by U.S. Navy radio operators stationed at Naval Radio Station, Mare Island. The station was closed in 1945 after World War II ended and a Navy Radio Beacon was installed.

== Gallery ==
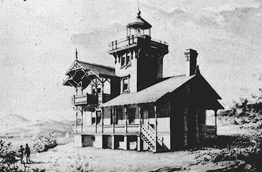
1879 Print – U.S. Coast Guard Archive

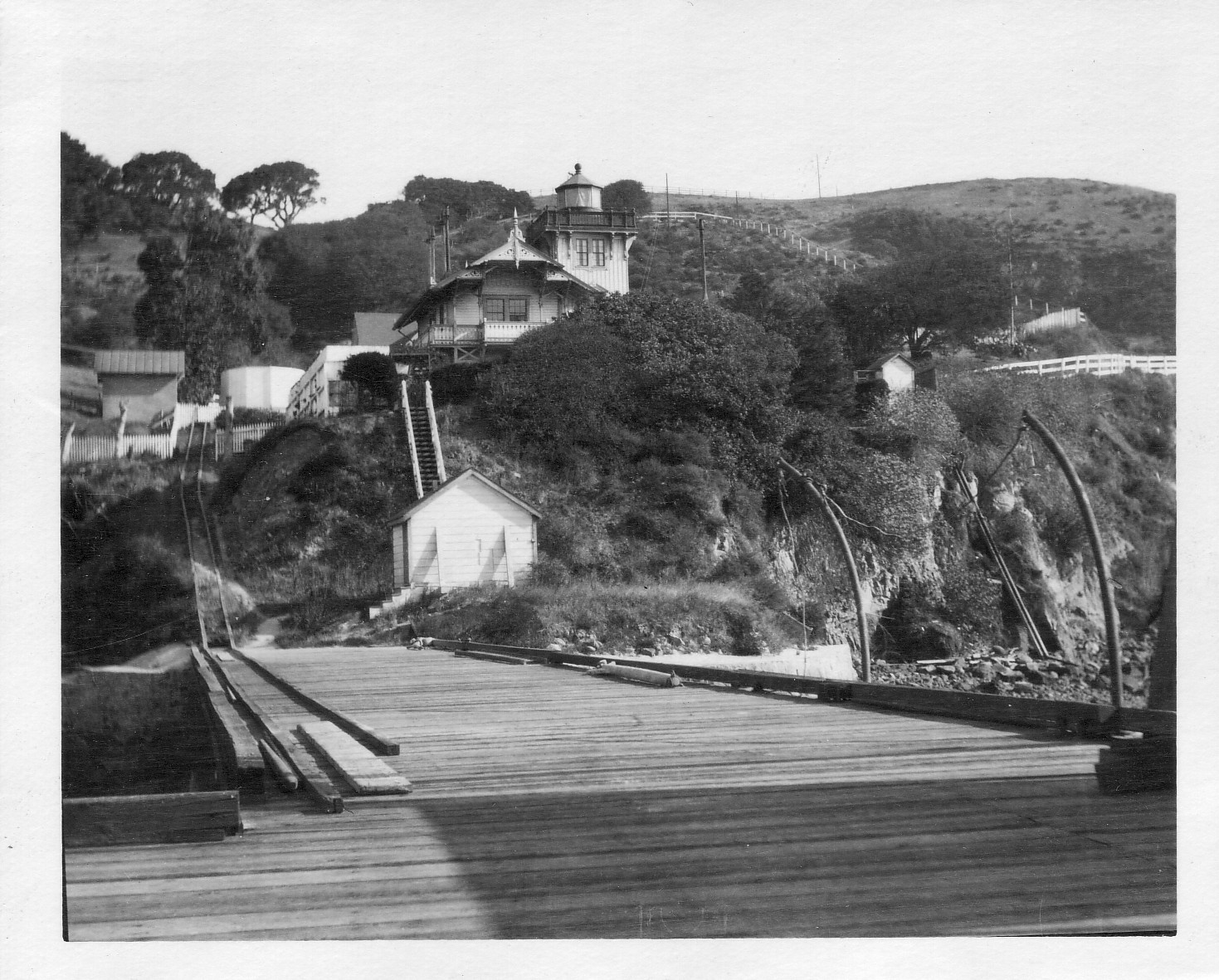
View from pier looking ashore and up at light station – U.S. Coast Guard Archive

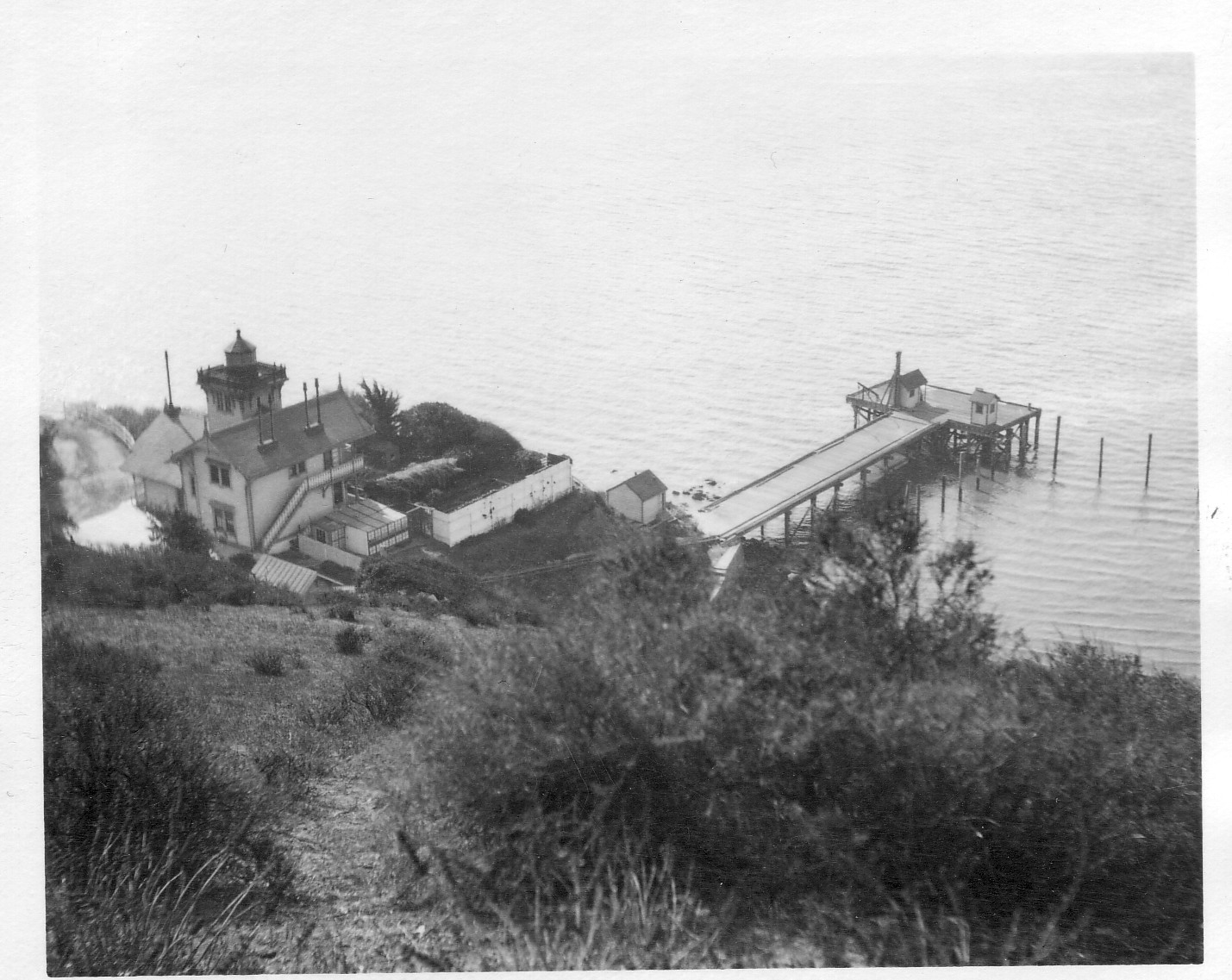
View from atop mountain down at the light station and pier – U.S. Coast Guard Archive

== See also ==
- List of lighthouses in the United States
