= East Brother Island Light =

Lighthouse in California, United States

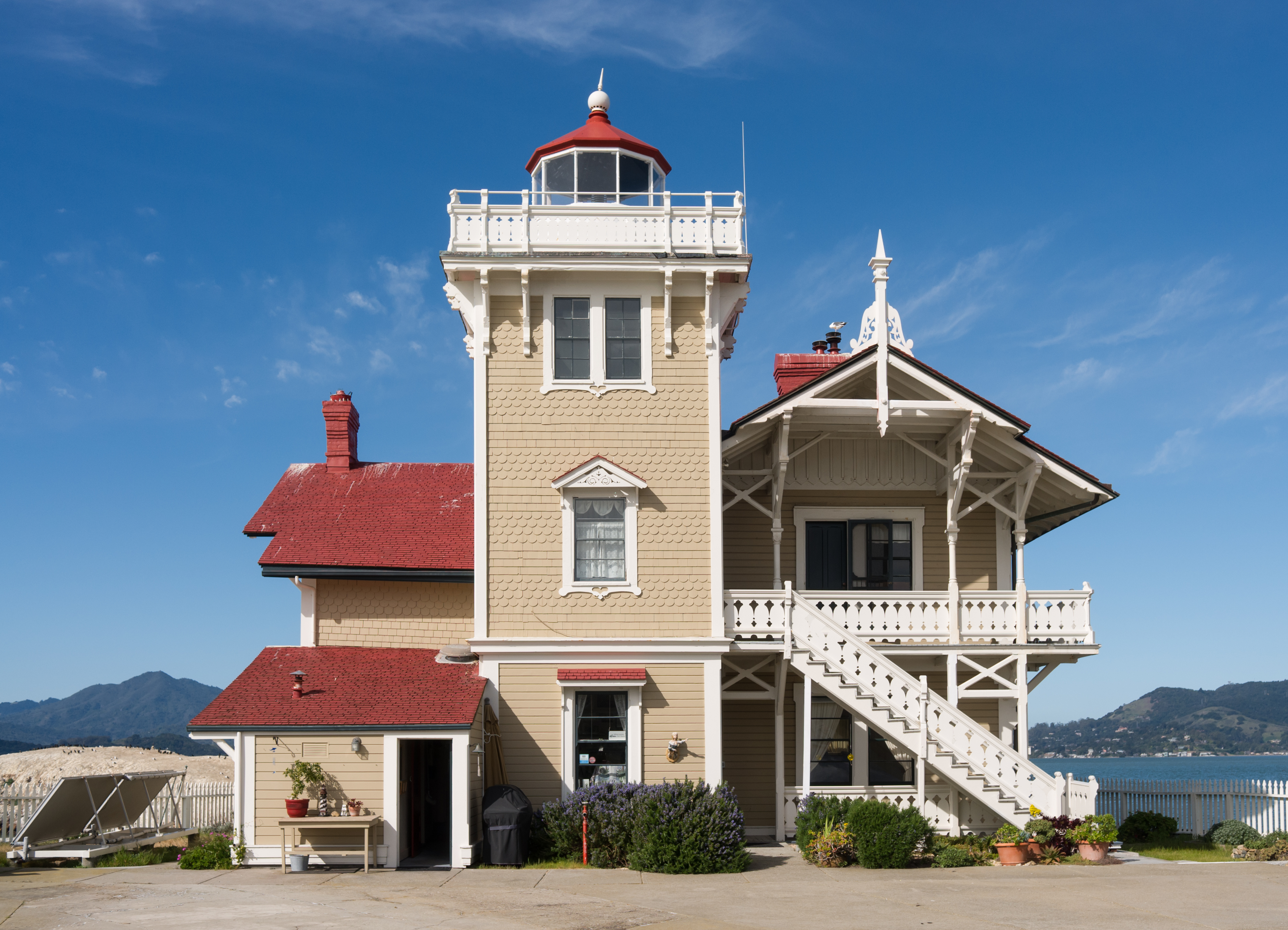
- Front view of lighthouse.
- Location: East Brother Island; San Pablo Bay; San Francisco Bay Area; California; United States
- Coordinates: 37.963233°N 122.433643°W

Tower
- Constructed: 1874
- Construction: wooden tower
- Automated: 1969
- Height: 48 feet (15 m)
- Shape: square tower with balcony and lantern attached to a 2-story keeper's house
- Markings: ochre tower with white trim, red lantern
- Operator: East Brother Light Station
- Heritage: National Register of Historic Places listed place
- Fog signal: blast every 30s. Foghorn at East Brother Island

Light
- First lit: 1 March 1874
- Focal height: 61 feet (19 m)
- Lens: Fourth order Fresnel lens (original), FA 251 (current)
- Characteristic: Fl W 5s.
- East Brother Island Light Station
- U.S. National Register of Historic Places
- California Historical Landmark
- Area: 0.7 acres (0.28 ha)
- Built: 1873
- NRHP reference No.: 71000138
- CHISL No.: 951
- Added to NRHP: February 12, 1971

East Brother Island Lighthouse is a lighthouse located on East Brother Island in San Rafael Bay, near the tip of Point San Pablo in Richmond, California. It marks the entrance to San Pablo Bay from San Francisco Bay.

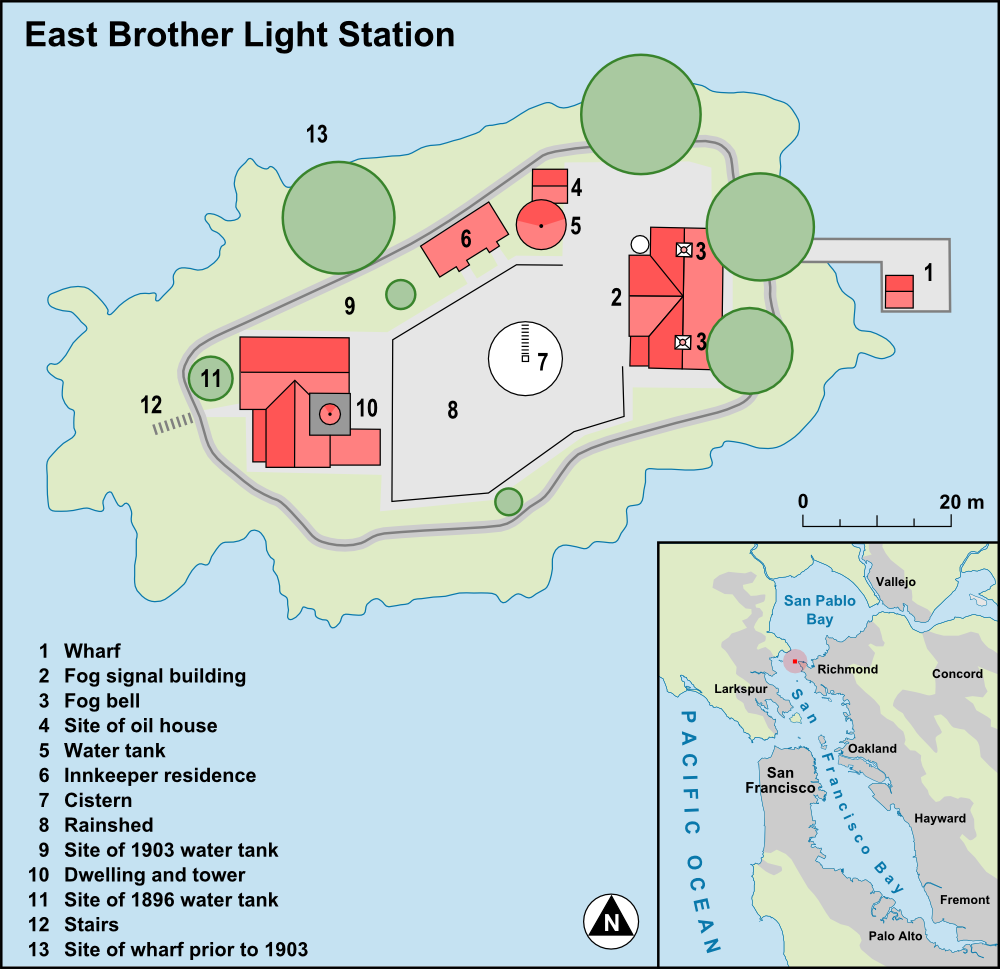
Map of East Brother Island

Built in 1874 and automated in 1969, the lighthouse was designed in the American Stick style by Paul J. Pelz, who also designed East Brother Island's sister stations, Point Fermin Light in San Pedro CA, Mare Island Light, in Carquinez Strait, California (demolished in the 1930s), Point Hueneme Light in California (replaced in 1940), Hereford Inlet Light in North Wildwood, New Jersey, and Point Adams Light in Washington State (burned down by the Lighthouse Service in 1912), all in essentially the same style. The former keeper's house began operating as a bed and breakfast in 1980.

== History ==
Although the U.S. government recognized the need for a light to mark the area, mainland property was not available at a reasonable price. Instead the government turned its attention to the island, which it already owned. Large-scale blasting leveled the island off, and the two-story keeper's house was built with the attached tower and a fog signal building. The lamp was first lit on March 1, 1874.

The light tower is attached to the keeper's house, a two-story Victorian placed on a blasted away 1-acre (0.40 ha) rock. There was an assistant keeper's house, equipment building, cistern, and water tank. The water cistern was blasted to a depth of 30 feet (9.1 m) and is capable of holding 50,000 US gallons (190 m^{3}) of rainwater.

Two of the most notable lighthouse keepers were John Stenmark and Willard Miller, each of whom logged twenty years of service, more than any other keeper. Originally from Sweden, Stenmark joined the lighthouse service at age twenty and distinguished himself for bravery during a boating accident. He was eventually appointed keeper at East Brother in 1894, and he lived at the station with his wife and four children. Miller began his tenure at East Brother in 1922. During his service the light was upgraded to a fixed, fifth-order Fresnel lens, powered by a 500-watt bulb. The steam fog signal was also converted to a compressor-driven diaphone. A serious accident on March 4, 1940, resulted in a fire that destroyed the island's wharf and boathouse along with four boats.

The United States Lighthouse Service ran the lighthouse operation until 1939, when the Lighthouse Service merged with the United States Coast Guard. Large families occupied the lighthouse. They had to light the original lens wick and keep it filled with whale oil. On many foggy nights, they would have to fire up the steam boilers to drive the foghorns, hauling coal up the long ramp from the boat. After the lighthouse was automated, the government wanted to tear down the keeper's house and other buildings, but protests from local residents prevented the demolition. The lighthouse was listed on the National Register of Historic Places in 1971. After several years of neglect, a non-profit group, East Brother Light Station, Inc., was formed in 1979 to restore the landmark. Government grants, private donations, and volunteer labor restored the structures on the island, which are now used for the bed-and-breakfast.

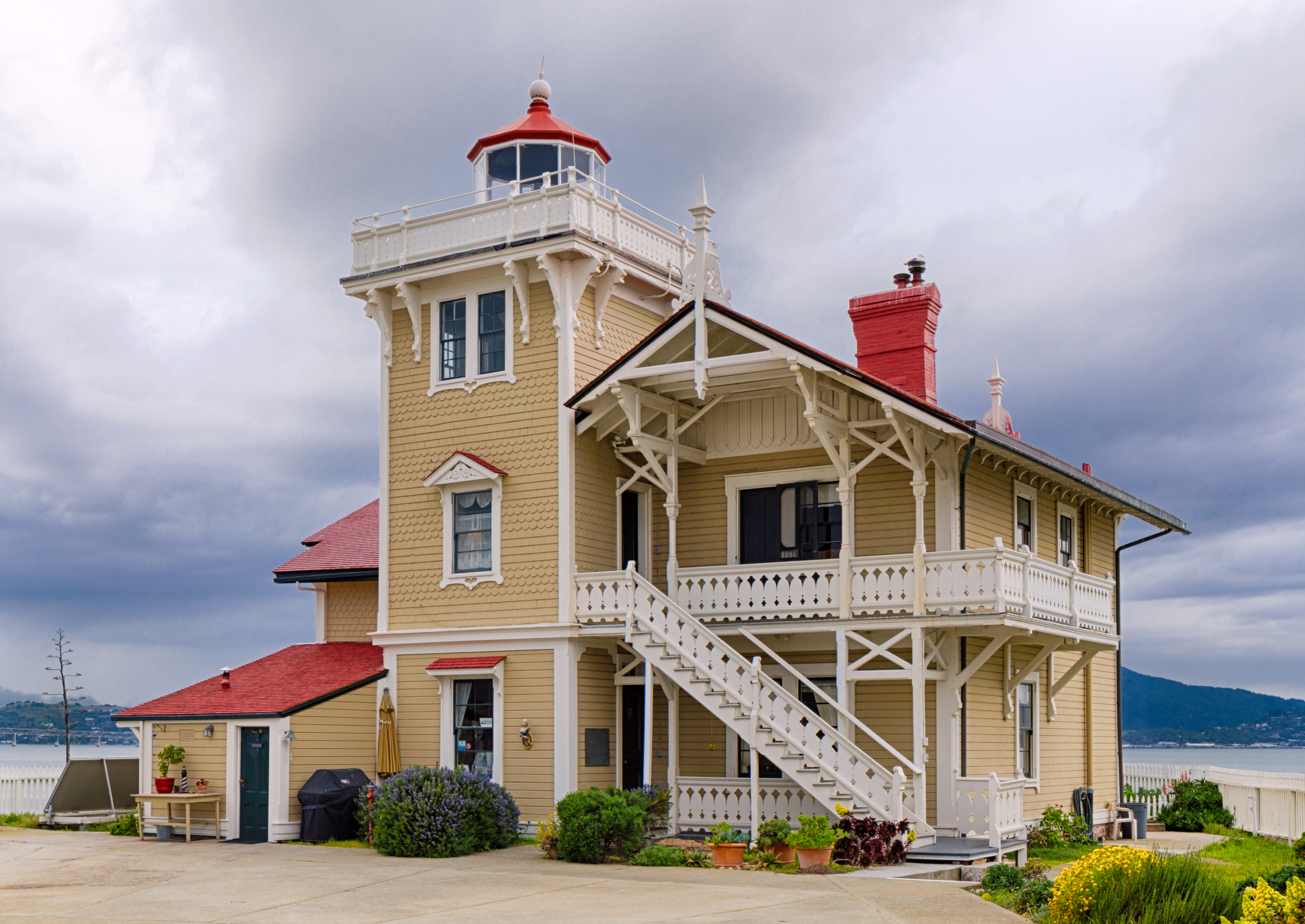
East Brother Light in 2013

The light as seen from the deck of the World War II Liberty Ship SS Jeremiah O'Brien

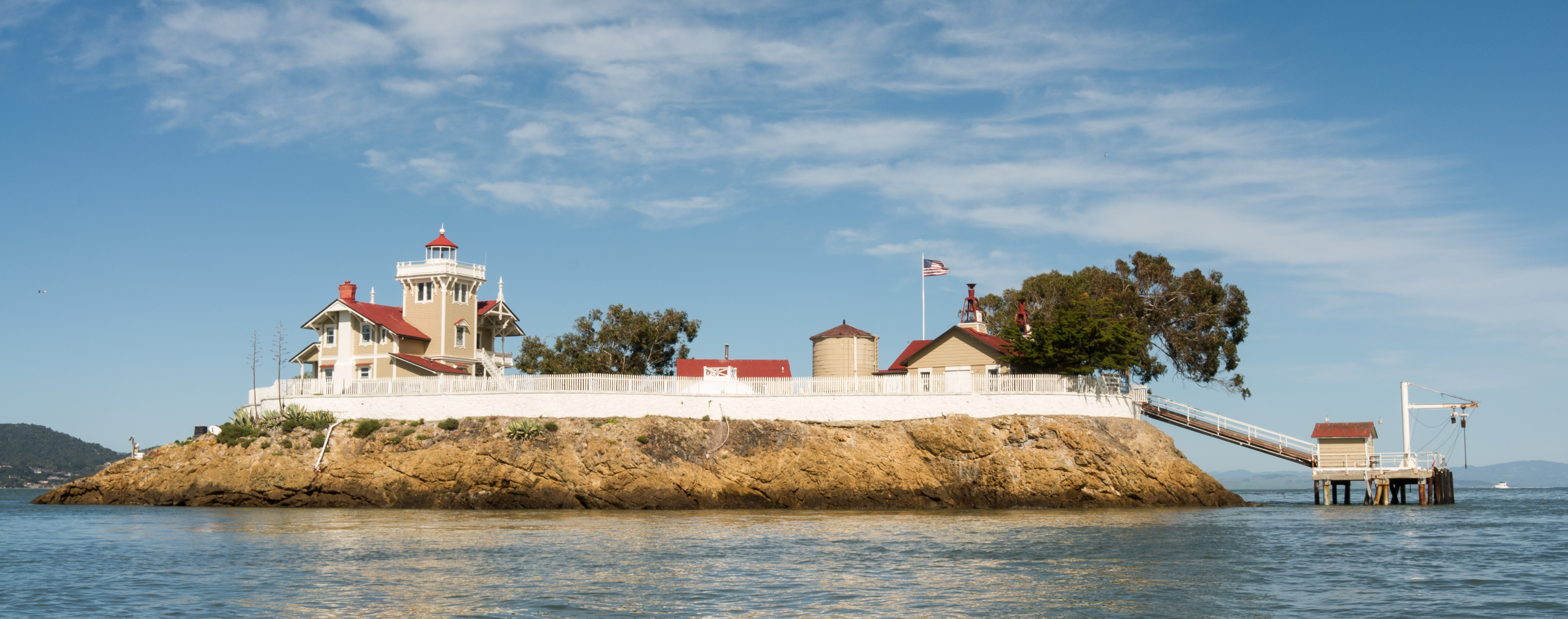
Panoramic view of East Brother Island Light Station

== See also ==
- List of lighthouses in the United States
- The Brothers (San Francisco Bay)
