= Southampton Shoal Light =

Lighthouse in California, United States

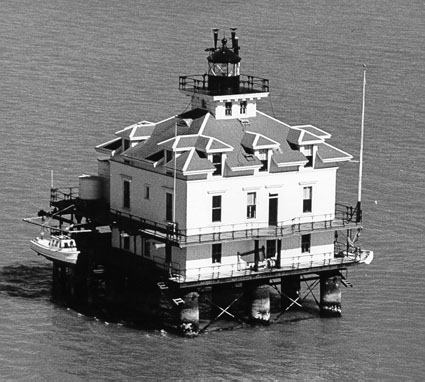
- Location: Southampton Shoals; San Francisco Bay; California; United States
- Coordinates: 37°52′54.981″N 122°24′00.837″W

Tower
- Constructed: 1905 (first)
- Foundation: wooden piles
- Construction: wooden tower (first) metal pole (current)
- Automated: yes
- Height: 10 m (33 ft)
- Shape: square tower with balcony and lantern on a 3-storey keeper's house (first) pole with beacon on platform (current)
- Markings: white tower, black lantern (first) white pole (current)
- Operator: St. Francis Yacht Club (first); United States Coast Guard (current)

Light
- First lit: n/a (current)
- Deactivated: 1960
- Focal height: 10 m (33 ft)
- Lens: 5th order Fresnel lens (on display at the Angel Island Interpretive Centre)
- Characteristic: Fl W 4s. (first); Iso R 6s. (current)

Southampton Shoal is a former lighthouse site in California, United States. A platform sits at the southwest edge of Southampton Shoals, northeast of Angel Island in the San Francisco Bay. The platform is all that remains of the original structure and supports an automated bell which chimes every ten seconds and red light mounted on a pole, which flashes on for three seconds and is then dark for three seconds in each six second cycle (Iso R 6s).

== History ==
Southampton Shoal Lighthouse was a square building built on a platform supported by wooden piers. It was built and first lit in 1905 with a fifth order Fresnel lens. The original lens is on display at the Angel Island Interpretive Center.

In 1960, the structure was moved to Tinsley Island 38.035986°N 121.494152°W which is a private island in the San Joaquin River delta close to Stockton. The island is owned by the St. Francis Yacht Club of San Francisco. The building is now in use for lodging.

== See also ==
- List of lighthouses in the United States

== Sources ==
- "Historic Light Station Information and Photography: California". United States Coast Guard Historian's Office. 2013-09-16. Archived from the original on 2017-05-01.
- Light List, Volume VI, Pacific Coast and Pacific Islands (PDF). Light List. United States Coast Guard. 2014. p. 46. ID COMDTPUB P16502.6
