= Carquinez Strait Light =

Lighthouse in California, United States

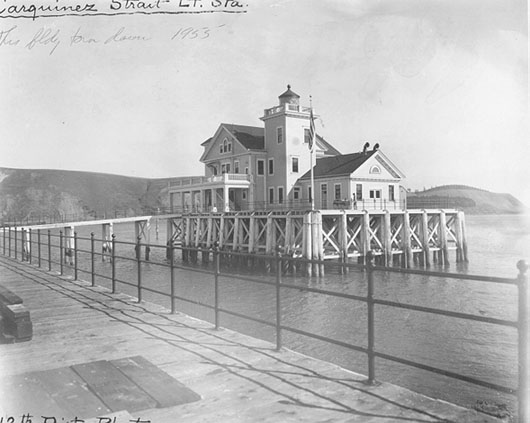
- Carquinez Strait Light
- Location: Vallejo; California; United States
- Coordinates: 38.067816°N 122.213832°W

Tower
- Constructed: 1910 (first)
- Foundation: wooden pier
- Construction: wooden tower
- Automated: 1963
- Shape: square tower with balcony and lantern attached to keeper's house
- Markings: cream colour tower and house, red lantern roof
- Operator: The Lighthouse at the Glen Cove Marina

Light
- First lit: 1963 (automated beacon and fog signal at the pier)
- Deactivated: 1951 (first)
- Lens: fourth order Fresnel lens
- Characteristic: F R

Carquinez Strait Lighthouse is a lighthouse in California, United States. It was originally approximately 20 miles inland from the mouth of the San Francisco Bay near Vallejo, California.

== History ==
The first lighthouse to mark the entrance to Carquinez Strait and the Napa River, the Mare Island Light was built at the southern end of Mare Island in 1873. The United States Lighthouse Board later realized that a light positioned offshore near the junction of the strait and river would better serve navigation in the area. The lighthouse was deactivated in 1951 and an automated beacon and fog signal were placed on the pier. After years of neglect, which included the smashing of the lens by vandals, the building was saved by investors who moved the residence to the Glen Cove Marina in Vallejo, California.

=== Historical information from Coast Guard web site ===
- The Lighthouse Board relayed to Congress the need for a lighthouse between the San Francisco Bay and the Sacramento River. On January 15, 1910, the Carquinez Strait Light was lit.
- The lighthouse stood at the end of a 1.5-mile pier and was attached to a three-story residence.
- While in operation this site was used to test the vertical mushroom trumpet fog signals.
- The lighthouse was deactivated in 1951. An automated beacon and fog signal were placed on the pier at that time.
- After years of neglect, which included the smashing of the lens by vandals, the building was saved by investors who moved the residence to the Glen Cove Marina in Vallejo, California.
- The residence, without the tower, is used as the marina office and yacht sales showroom.

=== Additional information ===
Taken from a December 1966 USCG press release:

Carquinez Strait Light Station is an automatic light station located at Vallejo, California between Suisun Bay and San Pablo Bay. It was first placed into operation on January 15, 1910. The original structure, a 28-room light house weighing 150 tons, was used until abandoned by the Coast Guard in 1951. New family quarters were constructed on top of the bluff overlooking San Pablo Bay and the entrances to Carquinez Strait and Mare Island Strait. On August 6, 1955, the original structure was taken off its pilings and put aboard a barge. It was then successfully towed two miles to its new location at Elliott Cove and converted into a resort. The new buildings were constructed in 1951 on top of the bluff The main family dwelling consisted of two 3~bedroom and two 2 bedrooms. The men assigned maintained and operated the light at the end of the breakwater and an automatic fog signal. In addition, the unit was responsible for providing emergency repairs on five aids to navigation in the vicinity of the station. A 24-hour lookout was maintained. On June 3, 1963, the Coast Guard personnel were transferred from the station and the light and fog signal were automated.

== See also ==
- List of lighthouses in the United States
