= Pacific Grove Golf Links =

Golf course in Pacific Grove, California

- Location within California
- 36.6336°N 121.9315°W

Club information
- Location: Pacific Grove, California
- Established: May 9, 1932; 94 years ago
- Type: Public
- Total holes: 18
- Website: www.playpacificgrove.com
- Designed by: H. Chandler Egan (Front Nine); Jack Neville (Back Nine)
- Par: 70
- Length: 5727
- Course rating: 67.9
- Slope rating: 113

Pacific Grove Golf Links is a public 18-hole golf course owned by the city of Pacific Grove, California.

Originally designed by Chandler Egan in 1932, the first nine holes are laid out through the forested areas of Pacific Grove. The back nine was designed by Jack Neville, original designer of the Pebble Beach Golf Links in Pebble Beach, California, and overlook Point Pinos, where the Pacific Ocean and Monterey Bay meet on the northern tip of the Monterey Peninsula. The golf links is also site of the Point Pinos Lighthouse. The 18-hole golf course features a restaurant as well as a golf pro shop.

Pacific Grove Municipal Golf Links was ranked by Zagat Survey as one of America's Best Golf Courses and by Golf Magazine as One of the Nation's Top 50 Golf Courses Under $50.

== Scorecard ==
Pacific Grove Golf Links
Tee	Rating/Slope	1	2	3	4	5	6	7	8	9	Out	10	11	12	13	14	15	16	17	18	In	Total
Blue	67.9 / 113	146	199	312	265	520	533	310	424	218	2927	109	303	513	316	356	397	355	153	298	2800	5727
White	67.0 / 110	146	193	305	259	510	527	304	419	213	2876	104	273	497	307	348	383	351	138	294	2695	5571
Par		3	3	4	4	5	5	4	4	3	35	3	4	5	4	4	4	4	3	4	35	70
SI		15	9	13	17	7	1	11	3	5		18	12	4	10	6	2	8	16	14
White	72.3 / 120	146	193	305	259	510	527	304	419	213	2876	104	273	497	307	348	383	351	138	294	2695	5571
Red	70.2 / 116	141	187	298	253	504	521	300	409	207	2820	97	265	480	283	328	305	336	100	291	2485	5305
Par		3	3	4	4	5	5	4	5	4	37	3	4	5	4	4	4	4	3	4	35	72
SI		17	15	9	11	3	1	7	5	13		18	12	2	14	4	8	10	16	6
