= Point Hueneme Light =

Lighthouse in California, United States

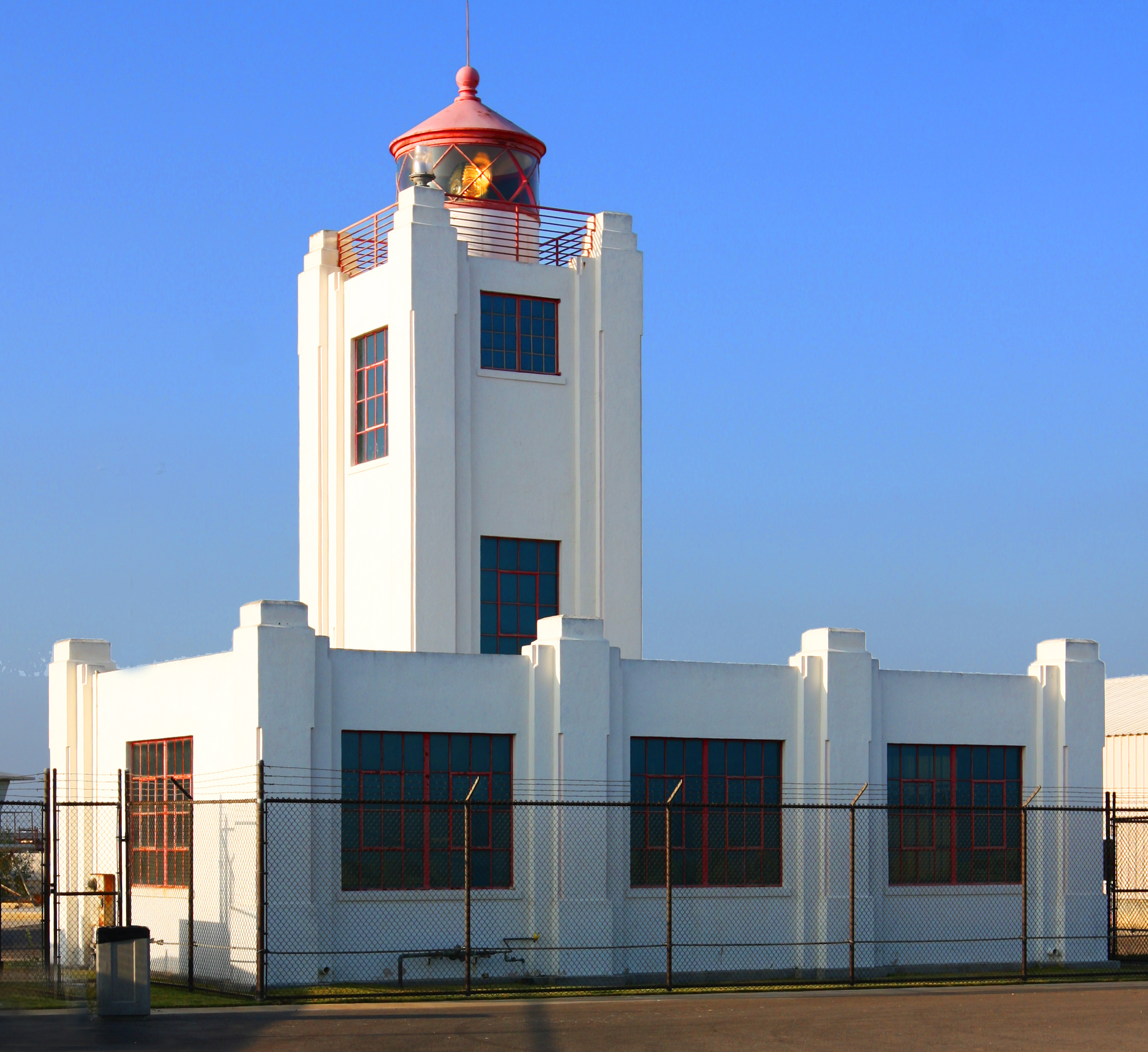
- Point Hueneme Lighthouse in 2009
- Location: Point Hueneme; Port Hueneme; California; United States
- Coordinates: 34.145176°N 119.210019°W

Tower
- Constructed: 1874 (first)
- Construction: concrete tower
- Automated: 1972
- Height: 48 ft (15 m)
- Shape: square tower with balcony and lantern on fog signal building
- Markings: art deco architecture, white tower, red lantern
- Operator: United States Coast Guard

Light
- First lit: 1941 (current)
- Focal height: 52 ft (16 m)
- Lens: Fourth order Fresnel lens (original), LED light (current)
- Range: 20 nmi (37 km; 23 mi)
- Characteristic: Fl W 5s.

Point Hueneme Lighthouse is a lighthouse on the southeast entrance to the Santa Barbara Channel, in Ventura County, California

== History ==
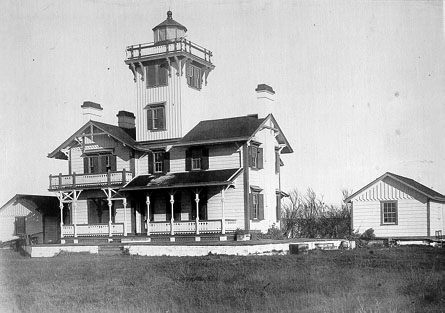
Original 1874 Lighthouse by Paul J. Pelz, USCG photo

Point Hueneme Light is a 48-foot-high (15 m), buff-colored 1940 Art Deco style tower on a fog-signal building on the Santa Barbara Channel at the Port of Hueneme.

The original lighthouse was completed in 1874 at Point Hueneme after the construction of a 900-foot-long wharf (270 m) in 1872. (Note: Later lengthened to 1,500-foot-long (460 m)) When a storm destroyed the wharf in 1938, Oxnard Harbor District was formed and finished construction of the Port of Hueneme in 1940. The extant lighthouse structure was completed in 1941. The fourth-order Fresnel lens was used in both the original and the current lighthouse towers until 2013. In November 2012, the Ventura County Cultural Heritage Board voted to preserve the 1899 lens by retiring it from active service, so it can be displayed on a lower floor of the lighthouse and more easily viewed by the public. The original 1874 lighthouse was designed by Paul J. Pelz, who also designed Point Hueneme's sister stations, Point Fermin Light in San Pedro CA, East Brother Island Light in Richmond, California, Mare Island Light, in Carquinez Strait, California (demolished in the 1930s), Hereford Inlet Light in North Wildwood, New Jersey, and Point Adams Light in Washington State (burned down by the Lighthouse Service in 1912), all in essentially the same style.

=== Shipwreck ===
Point Hueneme Light was the site of an unrelated shipwreck. The veteran passenger liner La Jenelle, once removed from her role as a cruise liner, lay at anchor off Port Hueneme on April 14, 1970 awaiting plans for conversion to a floating restaurant. The owners were attempting to cut down on moorage costs by leaving the vessel at anchor in the open ocean, directly offshore. With only one watchman aboard, the vessel fell victim to storm-tossed seas, causing the 465-foot-long (142 m) ship to slip her anchor cables. The California State Lands Commission became much concerned about the problem both from the standpoint of leaking oil and a menace to navigation. They voted unanimously to have the ship scrapped, "as is, where is," and accordingly put out bids. The big steel ship still remains but is being torn apart bit by bit by human and natural elements.

== Lighthouse tours ==
The lighthouse is federal property operated by the United States Coast Guard. The U.S. Coast Guards Aids to Navigation Team Los Angeles/Long Beach(CG ANT LA/LB) is in charge of operation and maintenance of the lighthouse and Fresnel Lens. Members from the U.S. Coast Guard Auxiliary, who are also members of the CG ANT LA/LB, are in charge of the tour and openhouse at the lighthouse. These members are recognized as Lighthouse Keepers by the USCG Auxiliary and Technicians by the CG.

In March 2008, the City of Port Hueneme and Oxnard Harbor District dedicated a new "Lighthouse Promenade", beginning at the Hueneme Sunset Beach alongside the perimeter fence of the port to the lighthouse. The 1/2 mile stroll is on a flat, even surface and allows visitors to stroll along the beach. There are no public restrooms on property, the nearest public restrooms are at the promenade's entrance at Sunset Beach.

== See also ==
- List of lighthouses in the United States
- Maritime history of California
- Ventura County Historic Landmarks & Points of Interest
