= Butler Sturtevant =

American architect

Butler Stevens Sturtevant (September 1, 1899 – April 11, 1971) was an American landscape architect.

== Early years ==
Butler Stevens Sturtevant, a ninth-generation Mayflower descendant, was born on September 1, 1899, in Delavan, Wisconsin to James Brown and Ada Belle Sturtevant. In 1918 he enrolled in the undergraduate horticulture program at the University of California, Southern Branch (now UCLA). He graduated in 1921. Concurrent with his studies, he gained practical construction experience working with several Southern California landscape architects including Florence Yoch, Charles Gibbs Adams, A. E. Hansen, and the firm of Cook, Hall and Cornell. In 1921, he sharpened his knowledge of plant materials and gained nursery experience working with Theodore Payne, the well-known specialist in California native plants.

== Education and working experiences ==
In 1922, he enrolled in the Harvard University Graduate School of Landscape Architecture and City Planning. He completed all work but his thesis, and did not earn his graduate degree. His classmates included Thomas Dolliver Church and Charles Eliot. Immediately following Harvard, Sturtevant worked for a series of offices. Initially, he returned to the firm of Cook Hall & Cornell, in Los Angeles, from 1924 to 1925, where he served as an office draftsman. This was followed by brief stints from 1925 to 1926 at Stiles & Van Kleek, in their St. Petersburg, Florida office; office manager and head designer for Fletcher Steele, in Boston, from 1926 to 1927; and as a designer with Gardner, Gardner & Fischer, in Los Angeles, from 1927 to 1928.

In 1928, he opened his own office in Seattle, Washington, to participate with architects Charles Bebb & Carl Freylinghausen Gould in the design of the Normandy Park Subdivision Master Plan (1928 to 1929).

== Career ==
For the next decade Sturtevant’s practice flourished. A recommendation from architect Carl Gould lead to Sturtevant’s design for the New Rose Garden at Butchart Gardens, in Victoria, British Columbia from 1928 to 1930; and a courtyard garden at the Children’s Orthopedic Hospital, in Seattle from 1930 to 1931, (no longer extant). Gould, who was the key figure in the creation of the 1915 Regents Plan that forever shaped the University of Washington campus, also recommended Sturtevant for the campus landscape architect position, which he held from 1931 to 1939. Using Works Progress Administration (WPA) funds, Sturtevant directed nearly 900 laborers to re-work portions of the campus master plan and landscape around new construction projects, including the plantings around Anderson Hall from 1931 to 1932, the construction of a new 2-½ acre herbal garden from 1934 to 1936, the reconstruction of Rainier Vista from 1935 to 1937, the renovation of Drumheller Fountain from 1935 to 1936, and the planting of cedar trees on Stevens Way in 1938.

Beginning in 1931, Sturtevant served as the campus landscape architect for Principia College, a small Christian Science school in Elsah, Illinois, where he was responsible for both the planning and landscape architecture. Land for the campus was purchased from the previous owner, wealthy St. Louisan, Lucy V. Semple Ames. Notchcliff, the original Ames mansion, had burned in 1911, and in November 1930 the Principia Corporation purchased the spectacular bluff land along the Mississippi River.

Bernard Maybeck and his successor, Henry Gutterson were the principal architects at Principia. The Sturtevant relationship with Maybeck was tumultuous, and the client had to beg Maybeck to continue working with Sturtevant, acknowledging that Sturtevant was “tactless and impulsive and has not always remembered that we began with the definite understanding that the architect was to have general supervision of the landscape plans,” but noting that Sturtevant was enthusiastic and "unquestionably in love with his work here." Maybeck completed his portion of the commission, leaving Sturtevant to work on various campus projects until 1969.

Sturtevant’s work at the Frederick Remington Green Garden in the Highlands neighborhood in Seattle from 1931 to 1933; and the William O. McKay Roof Garden in Seattle from 1931 to 1932 established his reputation as a residential landscape designer. His 1936-37 design for the Ambrose Patterson Garden in Seattle was shown as Seattle’s first modern garden, at the San Francisco Museum of Art’s exhibition, "Contemporary Landscape Architecture and Its Sources." He collaborated with J. Lister Holmes on the Arnold Dessau house in the Highlands neighborhood in Seattle from 1937 to 1939, to "bring the outdoors inside." Across the road, another project, the Paul Piggott residence (formerly Norcliffe), from 1943 to 1945; included a cliffside pool; unique in the Northwest. Sturtevant, while working around the country, maintained an office in Elsah, Illinois. From 1931 to 1940, he kept a desk in Thomas Church’s San Francisco office. When in the Bay Area, Sturtevant led the design of the 1935 and 1936 California Spring Garden Shows. He also involved in the landscape design of the 1939 Golden Gate Exposition on Treasure Island.

In 1941, Sturtevant served as the first president of the San Francisco chapter of the American Society of Landscape Architects. Later that year he joined the U.S. Army Air Corps, where he served as a Major in the Army Air Force and Chief of their Airport Unit. During this time he formed a partnership with Edwin Grohs. This partnership allowed Sturtevant to work on wartime housing projects such as Yesler Terrance and Holly Park in Seattle. He also contributed to Westpark, Eastpark, and Bremerton Gardens, all in Bremerton while he was laying out military airfields throughout the southern United States.

At the end of the war, Sturtevant opened a San Francisco office under succeeding names: Western Engineers from 1945 to 1946; and Sturtevant & French, from 1946 to 1947. The work during this time emphasized airport design, but only the Portland Airport in Portland, Oregon from 1945 to 1948 can be confirmed. He also began to do larger land planning work, executing master plans for the Pope Estate in Burlingame, California from 1946 to 1947, and the Village of Hana, on the Island of Maui, Hawaii from 1947 to 1949.

== Later years ==
In 1954, Sturtevant moved back to his native Midwest, settling in St. Louis to work on the design of the Principia School campus from 1948 to 1969 for grades K-12. He also executed the American University Campus Master Plan, in Beirut, Lebanon, from 1961 to 1962; worked for John Brown University, in Siloam Springs, Arkansas from 1962 to 1963; and the Mason Woods Development, in St. Louis, Missouri from 1966 to 1969. He fell ill with colon cancer and died at the Christian Science Sanatorium in San Francisco on April 11, 1971.
