= List of shipwrecks in September 1873 =

The list of shipwrecks in September 1873 includes ships sunk, foundered, grounded, or otherwise lost during September 1873.

== 1 September ==
List of shipwrecks: 1 September 1873
Ship	State	Description
Ardent	France	The steamship departed from Kertch, Russia. No further trace, presumed foundered with the loss of all hands.
Breeze	United Kingdom	The barque ran aground at Le Tréport, Seine-Inférieure, France.
Carolas	United Kingdom	The steamship collided with another vessel off the Dudgeon Sandbank, in the North Sea. She was consequently beached at Mundesley, Norfolk. She was on a voyage from Folkestone, Kent to West Hartlepool, County Durham. She was later refloated and towed in to Lowestoft, Suffolk.
Dispatch	United Kingdom	The steamship was driven ashore at Saint-Malo, Ille-et-Vilaine, France.
King Orry	(United Kingdom of Great Britain and Ireland) Isle of Man	An explosion on board the steamship severely injured several people, one seriously. She was on a voyage from Liverpool, Lancashire to Douglas.
Magdala	United Kingdom	The brigantine was driven ashore in Morecambe Bay. She was on a voyage from Barrow-in-Furness, Lancashire to Sydney, Nova Scotia, Canada.
Oleander	United Kingdom	The barque ran aground in the Clyde between Dumbarton and Bowling, Dunbartonshire.
Scott	United Kingdom	The barque ran aground on the Cross Sand, in the North Sea off the coast of Norfolk. She was on a voyage from Sunderland, County Durham to Algiers, Algeria. She was refloated and assisted in to Great Yarmouth, Norfolk.
Young Hunter	United Kingdom	The schooner sank off Fleetwood, Lancashire. Her crew were rescued.

== 2 September ==
List of shipwrecks: 2 September 1873
Ship	State	Description
Francis, and Fountain	United Kingdom	The brigs collided off Robin Hoods Bay, Yorkshire and were both severely damaged. Francis put in to Scarborough, Yorkshire; Foutain was assisted in to Scarborough.
George Canning	United Kingdom	The schooner was run into and sunk off Aldeburgh, Suffolk by the steamship Victoria (Sweden). Her crew were rescued by Victoria. George Canning was on a voyage from London to Stockholm, Sweden.
Young Turk	United States	The barque collided with the steamship Assyria (Italy) and was beached at Gibraltar. Young Turk was on a voyage from Boston, Massachusetts to Gibraltar. She was consequently condemned.

== 3 September ==
List of shipwrecks: 3 September 1873
Ship	State	Description
Antias	United Kingdom	The schooner ran aground on The Shingles, off the Isle of Wight. She was on a voyage from Clackmannan to Plymouth, Devon.
Fountain, and Francis	United Kingdom	The brigs collided in Robin Hoods Bay and were both severely damaged. Fountain was assisted in to Scarborough, Yorkshire and Francis put in to Scarborough.
Henrietta	United Kingdom	The ship put in to Plymouth, Devon in a waterlogged condition. She was on a voyage from Richibucto, New Brunswick, Canada to Hull, Yorkshire.
Hydra, and Rajah	Germany; India	The brig Hydra collided with Rajah in The Downs and was damaged. She was on a voyage from London, United Kingdom to Surinam. She was consequently towed in to Ramsgate, Kent, United Kingdom by Rajah, which was severely damaged. Rajah was on a voyage from London to Madras.

== 4 September ==
List of shipwrecks: 4 September 1873
Ship	State	Description
Alexander	Russia	The steamship caught fire. She was on a voyage from Hankou to Shanghai, China.
Antias	United Kingdom	The schooner ran aground on The Shingles, off the Isle of Wight. She was on a voyage from Clackmannan to Plymouth, Devon.
Etna	France	The schooner was driven ashore on "San Carlos Island", Venezuela, in Lake Maracaibo. She was on a voyage from Marseille, Bouches-du-Rhône to Maracaibo.
Germania	United Kingdom	The schooner was abandoned in the North Sea. Her crew were rescued by Laura (Denmark). Germania was on a voyage from Grangemouth, Stirlingshire, United Kingdom to Rostock.
Jane and Harriet	United Kingdom	The brig was driven ashore and wrecked on Cross Island, Maine, United States.
Konkordia	Norway	The barque ran aground and capsized at Pembroke, United Kingdom.
Lothair	United Kingdom	The schooner was driven ashore and wrecked on "San Carlos Island".
Madras	United Kingdom	The steamship ran aground off Three Chimneys Head, China. She was on a voyage from Hong Kong to Yokohama, Japan. She was refloated but was found to be leaky and was beached at Shantou. All on board survived.
May Queen	United Kingdom	The fishing smack was run into by the smack Vivid (United Kingdom) and sank in the North Sea 25 nautical miles (46 km) off Flamborough Head, Yorkshire.

== 5 September ==
List of shipwrecks: 5 September 1873
Ship	State	Description
Agra	United Kingdom	The steamship struck a rock and sank at Galle, Ceylon with the loss of one life. She was on a voyage from Calcutta, India to London.
Catherine	United Kingdom	The ship was driven ashore at Peterhead, Aberdeenshire.
Era	United Kingdom	The brig ran aground on the Holm Sand, in the North Sea off the coast of Suffolk. She was on a voyage from South Shields, County Durham to Rochester, Kent. She was refloated but consequently foundered.
Triton	United Kingdom	The barque was wrecked at the Mumbles, Glamorgan with the loss of two of her eight crew. Survivors were rescued by the Swansea Lifeboat Digby Grand ( Royal National Lifeboat Institution). Triton was on a voyage from Runcorn, Cheshire to a Baltic port.
Winifred	United Kingdom	The ship was severely damaged at Peterhead.

== 6 September ==
List of shipwrecks: 6 September 1873
Ship	State	Description
De Geer	Netherlands	The ship departed from Baltimore, Maryland, United States for Queenstown, County Cork, United Kingdom. No further trace, presumed foundered with the loss of all hands.
Dundyvan	United Kingdom	The schooner sprang a leak and was beached at Kingscross, Isle of Arran. She was on a voyage from Irvine, Ayrshire to Lamlash, Isle of Arran.
Marie Rose	United Kingdom	The ship foundered 60 nautical miles (110 km) south south east of Saint Pierre and Miquelon. Her crew were rescued.
Unnamed	United Kingdom	The wherry collided with a steamship and sank in the River Tyne with the loss of a crew member.

== 7 September ==
List of shipwrecks: 7 September 1873
Ship	State	Description
Cid	Spain	The steamship sprang a leak and became waterlogged at Santander. She was on a voyage from Havre de Grâce, Seine-Inférieure to Havana, Cuba.
Louisa Brown	United Kingdom	The schooner foundered off Green Island. Her crew were rescued. She was on a voyage from Saint John's to a port in Labrador, Newfoundland Colony.
Pride of Anglesea	United Kingdom	The ship struck a rock off Start Point, Devon and became leaky. She was on a voyage from Liverpool, Lancashire to Calais, France.

== 8 September ==
List of shipwrecks: 8 September 1873
Ship	State	Description
Friederich der Grosse	Germany	The brig was driven ashore at Bristol, Gloucestershire, United Kingdom. She was on a voyage from Arkhangelsk, Russia to Gloucester. She was refloated the next day and found to be leaky.
St. Anne	France	The schooner was wrecked at the mouth of the Caravelas River, Brazil.
Wells Packet	United Kingdom	The schooner ran aground on the Brake Sand. She was refloated and assisted in to Ramsgate, Kent in a leaky condition.
Zanoni	United Kingdom	The ship was driven ashore at Merigomish, Nova Scotia, Canada. She was on a voyage from Liverpool, Lancashire to Prince Edward Island, Canada. She was refloated in late September.

== 9 September ==
List of shipwrecks: 9 September 1873
Ship	State	Description
Admiral	United States	The brigantine was driven ashore and wrecked at Osaka, Japan.
Black Duck	United Kingdom	The steamship was wrecked on the Gunfleet Sand, in the North Sea off the coast of Essex. Her crew survived. She was on a voyage from Newcastle upon Tyne, Northumberland to London.
Volunteer	United Kingdom	The schooner ran aground in the Sound of Islay. She was refloated the next day.

== 10 September ==
List of shipwrecks: 10 September 1873
Ship	State	Description
Kestrel	New Zealand	The 20-ton ketch went aground and was wrecked at Port Underwood in the Marlborough Sounds in a gale.
Orrell	United Kingdom	The schooner was wrecked off the Bar Lightship ( Trinity House), at the mouth of the River Mersey with the loss of four of her five crew. The survivor was rescued by the steamship Voltaic (United Kingdom). Orrell was on a voyage from Saint-Valery-sur-Somme, Somme, France to Garston, Lancashire.
Prudence	United Kingdom	The schooner ran aground on the Burbo Bank, in Liverpool Bay. Her three crew were rescued by the steamship Virago (United Kingdom).

== 11 September ==
List of shipwrecks: 11 September 1873
Ship	State	Description
Amadeo	United Kingdom	The ship was driven ashore on Masbate Island, Spanish East Indies. Her crew were rescued. She was on a voyage from "Vicilio" to Zebu, Spanish East Indies.
Calsow Stetsow	United States	The ship foundered with the loss of all but four of her crew. She was on a voyage from New York to Constantinople, Ottoman Empire.
Hudson	United Kingdom	The full-rigged ship was driven ashore at Dover, Kent. She was on a voyage from London to Adelaide, South Australia or vice versa. She was refloated and resumed her voyage.

== 12 September ==
List of shipwrecks: 12 September 1873
Ship	State	Description
African Belle	United Kingdom	The brigantine was wrecked at the mouth of the Kowie River.
Alice	United Kingdom	The ship departed from Glasgow, Renfrewshire for "Windes". No further trace, presumed foundered with the loss of all hands.
Elizabeth	United Kingdom	The ship was driven ashore at Groomsport, County Down. She was on a voyage from a port in North America to Belfast, County Antrim. She was refloated.
Princess Beatrice	United Kingdom	The ship foundered in the Philippine Sea. Her crew were rescued by a pilot boat. She was on a voyage from Newport, Monmouthshire to Yokohama, Japan.
Russia	United States	The steamship collided with the steamship John A. Dix (United States). She was on a voyage from Chicago, Illinois to Buffalo, New York. She was repaired and returned to service.

== 13 September ==
List of shipwrecks: 13 September 1873
Ship	State	Description
Coquette	(United Kingdom of Great Britain and Ireland) Isle of Man	The schooner foundered off Ballure Head with the loss of one of her three crew. She was on a voyage from Ramsey to Workington, Cumberland.
Hero	United Kingdom	The smack was driven ashore and wrecked at Douglas, Isle of Man with the loss of three of her eight crew. She was on a voyage from Douglas to Maryport, Cumberland.
Ocean	United Kingdom	The smack ran aground at Cardigan. Her two crew were rescued by the Coastguard.
Rebecca	United Kingdom	The ship was lost near the mouth of the "Middleton River", on the west coast of Africa. She was on a voyage from Liverpool, Lancashire to Africa.

== 14 September ==
List of shipwrecks: 14 September 1873
Ship	State	Description
Addie Osburn	United States	The schooner was run into by the steamship Precursor (United Kingdom) and sank in the Atlantic Ocean (45°27′N 54°55′W) with the loss of twelve of her fifteen crew. Survivors were rescued by Precursor.
St. Mungo	United Kingdom	The ship was destroyed by fire at sea. Her crew were rescued. She was on a voyage from Dundee, Forfarshire to Galle, Ceylon.

== 15 September ==
List of shipwrecks: 15 September 1873
Ship	State	Description
Alice	United Kingdom	The schooner was wrecked on the East Hoyle Bank, in Liverpool Bay with the loss of all four crew.
Amazon	Sweden	The schooner was wrecked on the Goodwin Sands, Kent, United Kingdom. All thirteen people on board were rescued by the Ramsgate Lifeboat Bradford ( Royal National Lifeboat Institution). Amazon was on a voyage from Pugwash, Nova Scotia, Canada to Grimsby, Lincolnshire, United Kingdom. Five Broadstairs boatmen subsequently boarded the wreck and were unable to leave due to sea conditions. They were rescued by the North Deal Lifeboat.
Wyoming	United Kingdom	The steamship ran aground off Cape Sable Island, Nova Scotia, Canada. She was on a voyage from New York, United States to Liverpool, Lancashire. She was refloated and resumed her voyage in a leaky condition, arriving at Liverpool on 2 October.
Union	Leeward Islands	The steam yacht ran aground on the Rat Rocks, Antigua. She was refloated.
Zoe	France	The brig was wrecked on the Horse Bank, in the Irish Sea off the coast of Lancashire, United Kingdom. Her eight crew were rescued by the yacht Marco Polo (United Kingdom). Zoe was on a voyage from Workington, Cumberland to Liverpool, Lancashire.

== 16 September ==
List of shipwrecks: 16 September 1873
Ship	State	Description
Dhoolia	United Kingdom	The steamship was driven ashore at Ras Ghareb, Egypt. All 84 people on board survived. She was on a voyage from London to Colombo, Ceylon and Calcutta and/or Madras, India. Dhoolia was refloated on 16 November and taken in to Suez, Egypt for temporary repairs. She was towed to Port Said, Egypt in April 1874 for further repairs, which were completed in May.
Ganges	United Kingdom	The steamship was driven ashore at Fort Charles, Quebec, Canada. She was on a voyage from Sydney, Nova Scotia to Montreal, Quebec. She was refloated on 6 October and taken in to Quebec City.
Ironsides	United States	The steamship foundered in Lake Michigan 7 nautical miles (13 km) off Grand Haven, Michiganwith the loss of seventeen of the 49 people on board.
Walamo	United Kingdom	The steamship was holed by her cargo of armoured plates piercing her hull and foundered in the Dogger Bank. Her 33 crew were rescued by a smack. She was on a voyage from Kingston upon Hull, Yorkshire to Kronstadt, Russia.

== 17 September ==
List of shipwrecks: 17 September 1873
Ship	State	Description
Costa Rica	United States	The steamship was wrecked at Point Diablo, California with the loss of one life. She was on a voyage form Honolulu, Kingdom of Hawaii to San Francisco, California. She was refloated in October and towed in to San Francisco.
Jules and Louis	France	The ship was lost at "They-de-Bereile". Her rew were rescued.
Pitfound	United Kingdom	The barque was wrecked off Cape St. Vincent, Portugal. Her crew were rescued. She was on a voyage from St. Davids, Pembrokeshire to Patras, Greece.
Squire	United Kingdom	The ship was lost in the Bay of Couche. She was on a voyage from Santander, Spain to Newport, Monmouthshire.

== 18 September ==
List of shipwrecks: 18 September 1873
Ship	State	Description
Canadian	United Kingdom	The steamship was driven ashore on Inchcolm, Fife.
Daphne	United Kingdom	The yacht was driven ashore at the mouth of the River Lochy. She was refloated with assistance from the steamship Pioneer (United Kingdom).
Hilton Philipson	United Kingdom	The steamship foundered in the Bay of Biscay with the loss of one of her 24 crew. Twenty-one survivors were rescued by the schooner Courier, two by the steamship Lady Anne (both United Kingdom). Hilton Philipson was on a voyage from Sulina, Ottoman Empire to Antwerp, Belgium.
Robert Pow	United Kingdom	The paddle tug sank at North Shields, Northumberland. She was later refloated.
Wanderer	United Kingdom	The brig was wrecked on Bornholm, Denmark. Her nine crew were rescued. She was on a voyage from Leith, Lothian to Danzig, Germany.
Willie	United Kingdom	The ship departed from Saint Petersburg, Russia for Dunkirk, Nord, France. No further trace, presumed foundered with the loss of all hands.
Unnamed	United Kingdom	The lighter was wrecked at Anstruther, Fife.
Unnamed	United Kingdom	The fishing vessel foundered off Fraserburgh, Aberdeenshire. Her crew survived.

== 19 September ==
List of shipwrecks: 19 September 1873
Ship	State	Description
City of Richmond	United Kingdom	The full-rigged ship was severely damaged by fire at South Shields, County Durham.
Clara Louisa	United Kingdom	The ship was holed by her anchor and sank at Penarth, Glamorgan. She was on a voyage from Cardiff, Glamorgan to A Coruña, Spain.
Herald	United Kingdom	The ship foundered at sea. She was on a voyage from Liverpool, Lancashire to Matamoros, Mexico.
Waverley	United Kingdom	The ship was destroyed by fire in the Indian Ocean. Her crew were rescued by President v. Ryckevors (Flag unknown). Waverley was on a voyage from South Shields to Singapore, Straits Settlements.

== 20 September ==
List of shipwrecks: 20 September 1873
Ship	State	Description
Jessie	United Kingdom	The steamship foundered off the Isle of May, Fife. Her crew survived. She was on a voyage from South Shields, County Durham to Perth.
Joven Angelia	Spain	The barque collided with the steamship Express (Italy) and sank. Her crew were rescued.
Lizzie	United Kingdom	The steamship was driven ashore and wrecked at Whitley, Northumberland. Her thirteen crew were rescued by the Cullercoats Lifeboat Palmerston ( Royal National Lifeboat Institution). She was on a voyage from Dunkirk, Nord, France to Blyth, Northumberland. She was refloated in early October and taken in to South Shields, County Durham.
Marseille	France	The tug suffered a boiler explosion and sank off Marseille, Bouches-du-Rhône with the loss of two of her three crew. The survivors was rescued by a steamship.
North Star	United Kingdom	The fishing smack was driven ashore and wrecked on Westray, Orkney Islands. Her crew were rescued.
Nouvel	Norway	The brig was abandoned in the Dogger Bank before 17 September. She was on a voyage from Hull to Brevig.
Pero	United Kingdom	The brig was run down and sunk in the River Thames by a steamship. Her crew were rescued. She was on a voyage from London to Newcastle upon Tyne, Northumberland.
Reward	(United Kingdom of Great Britain and Ireland) Guernsey	The brig was run down and sunk at South Shields, County Durham by the steamship Camilla (France). Her crew survived.
Tovro	Flag unknown	The ship was abandoned at the entrance to "The Sleeve". Her crew were rescued by a brig.
Wilhelm	Germany	The ship was wrecked at Hasle, Bornholm, Denmark. She was on a voyage from Granton, Lothian, United Kingdom to Riga, Russia.

== 21 September ==
List of shipwrecks: 21 September 1873
Ship	State	Description
Delta	United Kingdom	The steamship was driven ashore on "Albinsholm", off the Packerort Lighthouse, Russia. Her crew were rescued by the steamship Astarte (United Kingdom). Delta was on a voyage from Kronstadt, Russia to London. She broke up during a storm which lasted from 10–13 October.
Diedrich	Germany	The ship was driven ashore near Lemvig, Norway. Her crew were rescued. She was on a voyage from a Norwegian port to the Wester.
Josephine	United Kingdom	The steamship sprang a leak and was abandoned in the Atlantic Ocean. Her crew were rescued by the barque Mora (United Kingdom). Josephine was on a voyage from Trinidad to Greenock, Renfrewshire.
Rivoli	United Kingdom	The barque was wrecked on Duck Island, Newfoundland Colony. Her crew were rescued.
Unnamed	Flag unknown	The brig foundered off "Waderon" with the loss of all hands.

== 22 September ==
List of shipwrecks: 22 September 1873
Ship	State	Description
Anna Charlotte	United Kingdom	The ship was wrecked at Lemvig, Norway. Her crew were rescued. She was on a voyage from Memel, Germany to Ipswich, Suffolk.
Anna	United Kingdom	The ship ran aground at Helsingør, Denmark. She was on a voyage from Stettin, Germany to Sunderland, County Durham. She was refloated and taken in to Helsingør in a leaky condition.
Esmerelda	Spain	The steamship was wrecked 67 nautical miles (124 km) from Manila, Spanish East Indies.
Esperanza	Spain	The brig was driven ashore at Terneuzen, Zeeland, Netherlands. She was on a voyage from Havana, Cuba to Ghent, East Flanders, Belgium.
Friedrich Ludwig	Germany	The brig was wrecked. Her crew were rescued. She was on a voyage from Grimsby, Lincolnshire, United Kingdom to Riga, Russia.
Hermann	Germany	The ship was wrecked at Lemvig. Her crew were rescued. She was on a voyage from Arendal, Norway to Papenburg.
Hilda	United Kingdom	The steamship was driven ashore and wrecked on the Russian coast. Her crew were rescued over the next two days.
John Lightfoot	United Kingdom	The ship collided with Liberté (France) and ran aground on the Pineall Bank. John Lightfoot was on a voyage from Nantes, Loire-Inférieure to Preston, Lancashire. She was refloated and taken in to Saint-Nazaire, Ille-et-Vilaine.
Leif	Norway	The steamship was destroyed by fire at Tromsø. Subsequently repaired and returned to service.
Solid	Denmark	The ship was wrecked on Amrum, Germany. Her crew were rescued. She was on a voyage from Plymouth, Devon, United Kingdom to Fanø.
Sophia	Denmark	The yacht collided with another vessel and foundered off Skagen, Denmark. Her crew were rescued. She was on a voyage from Hull, Yorkshire, United Kingdom to Middelfart.

== 23 September ==
List of shipwrecks: 23 September 1873
Ship	State	Description
Alexander von Humboldt	Germany	The barque was wrecked on Læsø, Denmark.
Aquila	United Kingdom	The steamship sprang a leak and sank at Skutskär, Sweden. She was later refloated and taken in to Stockholm, where she was taken in to drydock for repairs on 20 October.
Emanuel	Germany	The schooner collided with Julia Alida (United Kingdom) and was abandoned by her crew, who were rescued. Emanuel was on a voyage from Christiania to Papenburg.
Herbert Graham	United Kingdom	The barque was destroyed by fire 30 nautical miles (56 km) off Santa Cruz de Tenerife, Canary Islands. Her ten crew were rescued by RMS Cuzco (United Kingdom). Herbert Graham was on a voyage from Newport, Monmouthshire to Valparaíso, Chile.
Hermine	Germany	The schooner was run into by the steamship Peter Graham (United Kingdom) and sank in Snodsborg Sound. Hermine was on a voyage from Newcastle upon Tyne, Northumberland, United Kingdom to Königsberg.
Livorno	United Kingdom	The steamship ran aground on the Goodwin Sands, Kent, United Kingdom. She was on a voyage from South Shields, County Durham, United Kingdom to Genoa. She was refloated and resumed her voyage.
Ottawa	New Zealand	The 222-ton brigantine struck rocks and foundered southwest of New Plymouth while en route from Kaipara Harbour to Lyttelton Harbour with a cargo of timber. All hands were rescued.
Robert Morrison	United Kingdom	The ship was driven ashore at Newcastle, New South Wales and was abandoned by her crew. She was on a voyage from London to Fremantle, Western Australia.
Vanguard	United Kingdom	The ship sprang a leak and was beached at Wusong, China. She was on a voyage from London to Yokohama, Japan. She was later refloated with the assistance of a steamship.

== 24 September ==
List of shipwrecks: 24 September 1873
Ship	State	Description
Alliance	(United Kingdom of Great Britain and Ireland) Jersey	The steamship struck a rock and foundered 3 nautical miles (5.6 km) off "Ballepitty", Ceylon. Three of her crew were reported missing.
Anna Maria	Germany	The brigantine was driven ashore and wrecked at "Cannavieras".
Broomhaugh	United Kingdom	The steamship suffered an onboard explosion within 100 nautical miles (190 km) of Gibraltar with the loss of four of her crew and five severely injured. She was on a voyage from Cardiff, Glamorgan to Port Said, Egypt. She put in to Gibraltar.
Duke of Argyle	United Kingdom	The steamship ran aground on the Ship Rock, off the coast of County Down. She was on a voyage from Dublin to Glasgow, Renfrewshire. She was refloated.
Woodville	United Kingdom	The schooner ran aground and sank in the Farne Islands, Northumberland. Her crew were rescued.

== 25 September ==
List of shipwrecks: 25 September 1873
Ship	State	Description
Finto	United Kingdom	The ship caught fire at Stanley, Falkland Islands and was scuttled. She was on a voyage from Swansea, Glamorgan to Valparaíso, Chile. She was refloated and placed under repair.
John Bunyan	United Kingdom	The ship departed from "Doboy" for Liverpool, Lancashire. No further trace, presumed foundered with the loss of all hands.
Julia Augusta	Malta	The barque arrived at Constantinople, Ottoman Empire on fire. She was on a voyage from Liverpool to Constantinople.
Magnet	United Kingdom	The ship sprang a leak and foundered off Montevideo, Uruguay. She was on a voyage from Buenos Aires, Argentina to Mauritius.
Tinto	United Kingdom	The ship caught fire at Stanley, Falkland Islands and was scuttled.
Walter Stanhope	United Kingdom	The steamship ran aground in the River Ouse at Goole, Yorkshire.

== 26 September ==
List of shipwrecks: 26 September 1873
Ship	State	Description
Charlotte	United Kingdom	The ship was driven ashore and wrecked near Maule, Chile. She was on a voyage from Liverpool, Lancashire to Valparaíso, Chile.
RMS Cotopaxi	United Kingdom	The steamship ran aground at Morro, São Paulo, Brazil. She was on a voyage from Callao, Peru to Liverpool. Her passengers were taken off by the flagship USS Lancaster (United States Navy). Cotopaxi was refloated and taken in to Bahia, Brazil, where she arrived the next day.
Oste	Germany	The schooner collided with the barque Peleg (Austria-Hungary) and foundered with the loss of a crew member.

== 27 September ==
List of shipwrecks: 27 September 1873
Ship	State	Description
Gino	Italy	The brig was wrecked near Brindisi. She was on a voyage from Brindisi to Bordeaux, Gironde, France.
Pelaya	Spain	The steamship ran aground at Ouessant, Finistère, France. She was on a voyage from London, United Kingdom to Santander. She was refloated.
Prins Hendrik	Netherlands	The steamship was wrecked in the Brothers Islands, Egypt. All on board were rescued. She was on a voyage from Java, Netherlands East Indies to a Dutch port.
Rosina	United Kingdom	The ship departed from Pensacola, Florida for Liverpool, Lancashire. No further trace, presumed foundered with the loss of all hands.

== 28 September ==
List of shipwrecks: 28 September 1873
Ship	State	Description
Eulalie	France	The ship sank at Jacmel, Haiti in a hurricane with some loss of life.
Isabella	Barbados	The ship sank at Jacmel in a hurricane with the loss of a crew member.
Scotia	United Kingdom	The schooner was wrecked on the Great Burbo Bank, in Liverpool Bay. Her four crew were rescued by the Formby Lifeboat.
Teresa de Pavia	Italy	The ship sank at Jacmel in a hurricane with some loss of life.
Whydah	(United Kingdom of Great Britain and Ireland) Jersey	The schooner was wrecked on the Flower Rocks, off the coast of the Newfoundland Colony. Her crew were rescued. She was on a voyage from Montreal, Quebec, Canada to Queenstown, County Cork.
29th of October, 1867	Leeward Islands	The schooner sank in a hurricane 27 nautical miles (50 km) off Saletrou, Haiti with the loss of all but one of the twelve people on board. She was on a voyage from Saint Thomas, Virgin Islands to Jacmel, Haiti.

== 29 September ==
List of shipwrecks: 29 September 1873
Ship	State	Description
Mary Grace	United States	The ship was driven ashore on Cross Islands, Massachusetts. She was on a voyage from Boston, Massachusetts to Parrsboro, Nova Scotia, Canada.
Ville de Lisbonne	France	The steamship was wrecked 10 nautical miles (19 km) north of Porto, Portugal. All on board were rescued. She was on a voyage from Havre de Grâce, Seine-Inférieure to Porto.

== 30 September ==
List of shipwrecks: 30 September 1873
Ship	State	Description
Golden Dream	United Kingdom	The clipper was abandoned in the Atlantic Ocean. Her crew were rescued by the brig Barbarossa (Italy). Golden Dream was on a voyage from Pensacola, Florida to Liverpool, Lancashire.
Penrith Castle	United Kingdom	The smack collided with the paddle steamer Great Western (United Kingdom) and sank off St. Anne's Head, Pembrokeshire with the loss of one of her two crew. The survivor was rescued by Great Western.
Severn	United Kingdom	The ship was driven ashore at Colón, United States of Colombia. She was on a voyage from Savanilla, Cuba to Colón. She was refloated.

== Unknown date ==
List of shipwrecks: Unknown date in September 1873
Ship	State	Description
Albert Auguste, and Dan	France; Norway	The sloop Albert Auguste collided with the brig Danand sank in the English Channel off Fécamp, Seine-Inférieure. She was on a voyage from Dunkirk, Nord to Havre de Grâce, Seine-Inférieure. Dan was on a voyage from Rouen, Seine-Inférieur to Nyland, Sweden. She was severely damaged and put back in to Havre de Grâce in a severely leaky condition.
Anna Maria, and Hoppal	Sweden	The schooners collided and were both severely damaged. They were towed in to Kalmar for repairs.
Avenir	France	The barque sank in the Danube. She was later refloated.
Brownlow	United Kingdom	The steamship foundered in the North Sea 90 nautical miles (170 km) off Spurn Point, Yorkshire. All 37 people on board took to a boat; they were rescued by the steamship Pallas (Flag unknown ). Brownlow was on a voyage from Kingston upon Hull, Yorkshire to Kronstadt, Russia.
Constance	United Kingdom	The ship was driven ashore at Quebec City. She was refloated on 24 September and found to be waterlogged. She was placed under repair.
Doornkaat, and Flora	Flags unknown	The steamship Doornkaat collided with Flora and sank off "Tolbuken", Russia. Flora was on a voyage from Kronstadt, Russia to Sundsvall, Sweden. She put back to Kronstadt in a leaky condition.
Ernest Jones	United Kingdom	The ship was wrecked on the North Danger Reef, off the coast of New York, United States. She was on a voyage from Singapore, Straits Settlements to the English Channel.
Evening Star	United Kingdom	The ship was abandoned at sea before 19 September. Her crew were rescued. She was on a voyage from Moulmein, Burma to Bombay, India.
Felix	Netherlands	The ship was wrecked on Amrum, Germany. She was on a voyage from Kotka, Grand Duchy of Finland to Harlingen, Friesland.
Freya	Norway	The schooner was abandoned on or before 21 September. Her crew were rescued. She was on a voyage from Sunderland, County Durham, United Kingdom to Kristiansand.
Gamma	United Kingdom	The steamship ran aground at "Cape La Roche" before 10 September. She was on a voyage from Waterford to Montreal, Quebec, Canada. She was refloated and put in to Quebec City.
Gem	United Kingdom	The ship was driven ashore at Wexford. Her five crew were rescued by the Wexford Lifeboat Civil Service ( Royal National Lifeboat Institution). Gem was on a voyage from Ayr to Wexford.
Girolano	Italy	The ship was wrecked near Šibenik, Kingdom of Dalmatia. She was on a voyage from Civita Vecchia to Venice.
Helen	United States	The ship was wrecked on Hog Island, Philadelphia, Pennsylvania, United States.
Immature	Germany	The derelict schooner was towed in to Gothenburg, Sweden. She had been on a voyage Christiania, Norway to Papenburg.
Indus	India	The ship was lost with the loss of at least 418 lives.
James Baldine	United States	The ship was abandoned in a waterlogged condition before 6 September.
James Howard	United States	The steamboat was destroyed by fire at Commerce, Missouri.
James Jardine	United Kingdom	The ship was abandoned in the Atlantic Ocean. Her crew were rescued by Lake Erie (United States). James Jardine was on a voyage from Quebec City to Liverpool, Lancashire.
Johan Wilhelm	Germany	The schooner ran aground on the Bokkegat, off the coast of Zeeland, Netherlands. She was on a voyage from Rotterdam, South Holland, Netherlands to New York, United States. She was refloated and towed in to Brouwershaven, Zeeland in a leaky condition.
Kwangchow	Flag unknown	The steamship was wrecked east of Cape Guardafui, Majeerteen Sultanate. Her crew survived.
Lenore	United Kingdom	The ship was wrecked at "Port Merigonish". She was on a voyage from Liverpool to Prince Edward Island, Canada.
Liberty	United Kingdom	The ship ran aground at Quebec City. She was on a voyage from Glasgow, Renfrewshire to Quebec City. She was refloated and found to be severely leaky.
Margaretha Christensen	Germany	The steamship was wrecked. She was on a voyage from Lubawa, Courland Governorate to Stettin and/or Schiedam, South Holland.
Margaret S. Weir	United Kingdom	The ship was driven ashore at Calais, France. She was refloated and towed in to Calais.
Maria Lorentzen	Netherlands	The steamship foundered in the North Sea. Four crew were rescued by the schooner Ottar (Norway), the rest were presumed drowned. Maria Lorentzen was on a voyage from Kronstadt to Rotterdam, South Holland.
Martha	United Kingdom	The schooner ran aground on the Lillegrund, in the Baltic Sea. She was on a voyage from Gävle, Sweden to Aberdovey, Merionethshire.
Mary Ann	United Kingdom	The ship was abandoned at sea. Her crew were rescued. She was on a voyage from Queenstown, County Cork to Miramichi, New Brunswick, Canada.
Mary Stuart	United Kingdom	The steamship was driven ashore and wrecked on Ameland, Friesland, Netherlands with some loss of life. She was on a voyage from Egersund, Norway to Dordrecht, South Holland.
Mary West	United Kingdom	The ship was driven ashore on the coast of Lancashire. She was refloated on 5 September and towed in to Lytham St. Annes.
McLeod	United Kingdom	The ship ran aground on the Romer Shoal. She was on a voyage from Demerara, British Guiana to New York. She was refloated and taken in to New York in a leaky condition.
Medway	United Kingdom	The steamship was wrecked at Anchor Point, Newfoundland Colony with the loss of seven lives. She was on a voyage from Montreal to London.
Milani	Flag unknown	The schooner was wrecked near Gothenburg, Sweden. She was on a voyage from Narva, Russia to Antwerp, Belgium.
Orontes	United Kingdom	The ship was lost.
Osborn and Elizabeth	United Kingdom	The brig, master Wright, was wrecked 10.9 West from Hanko, Grand Duchy of Finland. She was on a voyage from London to Kronstadt.
Radiant	United Kingdom	The ship collided with a Dutch schooner and sank off Seskar, Russia. She was on a voyage from Blyth, Northumberland to Kronstadt.
R. and M. J. Charnley	United Kingdom	The schooner was driven ashore at Harrington, Cumberland before 12 September. She was later refloated.
Rivola	Canada	The ship was wrecked at "Aubasque". She was on a voyage from Barbados to Quebec City.
Panther	United Kingdom	The ship was driven ashore and wrecked at "St. Bardes". She was on a voyage from Montreal to an English port.
Prefet Pron	France	The ship was driven out to sea from the coast of Mexico. No further trace, presumed foundered with the loss of all hands.
Prospero	United Kingdom	The ship was driven ashore and wrecked near Bahia. She was on a voyage from Liverpool to San Francisco.
Resolution	United Kingdom	The fishing smack was wrecked in the Faroe Islands. Her crew survived.
Sheffield	United Kingdom	The ship was sighted off Havana, Cuba on 26 or 28 September whilst on a voyage from Belize City, British Honduras to London. No further trace, presumed foundered with the loss of all hands.
Sirene	France	The schooner collided with the barque Alcyon (United Kingdom) and sank off Penzance, Cornwall, United Kingdom. Her crew were rescued. Sirene was on a voyage from Saint-Malo, Ille-et-Vilaine to Gloucester, United Kingdom.
Sisters	United Kingdom	The barque was driven ashore and wrecked at Lemvig or Laurvig, Norway with the loss of four of her ten crew. She was on a voyage from Bo'ness, Lothian to Kronstadt.
Star	United Kingdom	The ship was wrecked near Lemvig, Norway.
Tagus	United Kingdom	The steamship collided with London Bridge and was beached.
Vorwaerts	Germany	The ship was abandoned at sea. Her crew were rescued. She was on a voyage from New York to Lübeck.
Vrouw Maria	Netherlands	The lighter was run down and sunk by the steamship Maastroom (Netherlands) with some loss of life.
Two unnamed vessels	United Kingdom	The barges collided with Tagus (United Kingdom) and sank in the River Thames near Cannon Street Railway Bridge.
