= Butchart Gardens =

Gardens in Brentwood Bay, British Columbia, Canada

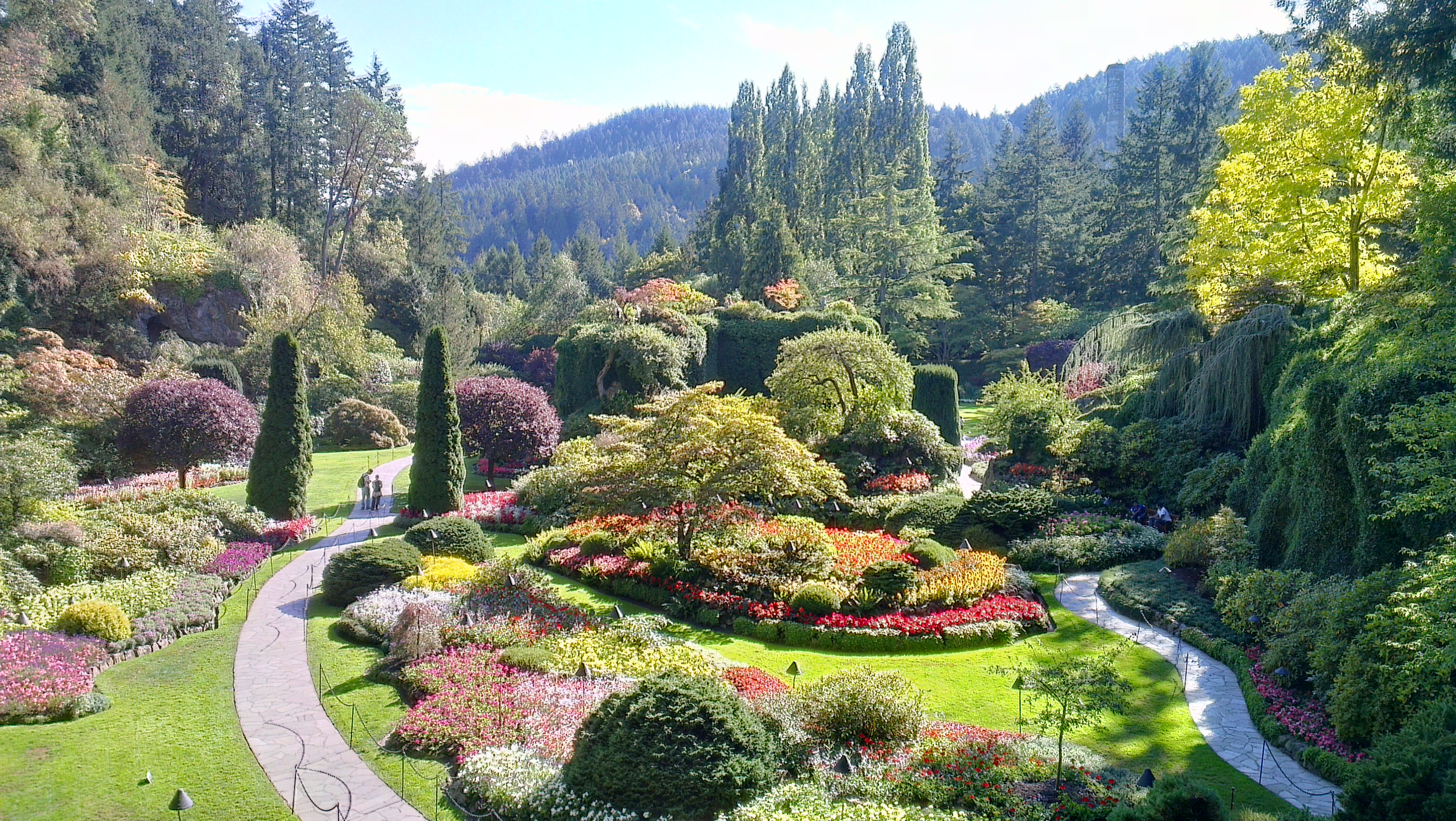
- Sunken Garden

- Location within British Columbia
- Interactive map of Butchart Gardens
- Type: Botanical
- Location: 800 Benvenuto Avenue; Brentwood Bay, British Columbia V8M 1J8
- Coordinates: 48°33′55″N 123°28′10″W
- Area: 22 hectares (54 acres)
- Website: www.butchartgardens.com

National Historic Site of Canada
- Official name: Butchart Gardens National Historic Site of Canada
- Designated: 2004

The Butchart Gardens is a floral display garden in Brentwood Bay, British Columbia, Canada, located near Victoria on Vancouver Island. The gardens receive over a million visitors each year. The gardens have been designated a National Historic Site of Canada.

== History ==
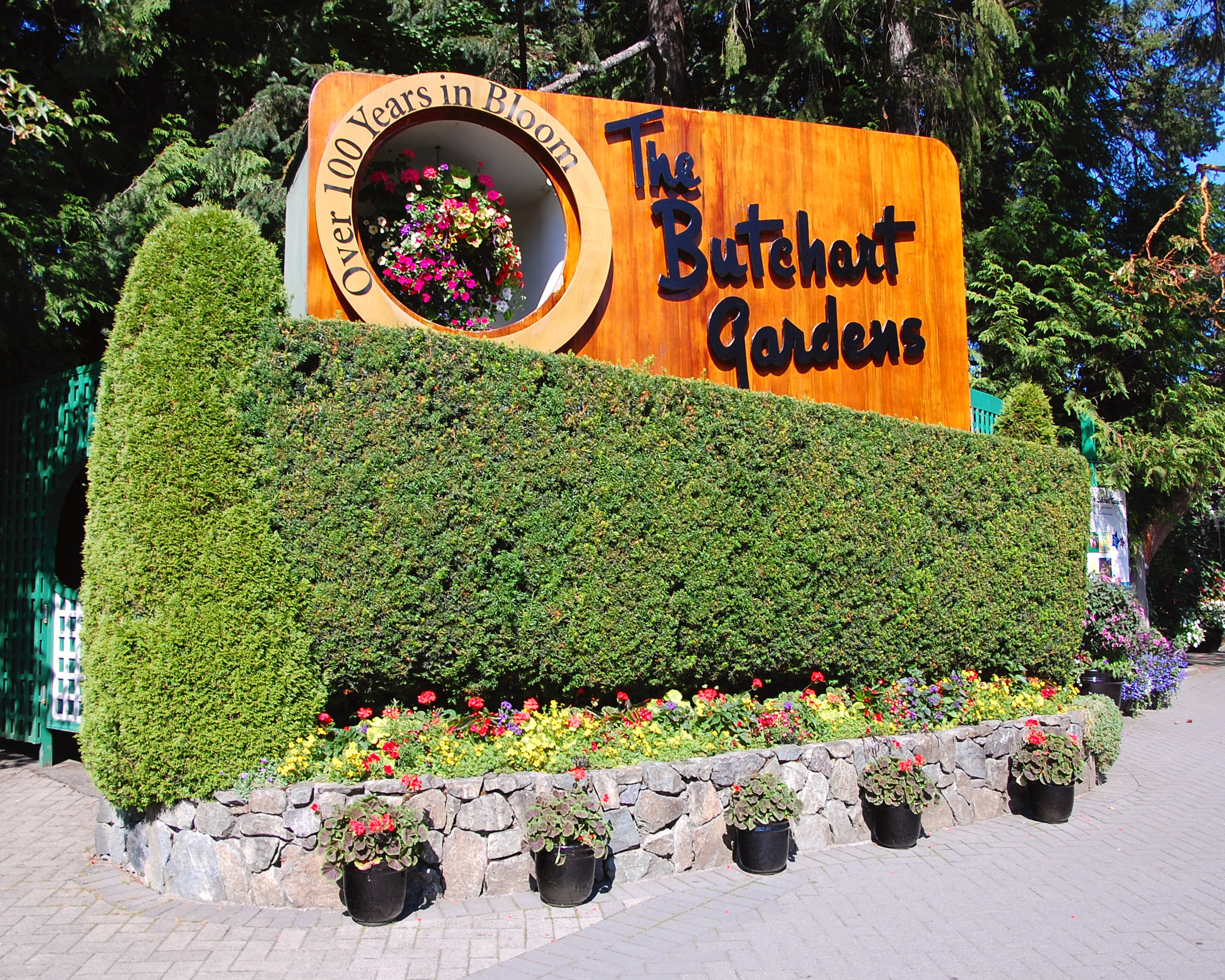
Entrance to the Butchart Gardens

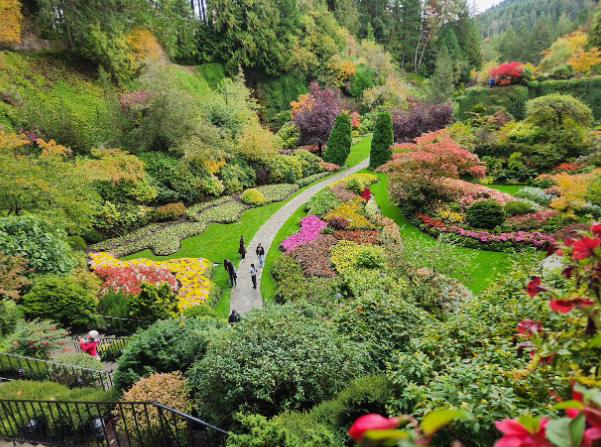
Butchart Garden in Canada 2024

Robert Pim Butchart (1856–1943) began manufacturing Portland cement in 1888 near his birthplace of Owen Sound, Ontario, Canada. He and his wife Jennie Butchart (1866–1950) came to the west coast of Canada because of rich limestone deposits necessary for cement production.

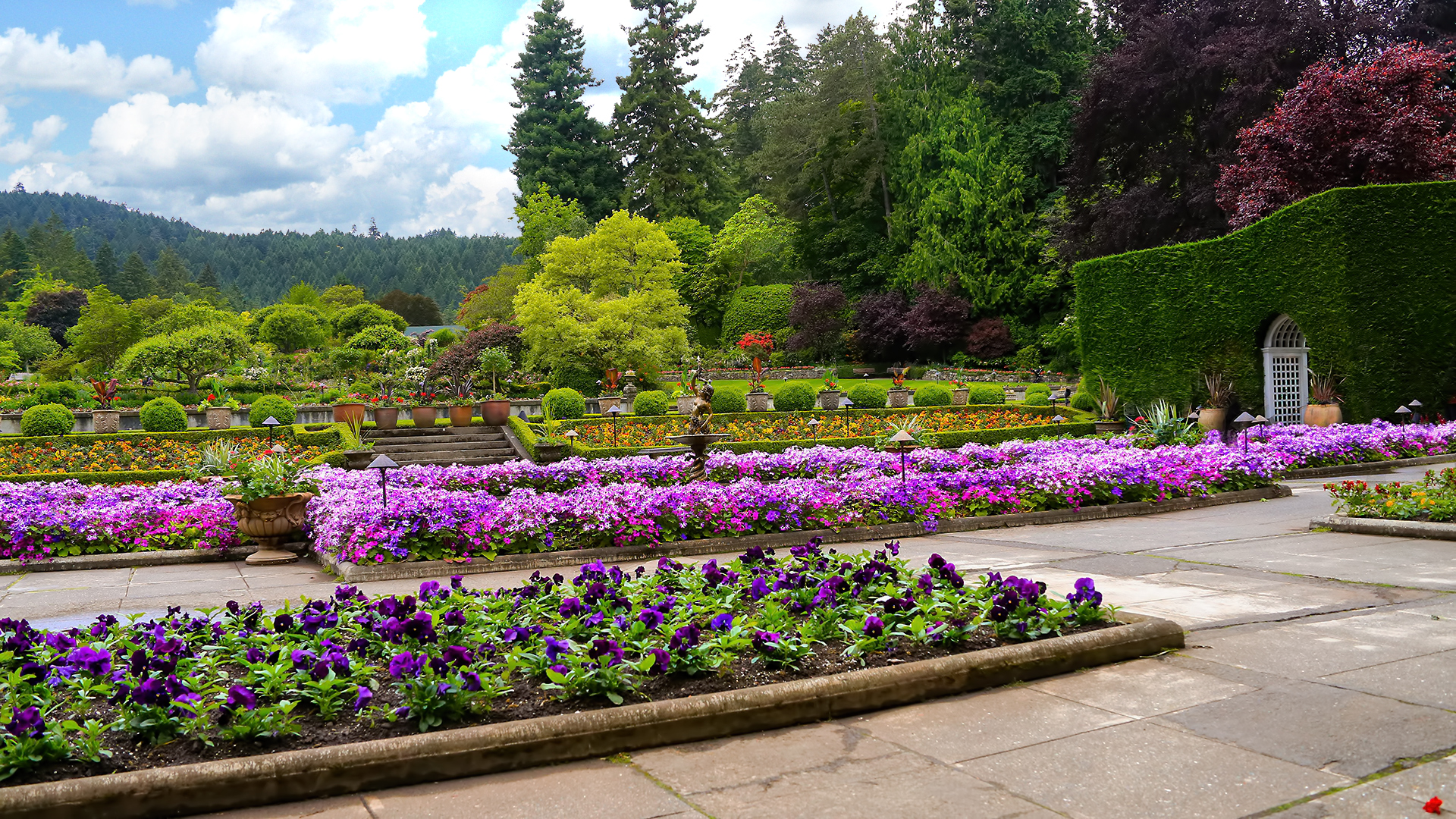
The Italian Garden

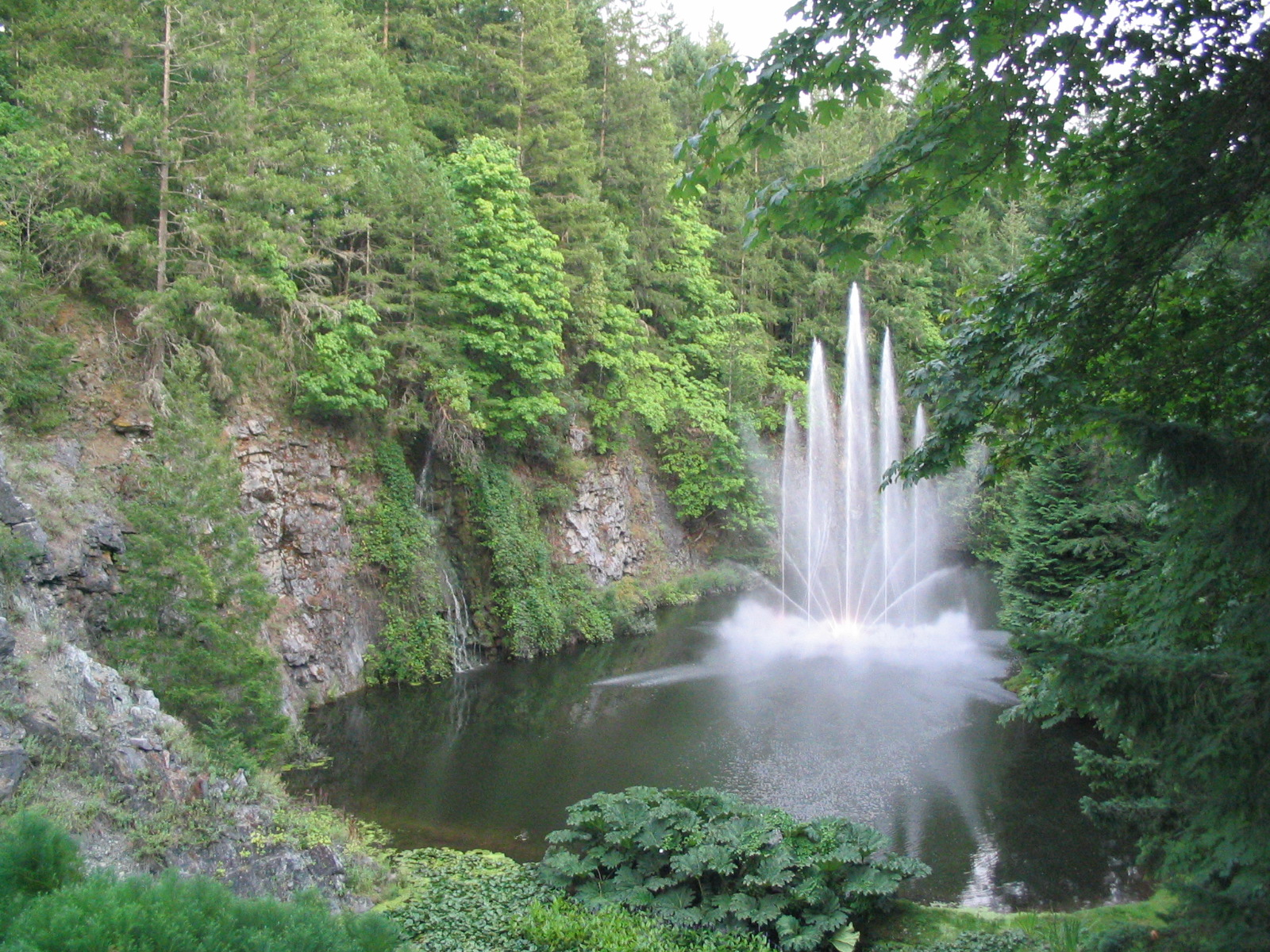
The Ross Fountain

In 1904, they established their home near his quarry on Tod Inlet at the base of the Saanich Peninsula on Vancouver Island.

In 1907 Isaburo Kishida, a sixty-five-year-old garden designer from Yokohama, Japan, came to Victoria at the request of his son to build a tea garden for Esquimalt Gorge Park. This garden was wildly popular. Several prominent citizens, Jennie Butchart among them, commissioned Kishida to build Japanese gardens for their estates before Kishida returned to Japan in 1912.

In 1909, when the limestone quarry was exhausted, Jennie set about turning it into the Sunken Garden, which was completed in 1921. They named their home "Benvenuto" ("welcome" in Italian), and began to receive visitors to their gardens. In 1926, they replaced their tennis courts with an Italian garden and in 1929 they replaced their kitchen vegetable garden with a large rose garden to the design of Butler Sturtevant of Seattle. Samuel Maclure, who was consultant to the Butchart Gardens, reflected the aesthetic of the Renaissance Era and the English Arts and Crafts Movement.

In 1939, the Butcharts gave the Gardens to their grandson Ian Ross (1918–1997) on his 21st birthday. Ross was involved in the operation and promotion of the gardens until his death 58 years later, at which time his son Christopher assumed those responsibilities.

In 1953, miles of underground wiring were laid to provide night illumination, to mark the 50th anniversary of The Gardens. In 1964, the ever-changing Ross Fountain was installed in the lower reservoir to celebrate the 60th anniversary. In 1994, the Canadian Heraldic Authority granted a coat of arms to the Butchart Gardens. In 2004, two 30-foot (9.1 m) totem poles were installed to mark the 100th anniversary, and The Gardens were designated as a national historic site of Canada.

Ownership of The Gardens remains within the Butchart family; the owner and managing director since 2001 is the Butcharts' great-granddaughter Robin-Lee Clarke.

In 1982 the Butchart Gardens was used as the inspiration for the gardens at the Canadian pavilion opened at Epcot Centre in Orlando Florida.

As of 2024, the Butchart Gardens employs 50 full-time gardeners to tend to the property and its 26 greenhouses. The Rose Garden contains 2,500 plants from 280 rose varieties.

== Collections ==
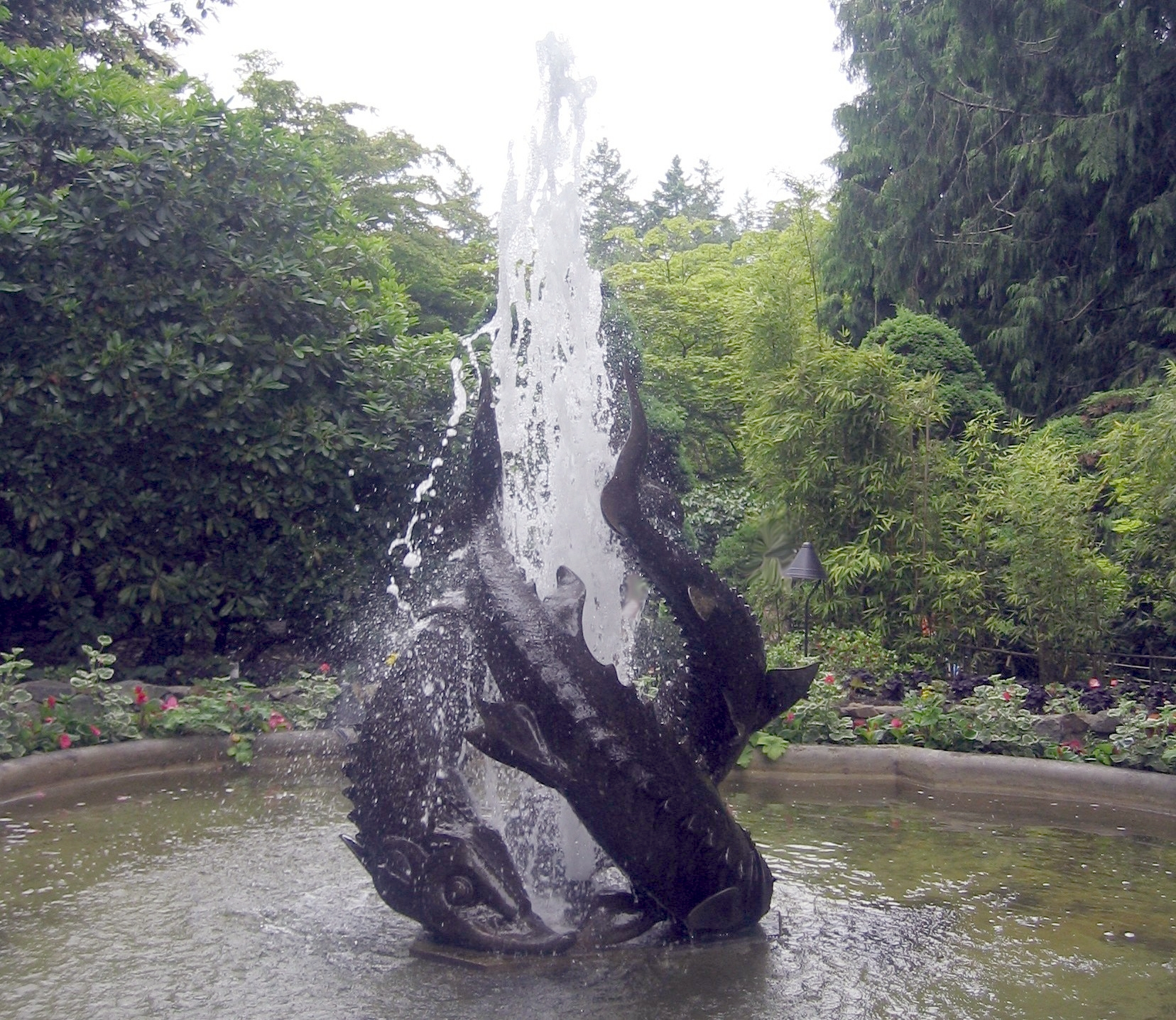
Sturgeon fountain

=== Birds ===
While Mrs. Butchart collected plants, Mr. Butchart collected ornamental birds from all over the world, having a parrot in the house, ducks in the Star Pond and peacocks on the front lawn. He built several elaborate birdhouses for the gardens and trained pigeons on the site of the present-day Begonia Bower.

=== Statues ===
Several bronze statues are displayed in the gardens.

One, of a wild boar, purchased on a Mediterranean trip in 1973, was cast in Florence by Ferdinando Marinelli Artistic Foundry, a replica of a 1620 bronze cast by Pietro Tacca. It is called "Tacca" in honor of the sculptor and, just as the original's, its snout is shiny from the many visitors rubbing it for luck.

Another, nearby in front of the residence, of a donkey and foal is by Sirio Tofanari. A fountain statue of three sturgeon, also by Tofanari (cast by Ferdinando Marinelli Artistic Foundry), is installed near the Japanese garden.

In 1993, "Circle of Doves", which Ann-Lee Ross gave her husband Ian in 1991 to commemorate their 50th wedding anniversary, was installed in front of the begonia bower.

In the summer of 2008, The Gardens introduced the Jennie B, an electrically driven 12-passenger boat, which plies the local coastlines in the summer giving visitors an appreciation of the waterside history plus coastal aquatic plants and animals.

On December 1, 2009, the Children's Pavilion and Rose Carousel were opened to the public. The Rose Carousel, crafted by Brass Ring Entertainment of Sun Valley, California is the only carousel on Vancouver Island. The menagerie includes thirty animals ranging from bears, to horses, to ostriches, to zebras, to cats and mirrors the world from which The Gardens draws its visitors. The designs were hand-picked by Robin Clarke, The Gardens' owner and great-granddaughter of Jennie Butchart, in consultation with an artist from North Carolina. The carvings were done by some of the few remaining carvers of carousel art. Each animal is carved from basswood and took many months to complete. There are also two chariots able to accommodate disabled persons.

The Rose Carousel is housed within the 700 m^{2} (7,500 sq ft) Children's Pavilion, which has a dome with a 23-metre (75 ft) clear span, a full-fronted glass façade and a roof planted with native plant species. The pavilion also has an event room for such things as children's birthday parties.

== Entertainment ==
In the early days, weekly symphony concerts were hosted by Mr. and Mrs. Butchart. These were often held for guests of the family, but later attracted a larger audience. More recently, in the Summer Season (July and August) they provide a wide range of local entertainment, from jazz to classical music. In 1977, Ian Ross's son Christopher (1944–2000) introduced firework shows accompanied by show tunes on summer Saturday evenings. During the Holiday Season, the twelve days of Christmas, lights and seasonal decorations adorn the gardens.

== Gallery ==
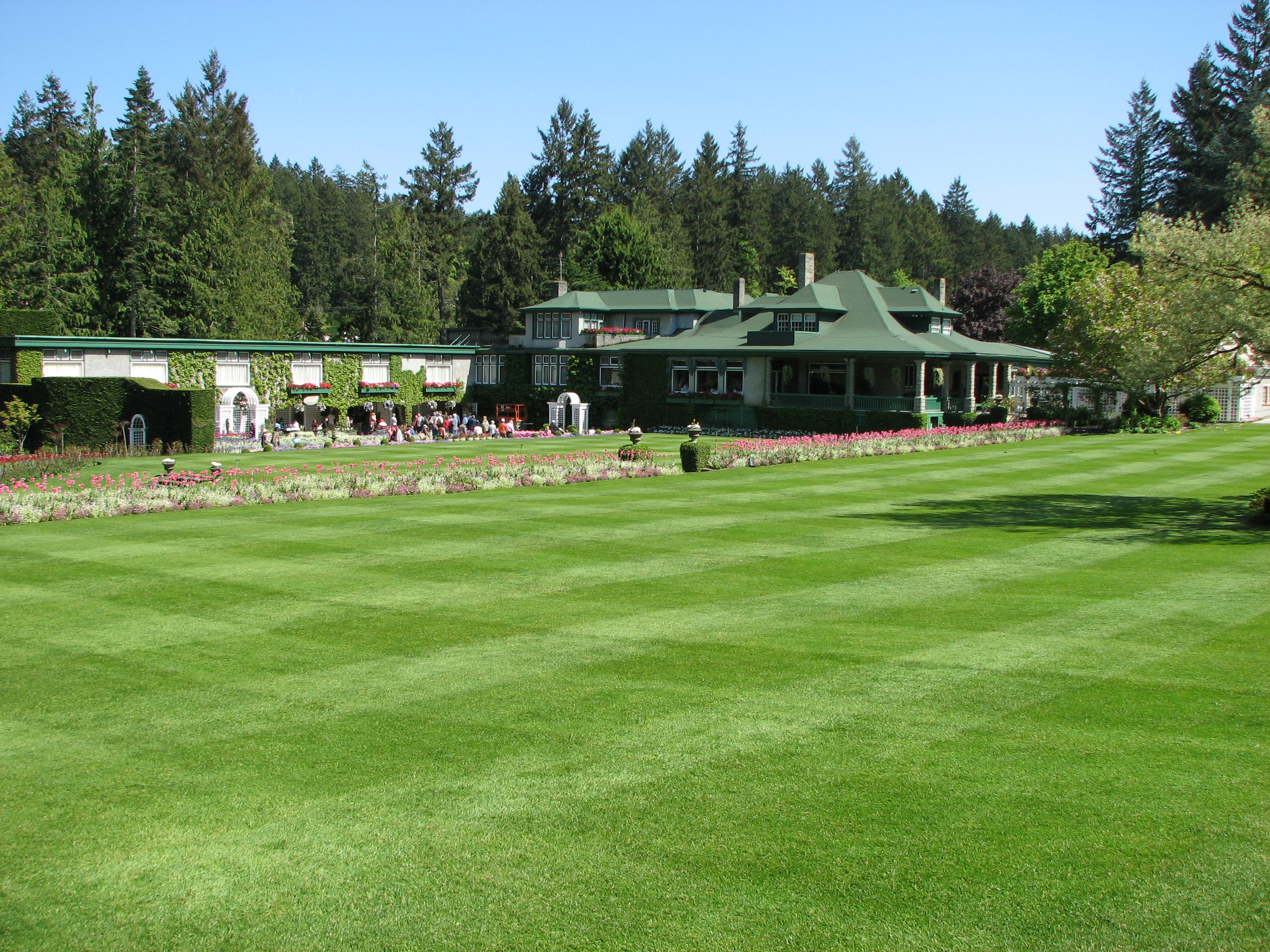
The former residence beyond the Italian Garden.

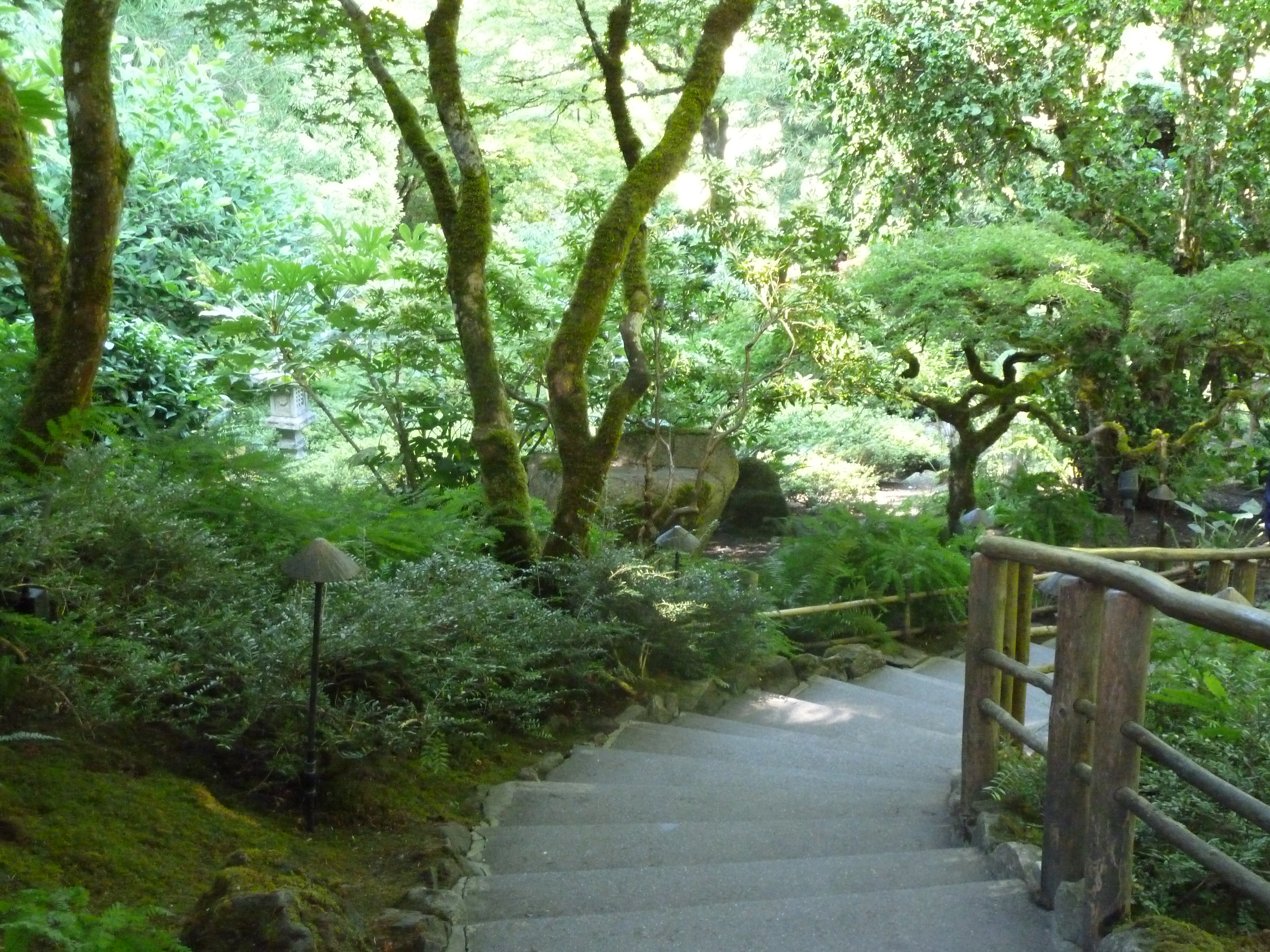
Japanese Garden

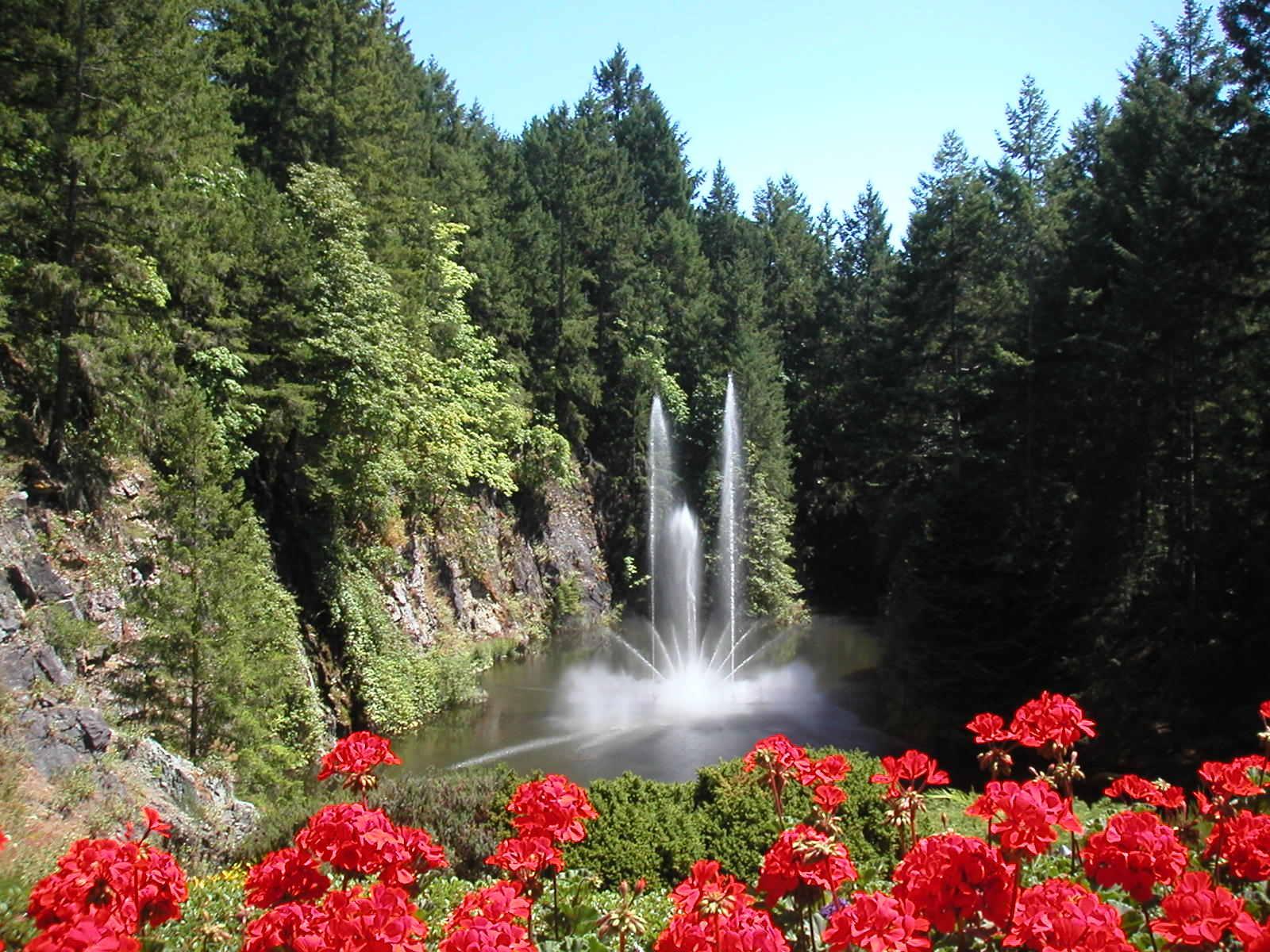
Ross Fountain

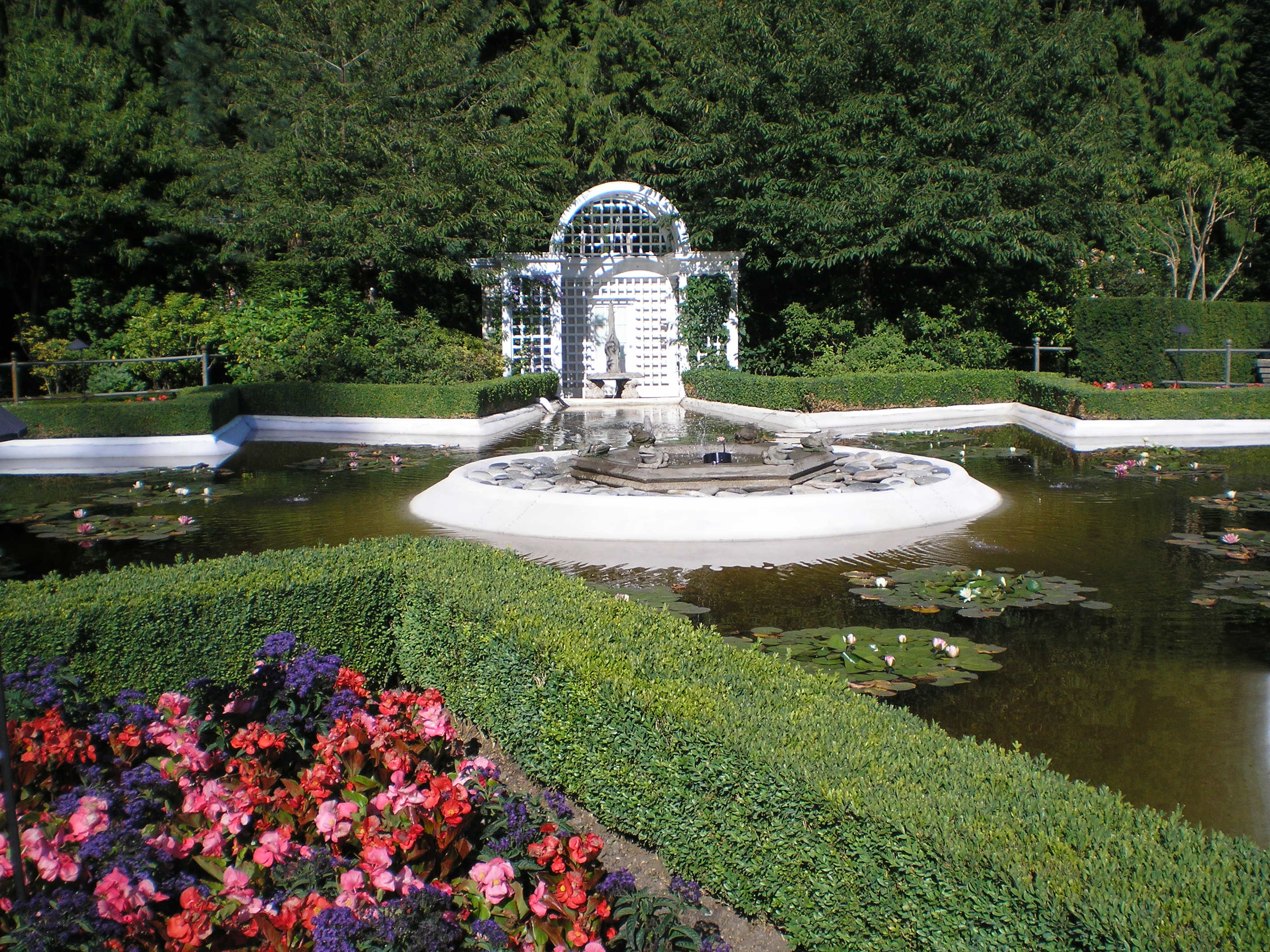
Star Pond

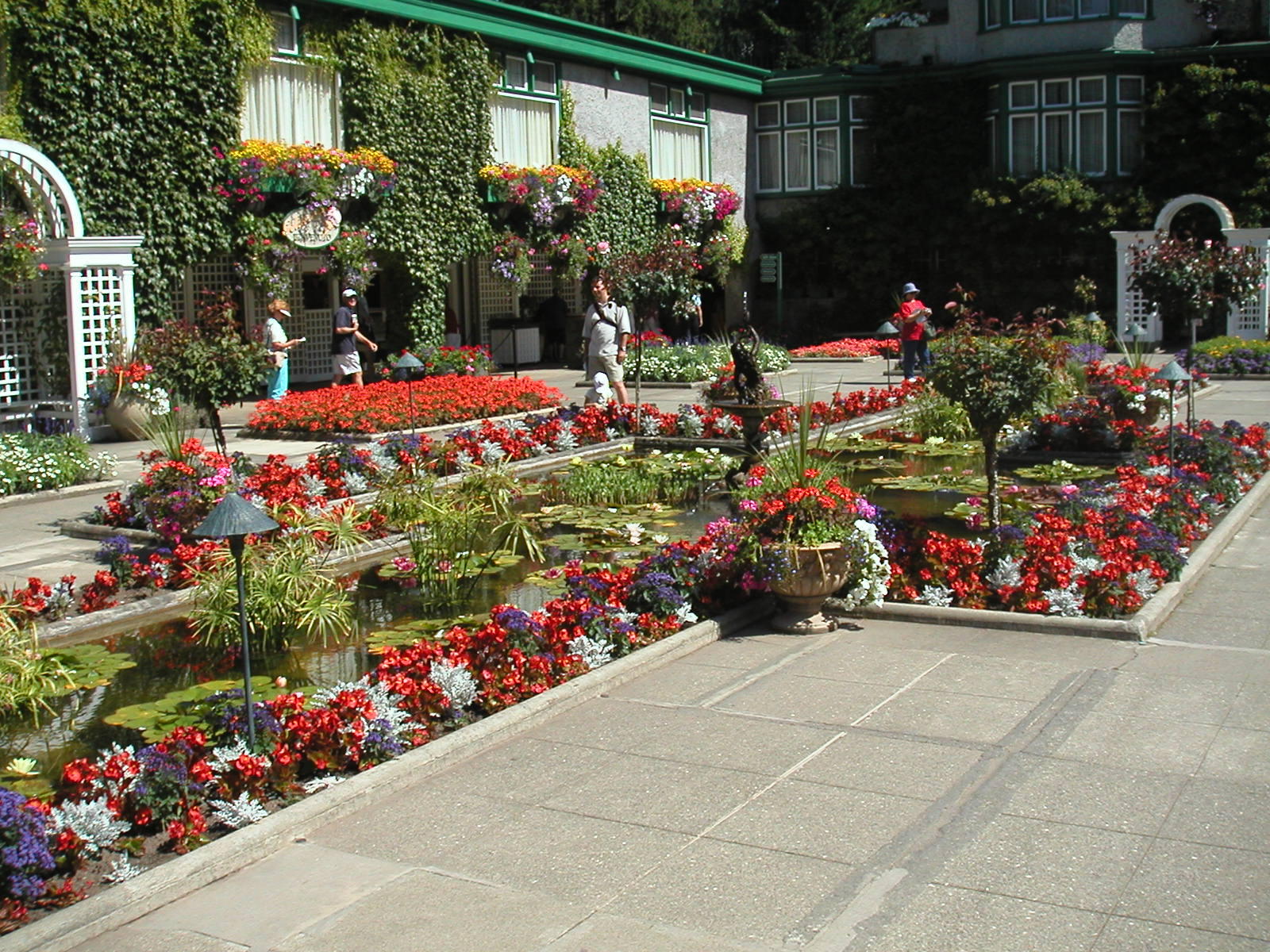
Italian Garden

A video covering the Gardens

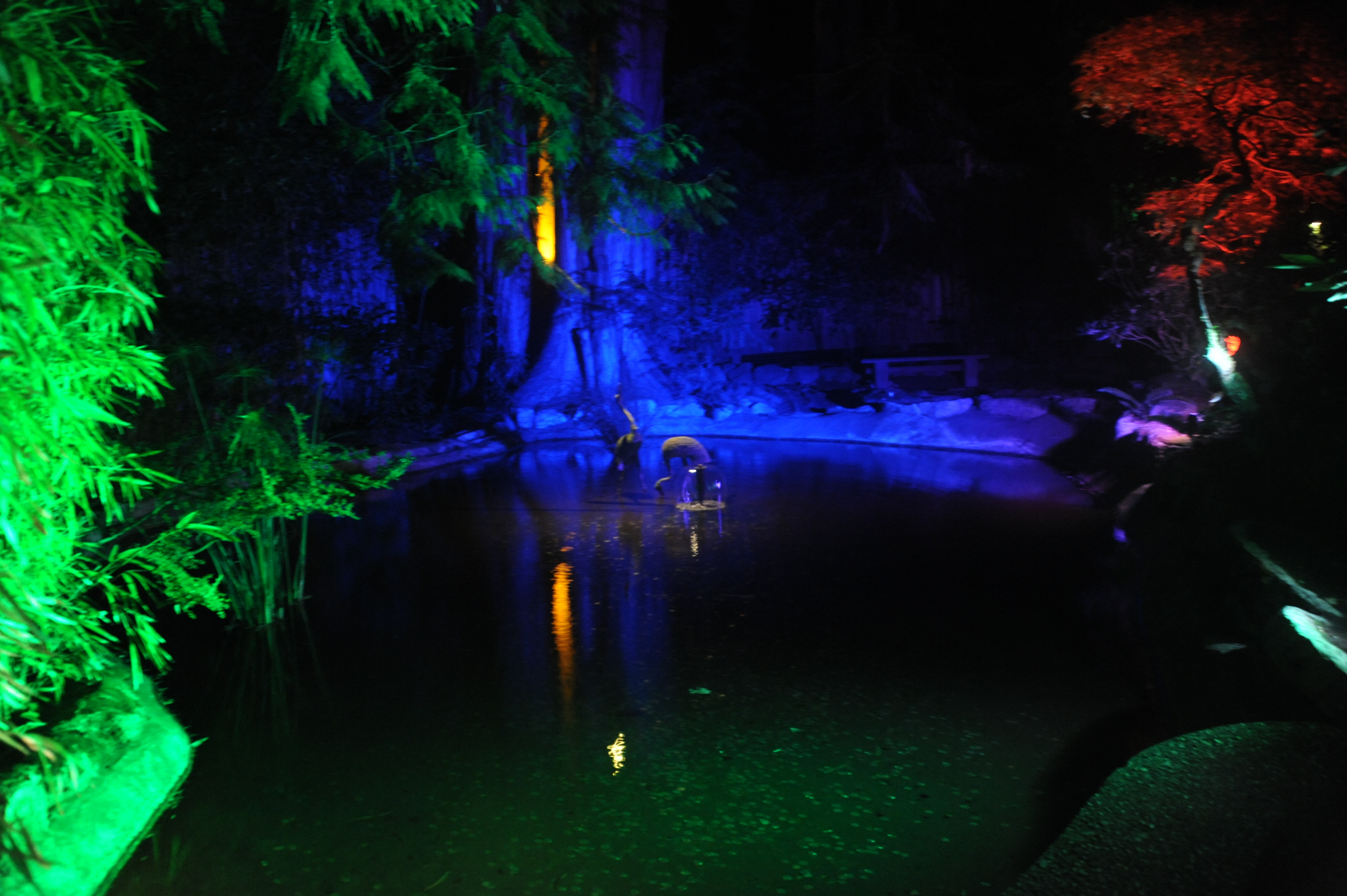
Japanese Garden at night
