= Point Diablo Light =

Lighthouse in California, United States

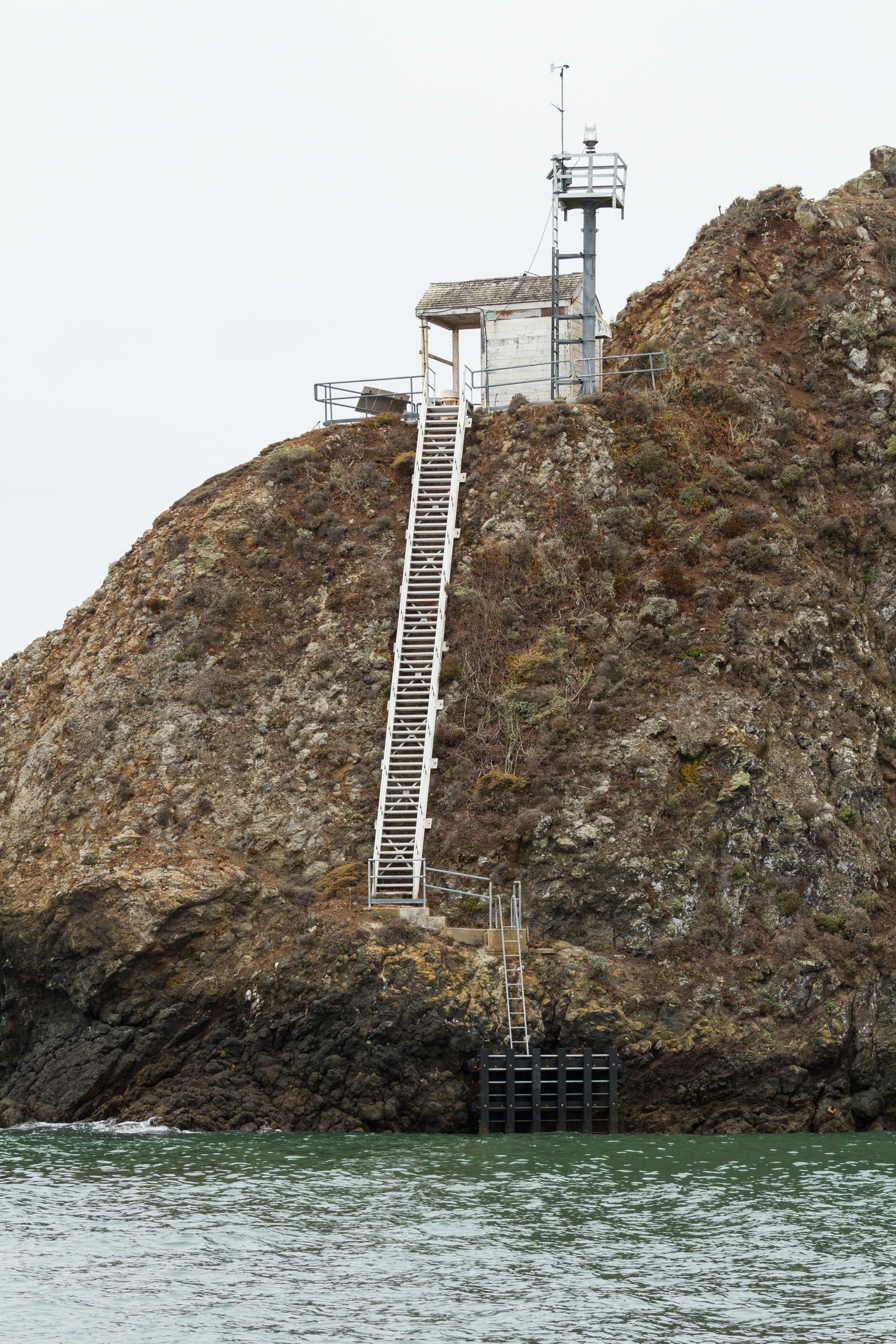
- The light seen from tour boat
- Location: Golden Gate; California; United States
- Coordinates: 37.820171°N 122.499423°W

Tower
- Constructed: 1923
- Construction: metal lamppost
- Height: 85 feet (26 m)
- Shape: cylindrical post with small platform and light
- Markings: unpainted
- Operator: Golden Gate National Recreation Area

Light
- Focal height: 26 m (85 ft)
- Lens: 2 lens lanterns (original), solar power (current)
- Characteristic: Iso W 6s.

The Point Diablo Light is a lighthouse in California, United States, about halfway between Point Bonita and Lime Point on the northern side of the Golden Gate Bridge, California

== History ==
In 1923, the Lighthouse Service decided to mark this navigational hazard, and a small white shack with a pitched red roof was placed on the sloping point some eighty feet above the water. An array of solar panels now powers the modern beacon positioned atop the shack.

== See also ==
- List of lighthouses in the United States
