= Golden Gate =

Strait in California, United States

- Chrysopylae; Boca del Puerto de San Francisco
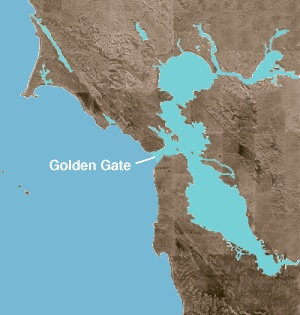
- A map showing the location of the Golden Gate strait

- Location within San Francisco Bay Area

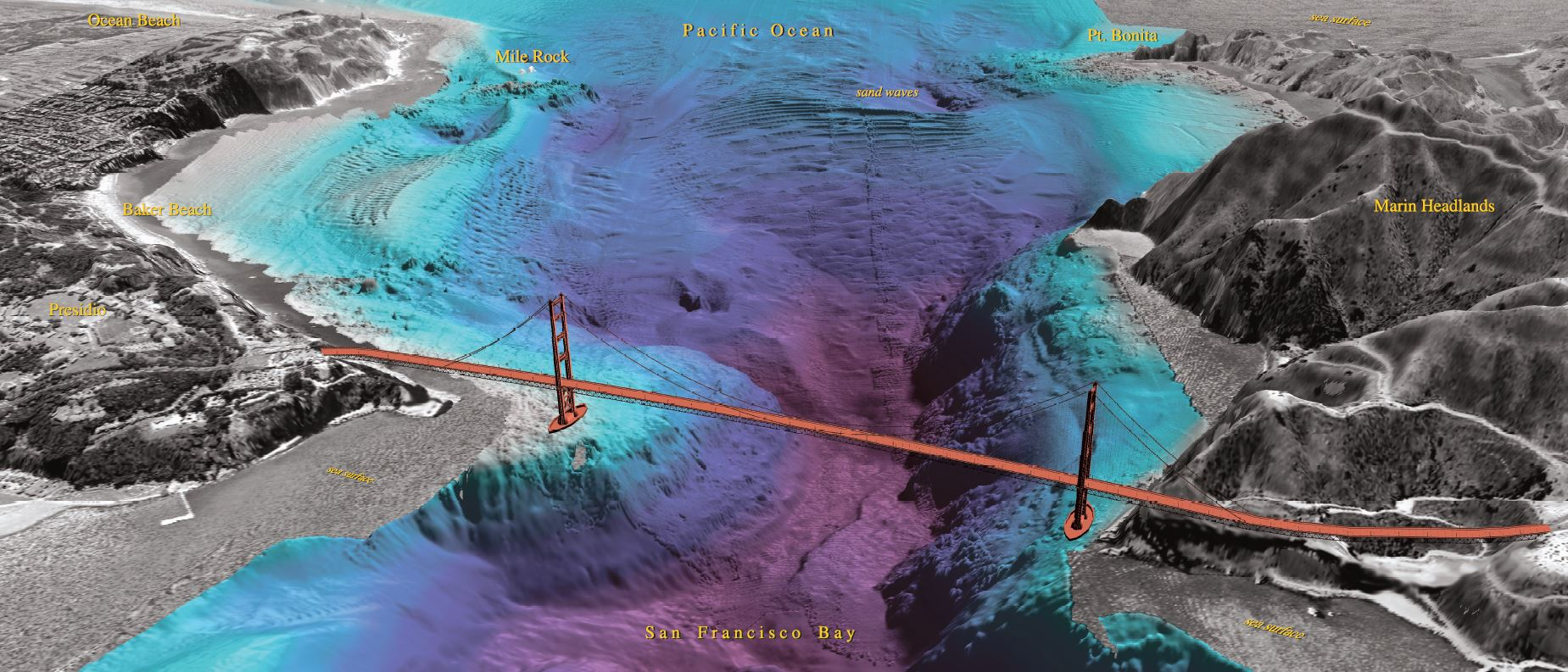
- Perspective view looking southwest over the Golden Gate Bridge toward the Pacific Ocean.
- Location: Between San Francisco Peninsula and Marin Headlands
- Coordinates: 37.81°N 122.50°W
- Type: strait
- Max. width: 3 miles (4.8 km)
- Min. width: 1.1 miles (1.8 km)
- Max. depth: 115 meters (377 ft)
- Settlements: San Francisco, CA

The Golden Gate is a strait on the west coast of North America that connects San Francisco Bay and the Pacific Ocean. It is defined by the headlands of the San Francisco Peninsula and the Marin Peninsula, and, since 1937, has been spanned by the Golden Gate Bridge. The entire shoreline and adjacent waters throughout the strait are managed by the Golden Gate National Recreation Area.

== Geology ==
During the last ice age, when sea level was several hundred feet lower, the waters of the glacier-fed Sacramento River and the San Joaquin River scoured a deep channel through the bedrock on their way to the ocean. (A similar process created the undersea Hudson Canyon off the coast of New York and New Jersey.) The strait is well known today for its depth and powerful tidal currents from the Pacific Ocean. Many small whirlpools and eddies can form in its waters. With its strong currents, rocky reefs and fog, the Golden Gate is the site of over 100 shipwrecks.

== Climate ==
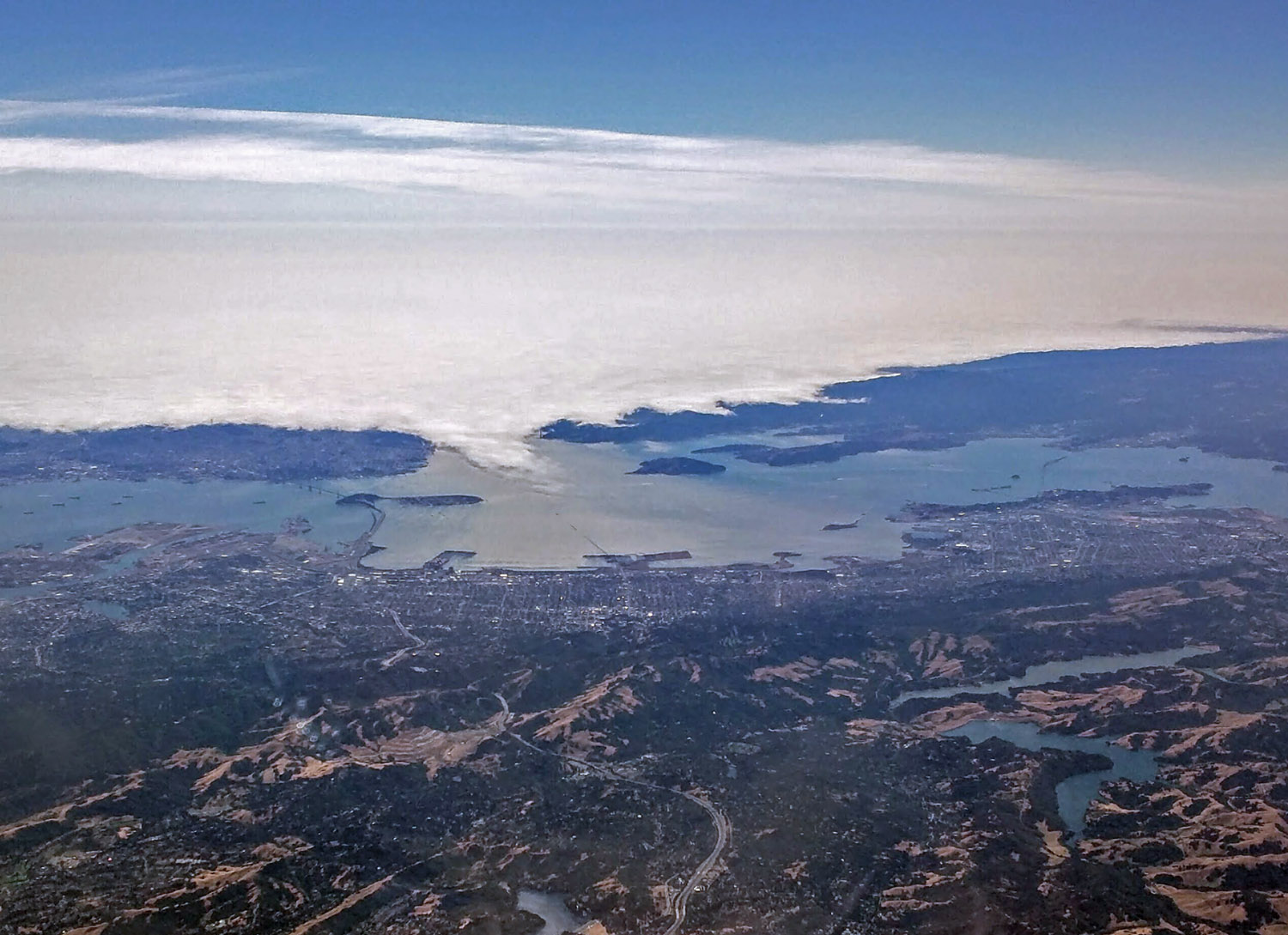
Fog rolls into San Francisco Bay through the Golden Gate, almost obscuring Alcatraz Island

The Golden Gate is often shrouded in coastal fog, especially during the summer. Heat generated in the California Central Valley causes air there to rise, creating a low pressure area that pulls in cool, moist air from over the Pacific Ocean. The Golden Gate forms the largest break in the hills of the California Coast Range, allowing a persistent, dense stream of fog to enter the bay there. Although there is no weather station on Golden Gate proper, the area has a mediterranean climate (Köppen Csb) with very narrow temperature fluctuations, cool summers and mild winters. For the nearest weather station, see the weatherbox of San Francisco. The Golden Gate Bridge being nearer the ocean and at elevation indicate it being cooler during summer days. Nearer the San Francisco urban core, the temperatures resemble the official NOAA weather station instead.

== History ==
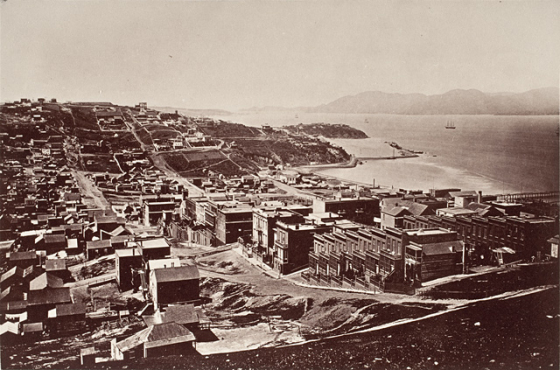
The Golden Gate photographed from Telegraph Hill by Carleton Watkins c. 1868

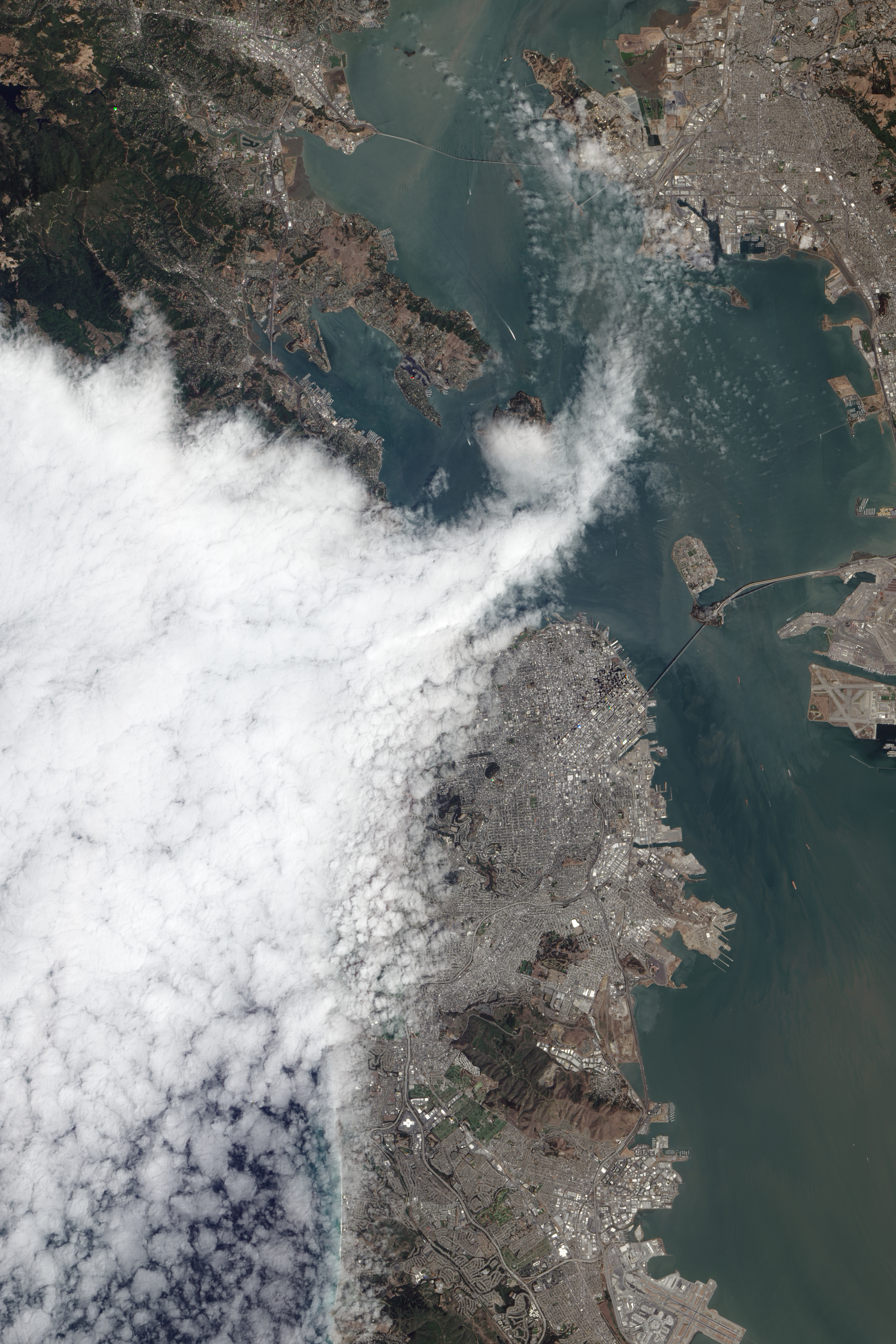
Fog obscures the Golden Gate as it spills into San Francisco Bay in this satellite image

Before Europeans arrived in the 18th century, the area around the strait and the bay was inhabited by Native Americans – the Ohlone people to the south and Coast Miwok to the north. Descendants of both tribes remain in the area.

The opening to the strait was surprisingly elusive for early European explorers, apparently because the persistent summer fog masked the strait's narrow entrance. The strait is not recorded in the voyages of Juan Rodríguez Cabrillo nor Francis Drake, both of whom may have explored the nearby coast in the 16th century in search of the fabled Northwest Passage. The strait is also unrecorded in observations by Spanish galleons on the Manila-Acapulco run from the Philippines that laid up in nearby Drakes Bay to the north. These rarely passed east of the Farallon Islands (27 miles (43 km) west of the Golden Gate), for fear of the possibility of rocks between the islands and the mainland.

The first recorded observation of the strait occurred nearly two hundred years later than the earliest European explorations of the coast. In 1769, Sgt José Francisco Ortega, the leader of a scouting party sent north along the San Francisco Peninsula by Don Gaspar de Portolá from their expedition encampment in San Pedro Valley to locate the Point Reyes headlands, reported back to Portolá that he could not reach the location because of the existence of the strait. On August 5, 1775 Juan de Ayala and the crew of his ship San Carlos became the first Europeans known to have passed through the strait, anchoring in a cove behind Angel Island, the cove now named in Ayala's honor. Until the 1840s, the strait was called the "Boca del Puerto de San Francisco" ("Mouth of the Port of San Francisco"). On July 1, 1846, before the discovery of gold in California, the entrance acquired a new name. In his memoirs, John C. Frémont wrote: "To this Gate I gave the name of 'Chrysopylae', or 'Golden Gate'; for the same reasons that the harbor of Byzantium was called Chrysoceras, or Golden Horn." He went on to comment that the strait was "a golden gate to trade with the Orient".

== Gallery ==
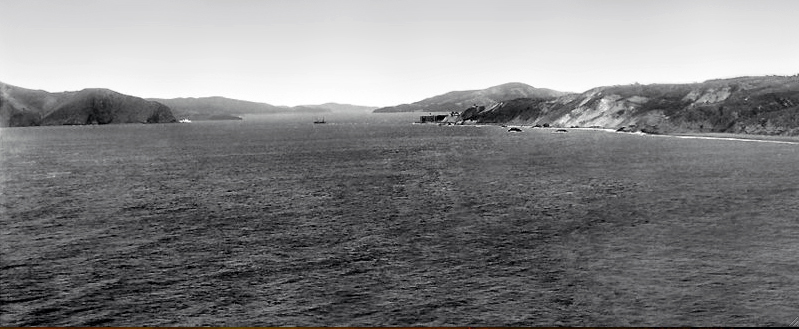
The Golden Gate as seen from off "Land's End" in Lincoln Park on the Northwest tip of the San Francisco Peninsula c. 1895

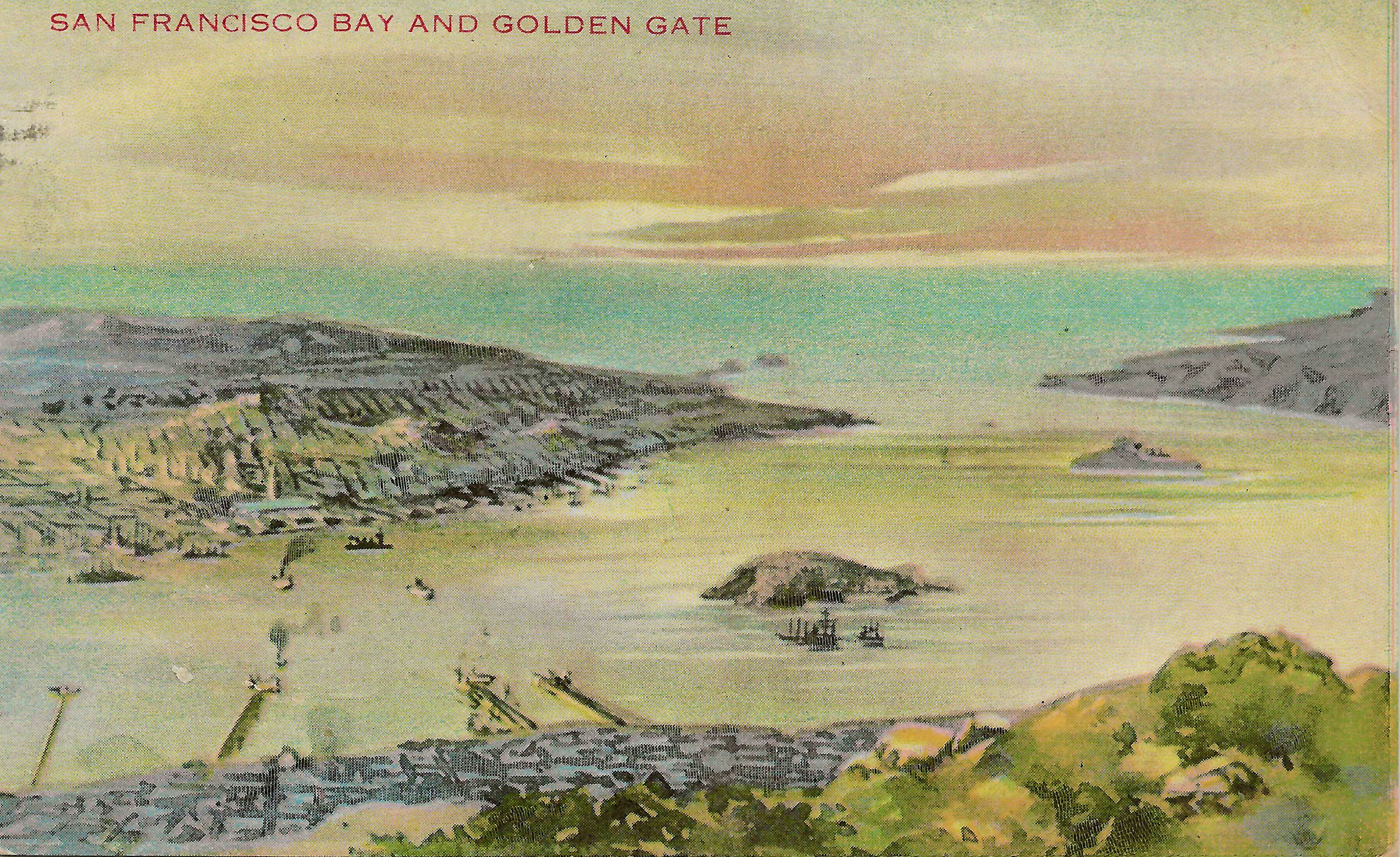
San Francisco Bay and Golden Gate

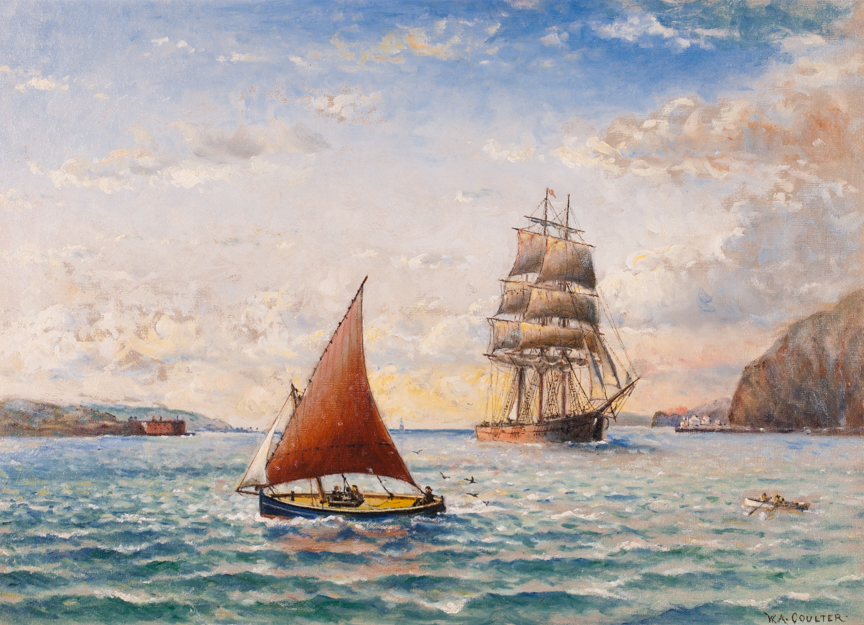
Passing Through the Golden Gate, by William A. Coulter

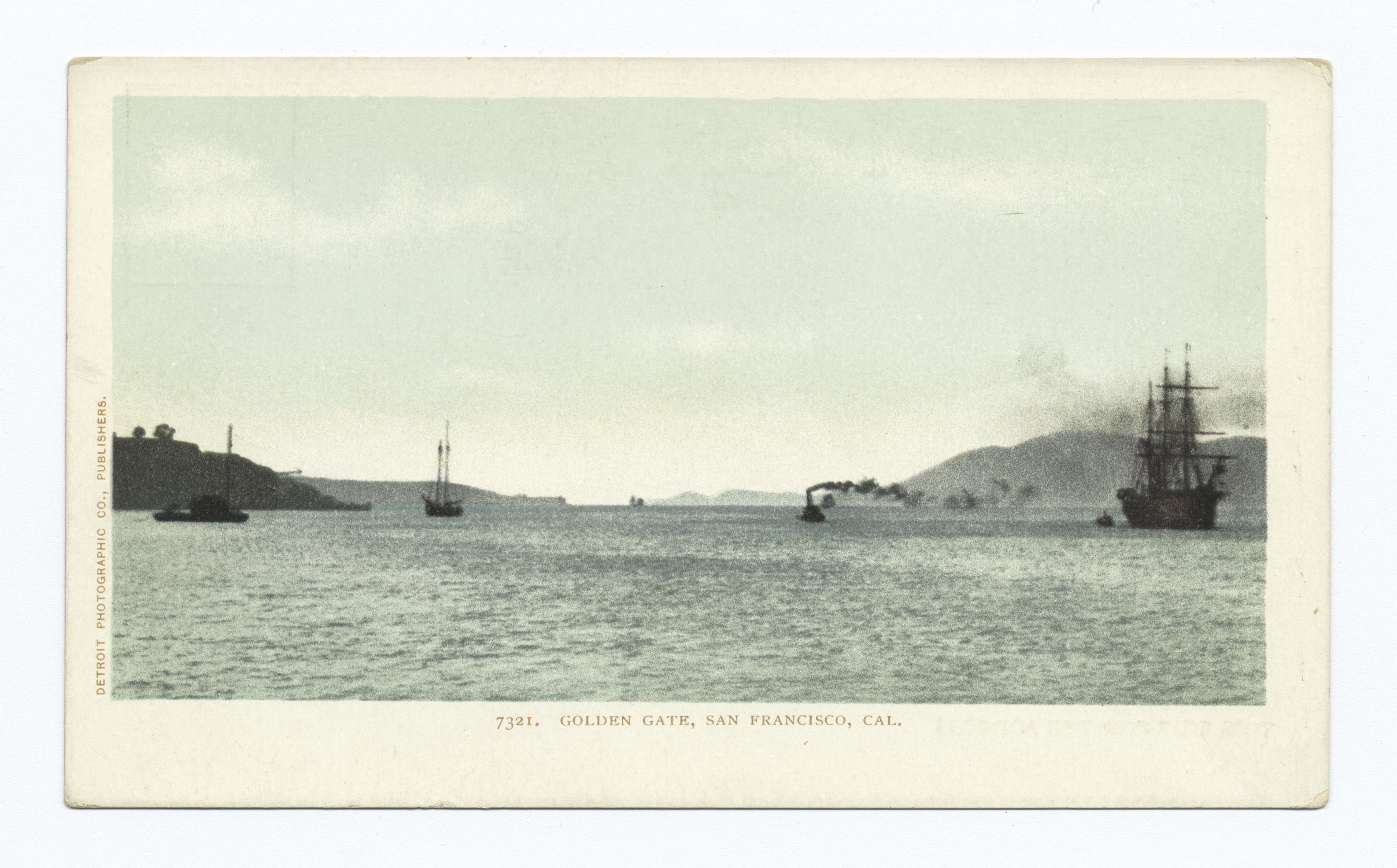
Postcard of the Golden Gate, c. 1898–1904

=== 1920s ===
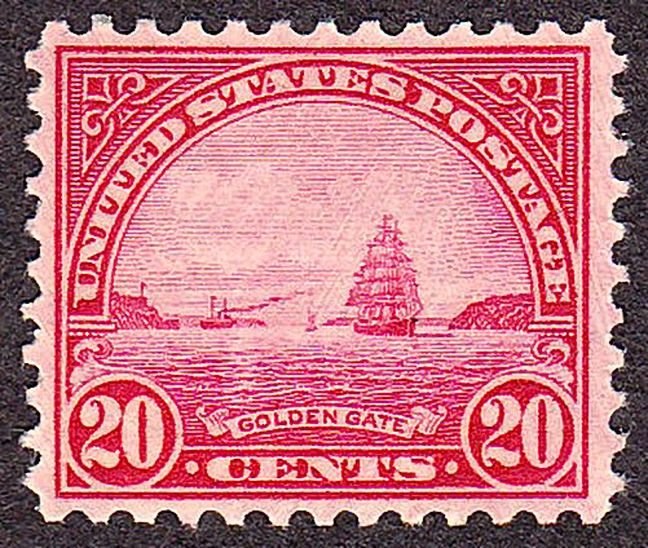
The Golden Gate, featured on a postage stamp issued in 1923

The U.S. Post Office issued a postage stamp on May 1, 1923, celebrating The Golden Gate, portraying the schooner USS Babcock passing through an empty strait. The Babcock served in the United States Navy from 1917 to 1919, with San Francisco as its port of call.

=== Golden Gate Bridge ===
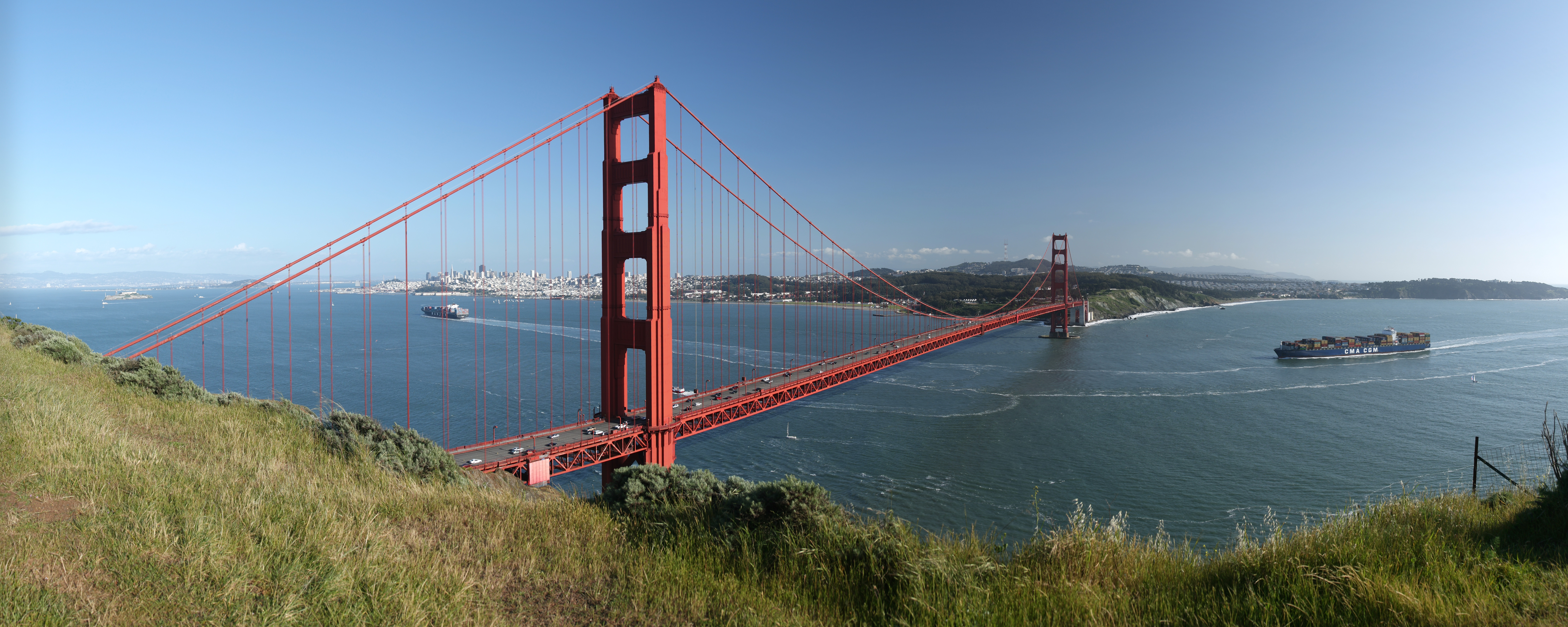
The Golden Gate Bridge, as seen from the Marin Headlands looking south

In 1933 construction began on the Golden Gate Bridge, a suspension bridge connecting the city of San Francisco on the northern tip of the San Francisco Peninsula to Marin County. Today it is part of both US Highway 101 and California Route 1.

The bridge was the longest suspension bridge span in the world when completed in 1937 and is an internationally recognized symbol of San Francisco and the state of California. Since its completion the span has been surpassed by eighteen other bridges and remains second longest in the United States, after the Verrazzano–Narrows Bridge in New York City. In 2007, it was ranked fifth on the List of America's Favorite Architecture by the American Institute of Architects.

== Navigation ==
The Golden Gate strait serves as the primary access channel for navigation to and from the San Francisco Bay, one of the largest cargo ports in the United States. Commercial ports include the Port of Oakland, the Port of Richmond, and the Port of San Francisco. Commercial cargo ships use the Golden Gate to access the San Francisco Bay, as well as barges, tankers, fishing boats, cruise ships, and privately owned boats, including wind-surfers and kite-boards. About 9000 ships moved through the Golden Gate in 2014, and a similar amount in 2015. The U.S Coast Guard maintains a Vessel Traffic Service to monitor and regulate vessel traffic through the Golden Gate.

For navigational guidance, there are white and green lights on the center of the span of the Golden Gate Bridge. Lighthouses with beacons and foghorns provide alerts at Point Bonita, Point Diablo, Lime Point and Mile Rocks. Before the Golden Gate Bridge was built, a lighthouse protected the south side of the strait at Fort Point. Buoys and radar reflectors provide additional navigational aid at various locations throughout the strait.

== See also ==
- Golden Gate, Oakland, California, a neighborhood
- Golden Gate Bridge, which extends across the Golden Gate strait
- Golden Gate National Recreation Area, a national park in the San Francisco Bay Area
- Golden Gate Park in San Francisco
