= Lime Point Light =

Lighthouse in California, United States

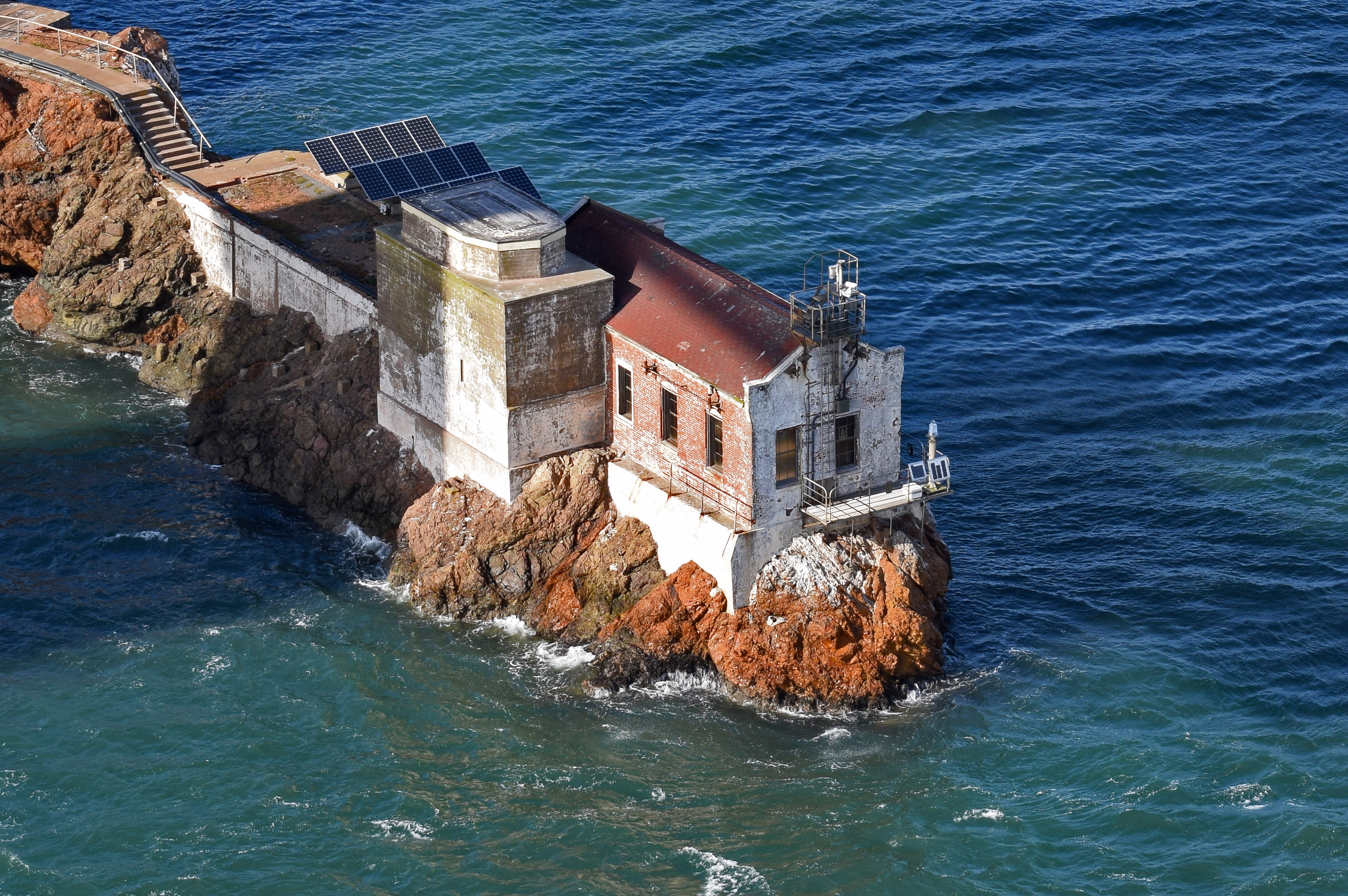
- Lime Point Light in 2019
- Location: Golden Gate Bridge; San Francisco; California; United States
- Coordinates: 37.825447°N 122.478321°W

Tower
- Constructed: 1883 (fog signal station); 1900 (first)
- Construction: brick building (first)
- Automated: 1961
- Height: 20 feet (6.1 m)
- Shape: square tower (first) post with beacon (current)
- Power source: solar power

Light
- First lit: 1961 (current)
- Deactivated: 1961 (first)
- Focal height: 15 feet (4.6 m) (current)
- Characteristic: Fl W 5s. (current); F W (first)

Lime Point Lighthouse is a lighthouse in California, on the northern side of the narrowest part of Golden Gate strait. The lighthouse sits at the base of a steep cliff, very near the north anchorage of the Golden Gate Bridge. It is built on a 100-foot (30 m) long rock spur at Lime Point.

== History ==
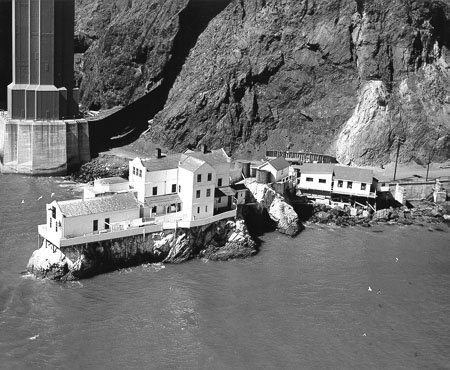
U.S. Coast Guard Archive

The brick structure for the Lime Point Lighthouse was built in 1883 as a fog-bell signaling station. It was eventually fitted with coal powered 12-inch (300 mm) steam whistles. During operation, the facility included the fog signal building, a coal shed, water tank and a two-story keeper's quarters. The keeper's building was later upgraded to include a third floor.

In 1900, a lens lantern was hung on the south-east corner of the fog signal building, at a height of 20 feet (6.1 m) above the water. In 1902, the coal-powered steam horn was modified to use crude oil to reduce operating costs and smoke pollution.

On June 3, 1960, the cargo ship India Bear rammed the lighthouse station in heavy fog. The ship's captain only realized at the last minute that the India Bear was about 180 meters off course. Despite an immediate reverse maneuver initiated, the bow of the ship ran aground on the ledge. The Lime Point Light Station sustained $7,500 in damage (most notably the facility's toilet was completely destroyed) in the accident, while damage to the freighter was $60,000. A subsequent investigation into the incident identified high winds, which rendered the foghorn signal ineffective, and currents in the strait as causes of the accident.

Lime Point Lighthouse continued to operate after the completion of the Golden Gate Bridge since it remained an effective position for a light and fog horn, even though Fort Point Light, at the South end of the bridge was decommissioned. Lime Point was automated by the United States Coast Guard in 1961, and the three-story dwelling and other buildings were torn down, leaving only the fog signal building, which remains.

== Gallery ==
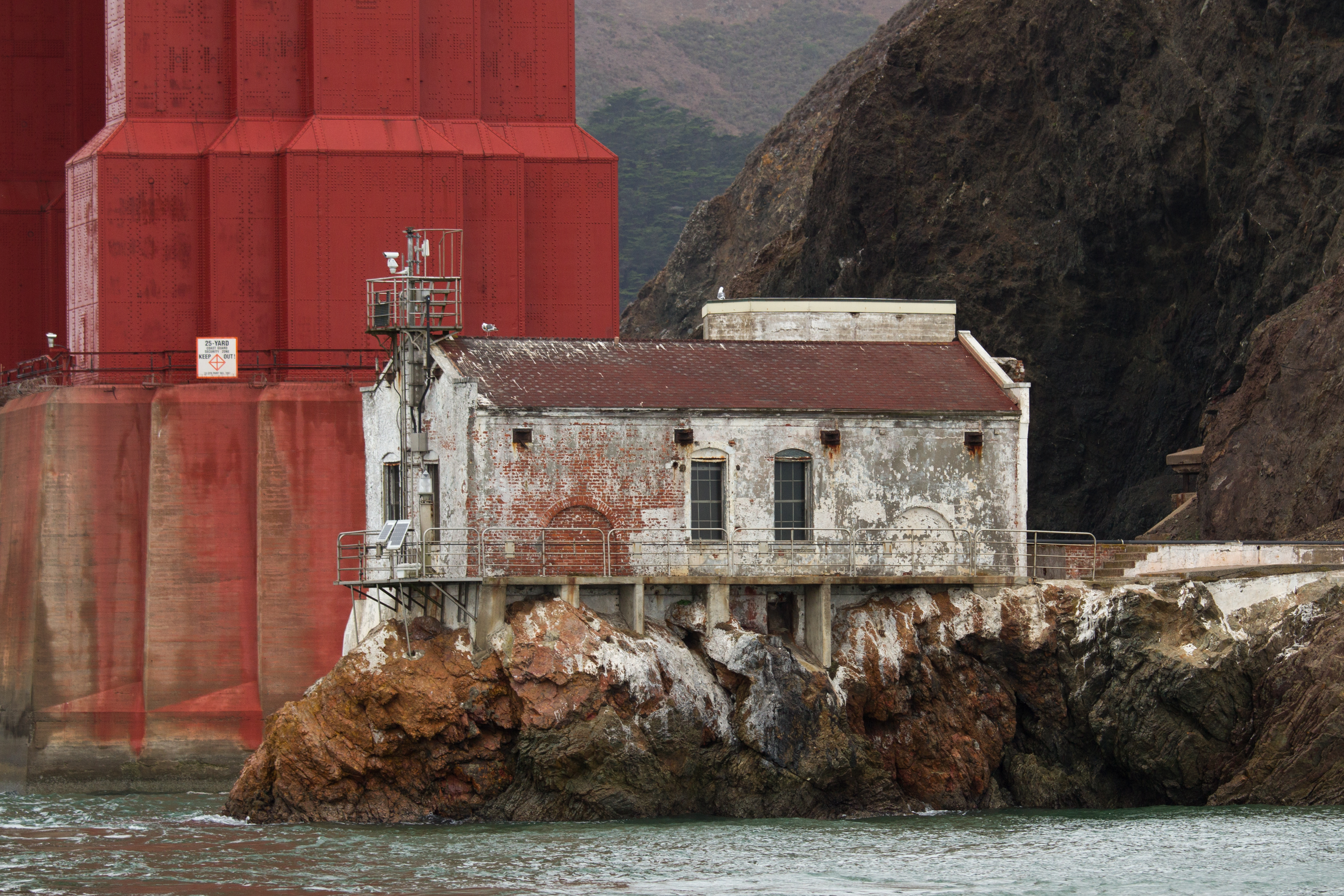
Side view of Lime Point Light

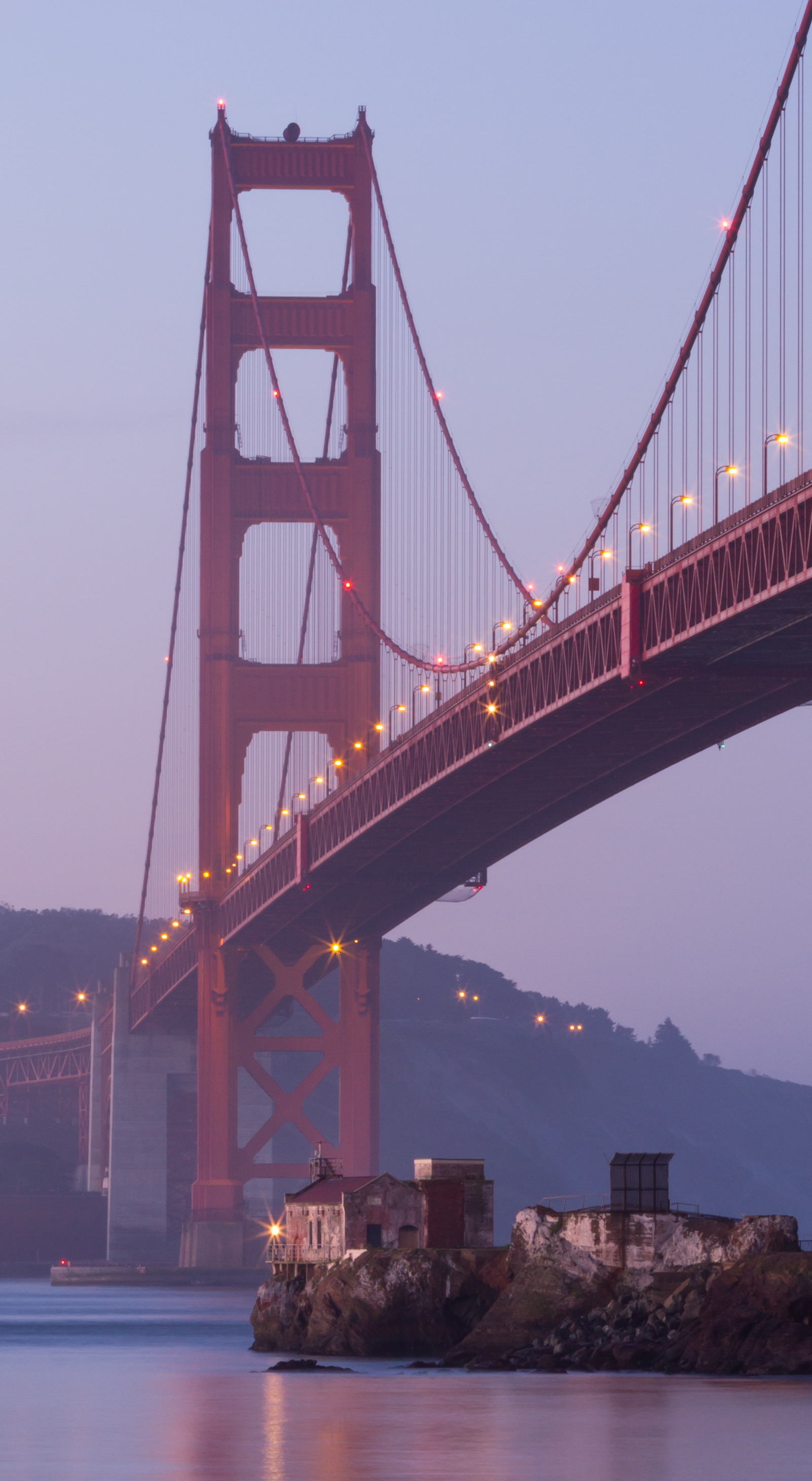
Lime Point Light with Golden Gate Bridge in the background

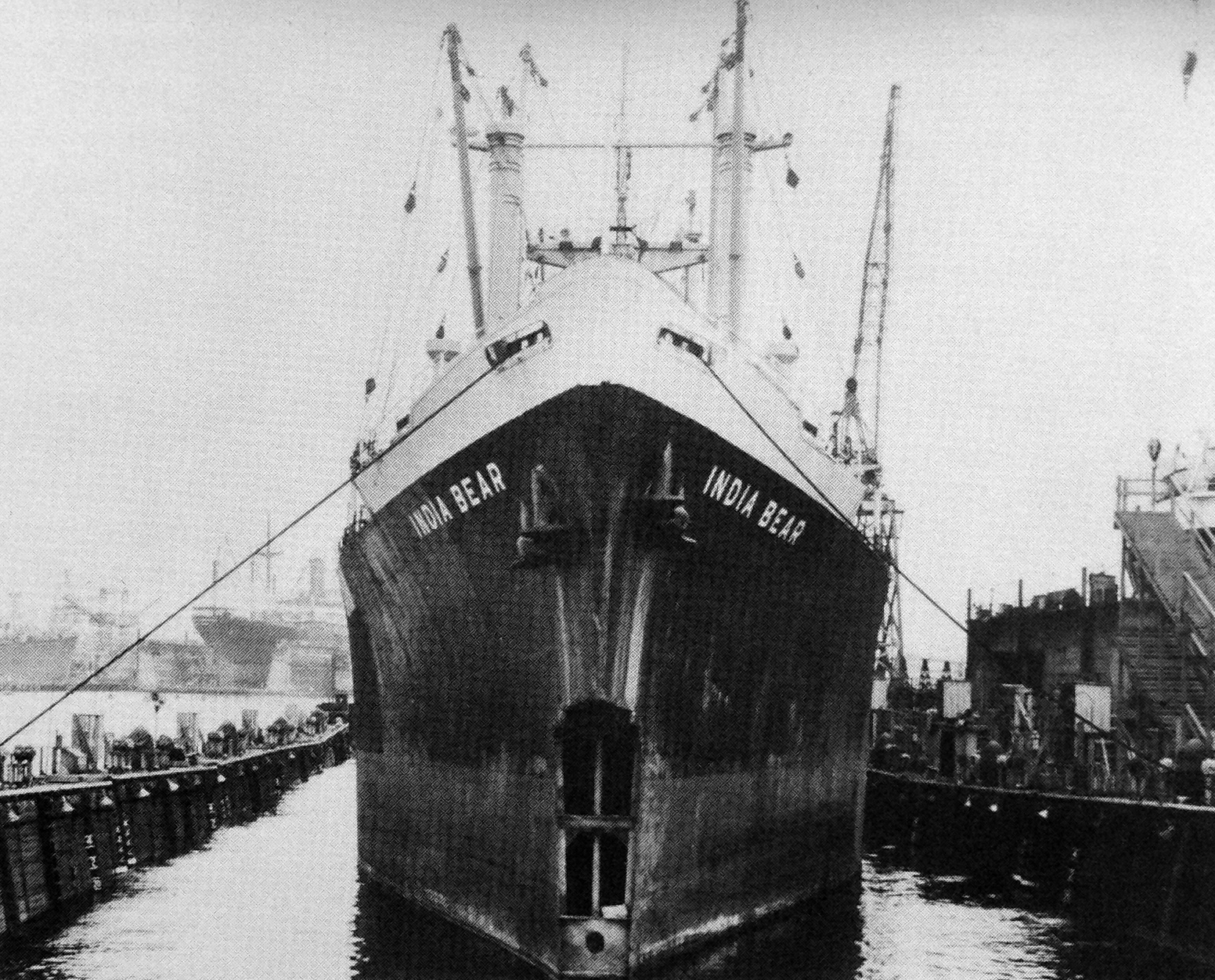
The freighter India Bear after ramming Lime Point Light in June 1960

== See also ==
- List of lighthouses in the United States
