= Grace Reformed Church (Washington, D.C.) =

Historic church in Washington, D.C., United States

- Grace Reformed Church, Sunday School and Parish House
- U.S. National Register of Historic Places
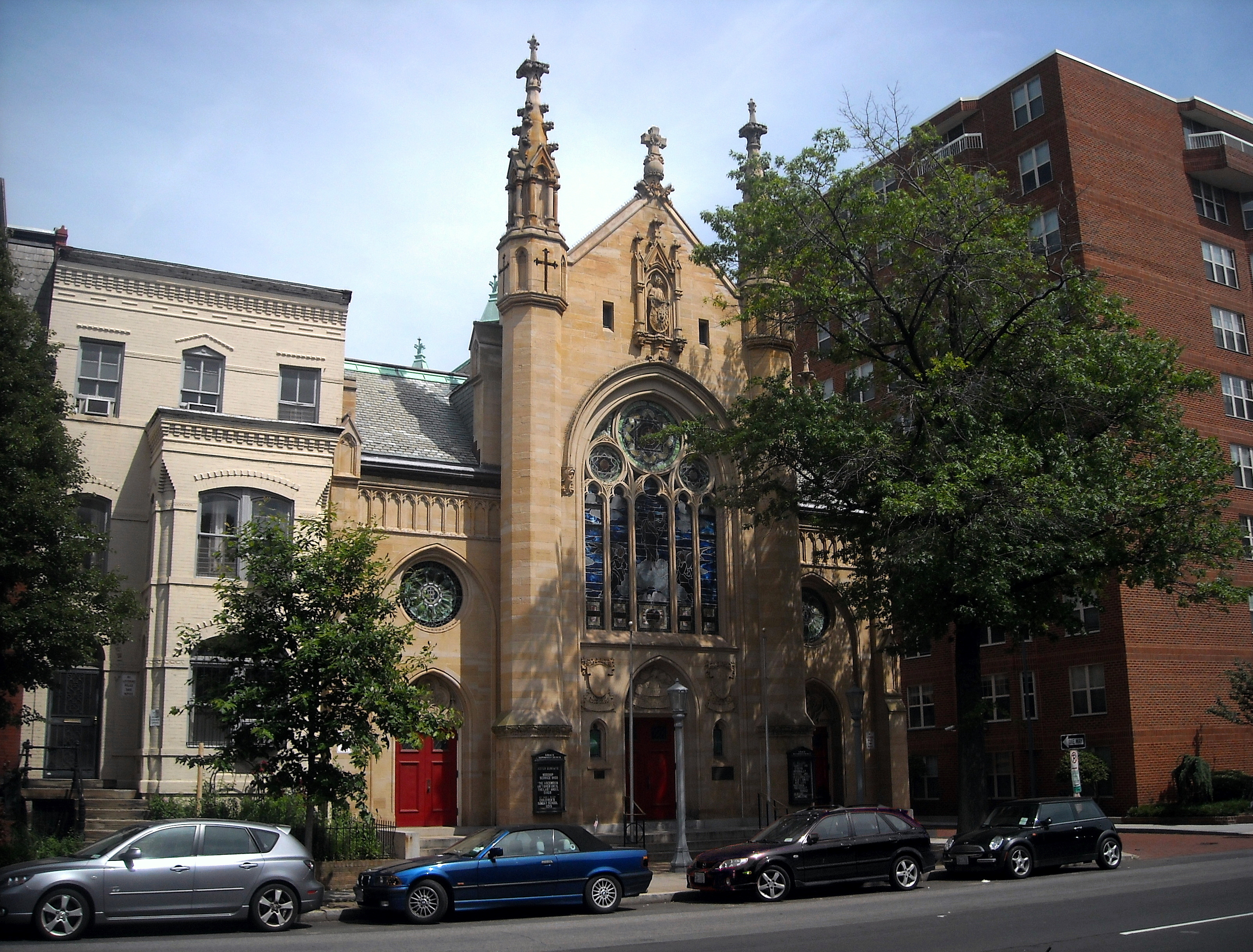

- Location within Washington, D.C.
- Location: 1405 15th St, NW, Washington, D.C.
- Coordinates: 38°54′32″N 77°2′3″W
- Area: 0.2 acres (0.081 ha)
- Built: 1892–1903
- Architect: Paul J. Pelz
- Architectural style: Late Gothic Revival
- NRHP reference No.: 91000396
- Added to NRHP: April 18, 1991

Grace Reformed Church is a historic church building in Northwest, Washington, D.C. A notable member was Theodore Roosevelt, who regularly attended services there during his term as United States president.

The congregation was originally organized in 1877 as a member of the Reformed Church in the United States (RCUS), which eventually merged into the United Church of Christ (UCC). Construction on the current building began in 1902, with then-Vice President Roosevelt laying the cornerstone; he also gave an address at its 1903 dedication.

As of late 2019, the original congregation no longer met at the building, but two other congregations occupied it as renters. Christ Reformed Church (URCNA) rented space in the building from approximately 2011 to the end of 2019. In 2016, Christ Reformed was told that its rental agreement would soon be ending to facilitate a likely sale of the building. Christ Reformed announced its new location in December 2019.

The Community Church of Washington, D.C. (CCWDC) also holds services in the building. Like the original Grace Reformed, it is a congregation of the United Church of Christ. As of December 2019, CCWDC had not yet formal plans to vacate the property.

The church was added to the National Register of Historic Places, along with its Sunday School and Parish House, in 1991.

== History ==
Grace Reformed Church, located in Washington D.C., was organized with 14 charter members on October 7, 1877. The church traces its roots to the Protestant Reformation in Switzerland in the 16th century. The congregation was established for English-speaking Reformed Church in the United States (RCUS) believers. Grace Reformed Church was initially supported as a mission church by the Maryland Classis, the governing body of the Reformed Church in the region.

Most RCUS congregations merged with the Evangelical Synod of North America (ESNA) to form the Evangelical and Reformed Church (E&R) of the United States in 1934. That denomination, in turn, merged in 1957 with the majority of the Congregational Christian Churches (CC) to form the present-day United Church of Christ (UCC).

=== Theodore Roosevelt and Grace Reformed Church ===
Theodore Roosevelt was a member of Grace Reformed church while President of the United States.

Roosevelt originally belonged to the Reformed Church in America (RCA), a Dutch-American group. As a private person, Roosevelt attended religious services wherever he was. He preferred the Reformed Church if one were available to attend and is reported to have said, "I take a sentimental satisfaction in worshiping in the Church of my fathers."

Since there were no RCA congregations in Washington, he chose Grace Reformed Church as a church similar liturgically and theologically to Dutch Calvinism.

Roosevelt began attending Grace Reformed Church soon after his arrival in Washington, D.C., in 1901 as vice-president of the United States. Reverend Dr. J.M. Schick, Pastor of Grace Reformed Church between 1900 and 1913, invited Roosevelt to make the church his home. Roosevelt did so and attended church regularly during his eight years in Washington.

The President often walked from the White House to attend Sunday morning worship services at Grace Church. The President was usually accompanied by two Secret Service men, and often with family members or friends. He regularly had flowers sent to adorn the altar from the greenhouse at the White House and was a faithful communicant between 1901 and 1909. Roosevelt is reported to have taken part in all the service, singing every hymn, and listening to the sermon, even jotting down notes on the sermons. His regular pew is still in the church. Roosevelt's appreciation for the spiritual support that he received from his church attendance was communicated by letters he sent to the pastor as well as the gifts of two bishop chairs and his portrait to the church.

President Roosevelt laid the cornerstone of Grace Reformed Church on July 1, 1902, and spoke at its dedication on June 7, 1903. As his speech at the dedication ceremony of Grace Reformed Church concluded:

"This church is consecrated here to-day to duty and service, to the worship of the Creator, and to an earnest effort on our part so to shape our lives among ourselves and in relation to the outside world that we may feel that we have done our part in ringing a little nearer the day when there shall be on this earth a genuine brotherhood of man."

President Dwight D. Eisenhower attended a special Sunday morning worship service at Grace Reformed Church in October 1958 that commemorated the 100th birthday anniversary of Theodore Roosevelt.

== Structure ==
The "Grace Reformed Church, Sunday School and Parish House" was constructed between 1892 and 1903. Grace Reformed Church was added to the National Register of Historic Places in 1991.

Located on 15th Street, N.W. in Washington, D.C., Grace Reformed Church comprises three buildings: the Church or Sanctuary; the Sunday School; and the Parish House. The Church, designed by Paul J. Pelz and A. A. Ritcher, was constructed between 1902 and 1903. The Sunday School, also designed by Pelz, was constructed from 1911 to 1912. The Parish House, preceding both religious structures, was erected in 1892 by W. H. H. Knight, a member of the congregation. The three structures are situated so that the Parish House and Church front 15th Street, N.W. while the Sunday School, abutting the Church to the east, faces onto an alley which was originally intended as O Street, N.W.

The architectural style is Late Gothic Revival.

The exterior design, with its stone shields of Zurich and Geneva and stone heads of the knight and burgher, symbolizes the history of the Reformed Church. The interior contains seven colorful stained-glass windows depicting the life of Christ from the Visit of the Magi to the Ascension.

=== History ===
In 1880, the Maryland Classis purchased the current site of Grace Reformed Church at 1405 15th Street and in 1881, a chapel was constructed. Designed in the Queen Anne style, the chapel was built at a cost of $4,100 at the rear of the lot on 15th Street, reserving the front portion of the lot for a church. In 1892, the Parish House was built. The name listed on the permit to build as architect was W.H.H. Knight, known to have been a member of the congregation.

In 1899, it was felt that the Reformed Church denomination needed a new church located in Washington, D.C., to be a national symbol of the denomination and to strengthen its outreach in the nation's capital. The Board of Home Missions in the Maryland Classis challenged the entire Reformed Church in the United States to raise money to build "a suitable church on that fine lot." Money and support began to be collected from members of Reformed congregations throughout the United States. The decision of President Theodore Roosevelt to worship at the church added to the significance of the building's role in representing the denomination in the nation's capital. These sentiments were summed up by the Reformed Church Messenger, the denomination's newspaper, on the occasion of the dedication of the church in 1903:

In erecting this building the Reformed Church has done an appropriate thing in a beautiful way. The denomination would have aided the Washington Church, in any event, in erecting a house of worship. But the coming of President Roosevelt to worship with our Reformed people gave new life as well as new significance to the movement to erect a new church in Washington. ... In the first place, the church building is one of which the Reformed Church may be proud. No picture yet printed has given an adequate idea of the beauty of the structure. Within and without it is as beautiful and artistic as it is substantial and complete. The finished structure reflects credit on all who have had anything to do with its erection. Any member of the church visiting Washington will find a church of which he may be proud. Neither in Washington nor elsewhere will be found a building which so appropriately and so adequately meets the purpose of its erection. It stands as a monument first of all to the power and grace of the kingdom of Jesus Church but it represents at the same time the history and genius of the Reformed Church. (June 11, 1903)

The article further emphasized the significance of the choice of the Gothic Revival style to represent the Reformed movement:

The style of architecture; the shields of Geneva, Zurich and the Palatinate; the emblems cut into stone arches over the entrances to the church and the memorials in the windows and the chancel, combine to make one harmonious story easily understood by anyone who knows the Reformed Church. (June 11, 1903)

=== Construction ===
Designs for Grace Reformed Church in Washington, D.C., were begun in 1901, after an agreement was reached and signed between architects Paul J. Pelz and A. A. Ritcher and the Building Committee of Maryland Classis.

Specifications detailing the contractor's responsibilities and the building materials to be used were drawn up and signed by Pelz in April 1902, while a contract between the church and the builders, Richardson and Burgess of Washington, D.C., was signed in May 1902. The D.C. Building Permit (D.C. Permit #2052, 06/07/1902) was filed in June 1902. President Theodore Roosevelt laid the cornerstone on July 1 of the same year.

According to the building specifications, the church was of fireproof construction. Several types of materials were used on the building, including stone, brick, iron, copper, tin and slate. The stone facing was specified as Amherst Grey Canyon, supplied by the Cleveland Stone Company. All roofs were covered with Matthews Vermont slate and all cornice gutters were lined with McClure's IX Genuine Charcoal Iron redipped Tin. The hardware was specified from the Catalogue of the Reading Hardware Company, and the doors and their frames were to be red birch, inside and out.

In early 1903, the exterior walls were erected and the sculptural ornamentation was being completed. By early April, the interior of the church was being finalized. At this time, the wainscoting was almost complete, one-third of the floor was laid, a three-manual organ had been purchased, and final preparations were beginning for the dedication ceremony scheduled or June 1903.

The architect and contractors had not fully completed their contract by the dedication ceremony, however. On July 25, 1903, a piece of copper work in the alley side cornice had come loose. On July 28 the copper cornice was repaired and the building finally completed.

==== The Architect: Paul J. Pelz ====
Paul J. Pelz, architect of Grace Reformed Church in association with A. A. Ritcher, and architect alone for the Sunday School Building, is best known in Washington, D. C. for his design of the Library of Congress. Pelz was also responsible for Georgetown University's Healy Hall, Riggs Memorial Library, and Medical Department; the Carnegie Library and Music Hall at Allegheny (now part of Pittsburgh), Pennsylvania; the Chamberlain Hotel at Fort Monroe, Virginia; the Government Hospital Buildings at Hot Springs, Arkansas; and the Hospital and Administration Buildings at the University of Virginia; and a great many private residences.

Judging from the correspondence between Pelz and the Building Committee during the construction of Grace Reformed Church, Pelz became inspired by the Reformed Church and its philosophies. He studied the history of the church and made an effort to incorporate sculptural elements on the church which were symbolic of the Reformation movement and the Reformed Church. He took pride in the symbolic aspect of the church which had been artistically carved by sculptor James F. Earley and considered Grace Reformed Church, upon completion, "more artistic than any church in this city."

In May 1903 a letter from Pelz to Reverend Slagle indicates that, as the church was nearing completion, Pelz was happy with the results. Pelz wrote, "I am truly proud of my work having striven hard to make ends meet. I was [,] through your confidence and liberality with what you could command...enabled to make the very best use of your money and have given you a thoroughly well digested, well built edifice. To the builders belongs great credit for having entered into the spirit which moved me with enthusiasm, and I am prone to say that I have sent my own inspiration down to the very hearts of all the workmen from the foreman down the chain to the very hod carriers and laborers, who are to day proud of having worked on your church..."

In his last official letter to Reverend Slagle, dated August 11, 1903, Pelz recognized the church's artistic value. He wrote, "The church itself is a creation to which I look with much pride. Your liberality permitted me to make it more artistic than any church in this city, and I think of few churches in the United States which have a more artistic development. The quality of the sculptural work you permitted me to apply is of a high grade and should lead to emulation by other denominations for their memorial churches, if their building committees are intelligent enough to rise to the understanding required."

Pelz's relationship with Grace Reformed Church did not end with the completion of the church. Eight years later, he was retained as the architect of the Sunday School Building which replaced the original Queen Anne chapel. Pelz's design for the Sunday School was executed again in the Gothic Revival style. This choice of style unified the new Sunday School Building with the design of the original church.

==== A. A. Ritcher ====
A. A. Ritcher of Lebanon, Pennsylvania, was also responsible for the design of Grace Reformed Church. It is not known why the two architects collaborated on the design of the building. Although not as active in overseeing construction at the church as Pelz, Ritcher did receive half of the architects' fees, indicating that his role was more than minimal.

Very little is known about Ritcher. He was born in Philadelphia in 1873 and died in 1925. He was a member of the firm Ritcher and Eiler, specialists in school design. He was a member of the Historical Society in Lebanon, Pennsylvania in 1911 and is listed as the architect with Beard Construction Company.

==== The Sculptor: James F. Earlev ====
James F. Earley was responsible for the sculptural work on Grace Reformed Church. A fourth or fifth generation stone carver, James F. Earley, was born in Birmingham, England in 1856 and studied sculpture at the Royal Academy in London.

Between 1892 and his death in 1906, James F. Earley was responsible for much sculpture found on private residences, commercial and religious structures in Washington, D.C. Some of his particular pieces include the marble pulpit at St. Patrick's Roman Catholic Church, the altar and statues at the Franciscan Monastery in Brookland (which won him a medal by Pope Leo XIII), and the marble relief on the Evening Star Building. Outside of Washington, James F. Earley was especially known for his work on the U.S. Government Building at the St. Louis Exposition of 1904. Other works of James F. Earley include ornamental detail on the U. S. Custom House in Baltimore; a fountain at the U.S. Custom House at the Lewis and Clark Centennial in Portland, Oregon; a garland on the U. S. Post Office in Cumberland, Maryland, and Eagles for lamps at the U. S. Post Office in Salem, Oregon (The Washington Architectural Club Catalog 1901, 1903 and 1906). James Farrington Earley's last known work was a memorial at the United States Military Academy at West Point.

Earley's sculpture for Grace Reformed Church included much of the stone ornamentation on the exterior of the building, including the carved tympanums above the central door and two side doors; the figure supporting the banner of Frederick, the Elector of the Palatinate; the shields located at either side of the central door, and the heads of the Knight and Burgher serving as label-stops. Paul Pelz praised Earley's work and was pleased at learning "that you [the Chairman of the Building Committee] are pleased with my endeavor to make your church the most artistic in the city" (Letter from Paul Pelz to Mr. Slagle, February 9, 1903). The sculptural work on the church was entirely completed, at a discount rate of $1,000.00, by early April, 1903.

== Architecture ==
Designed in the Late Gothic Revival style, Grace Reformed Church is rectangular in plan with vertical emphasis given by its soaring towers and spires. The church sits upon a granite base and measures 52 feet wide and 71 feet high. It is constructed of Cleveland greystone with much sculptural ornamentation decorating the facade. The facade of the church is three bays wide and fronts 15th Street, while the side (south elevation), consisting of two end gables connected by five bays, extends along the alley.

The 15th Street facade consists of a tall, projecting bay with a gable roof flanked by two, shorter side bays covered with cross gable roofs. Octagonal towers topped with delicate spires located at the corners of the central bay articulate this central element and provide a vertical emphasis to the church. A door with a pointed arch pediment is located on center of the central bay with small, pointed arch side lights flanking it. The tympanum above the door is in relief and depicts the Ascension of Christ. Two sculpted Shields representing Geneva and Zurich appear above the side lights. Above the central door and occupying the entire width of the central bay is a large, five-paneled, stained glass tracery window. The window is enclosed within a pointed arch label-molding with label-stops sculpted in the form of two heads representing a burgher and a knight. Above the central window and within the gable is a pointed arch niche within which rests a figure supporting the shield of Frederick, the Elector of the Palatinate, and symbol of the Reformed Church. A sculpted electorate cross terminates the top of the gable, while the spires of the corner towers project slightly higher.

The two side bays are identical. Both consist of a central door with carved tympanums, and stained glass, rose windows above, all set within a pointed arch surround. Blind galleries surmount the pointed arch and form a frieze below the cornice line. Square buttresses in plan terminate the ends of the church and extend from the ground to slightly above the roof line of the end bays. Niches are located at the midpoint and at the top of the buttresses. A copper gutter and a copper ridge line are visible at the roof level of the end bays. The South elevation facing the wide alley consists of two gables, one at the west end, the other at the east end, connected by five identical bays, two stories in height. The west bay is part of the church building itself, while the east bay represents the facade of the Sunday School Building, constructed after the completion of the sanctuary. The west gable is pierced by a tracery window, composed of two paneled lancet windows with a rose window above. Sculpted panels of blind arcading interrupt the lancets at a level one-third the height of the window. Pointed label moulds with carved label-stops surround the tracery to protect the windows from the weather.

The five bays connecting the east and west gabled ends are identical except for the fifth bay from the west which holds a door at its ground level. Each bay, separated by pilasters, contains a tracery window. Projecting modillions support an unornamented frieze and cornice. These bays are covered with a gable roof supporting three copper dormers with ornamental hoods.

The entrance to the church occurs on center at the 15th Street elevation. A small, wood-paneled entry vestibule opens onto the central aisle of the church with the raised altar at the east end adjacent to a raised choir stand slightly to its north. The doors on either side of the central entrance similarly open onto an extension of the wooden entry vestibule, leading church goers up the stairs to the balcony level, or onto the main floor. A wide, contoured balcony, supported by cast iron columns, extends the entire width of the church across the west end. Two groups of pews are located to either side of a central aisle at the balcony level.

The interior of the church is a large, open area with a central aisle and very narrow side aisles located between the pews and end walls. The central nave of the church soars a full three stories high, terminating at the raised altar at the east end. The east wall of the altar holds a Sacramental mosaic, beyond a high arch supported by clustered columns with foliated capitals. The sides, vaulted at a lower level than the central aisle, are separated from it by a wooden entablature extending from the altar to the balcony. Wooden ribs, at each bay, extend from the entablature and follow the vaulted ceiling of the aisles to rest on sculpted brackets of stone on the exterior end walls. The brackets are visually supported by pilasters which also serve to delineate the separate bays of the side elevations. The south and west walls display the lancet windows of stained glass. The north wall has two lancets with no glazing (where the north wall of the church is abutting the south wall of the Parish house), and two lancets with stained glass windows. There are a total of eight stained glass windows in the church presenting a series of scenes from the life of Christ, beginning, along the south wall of the church, with the visit of the Magi at His birth, and culminating, at the large, five-paneled lancet window on center of the west wall, with the Ascension of Christ. The window artistry was done by Conroy and Prugh of Pittsburgh, Pennsylvania.

=== The Sunday School ===
The Sunday School Building, abutting the church at its east end, is rectangular in plan, measuring 72 feet long and 35 feet 5½ inches wide.

The east gable of the south elevation of the church, and facade of the Sunday School Building, is covered with Cleveland greystone and repeats the style and elements of the west gable of the church, but in a manner more appropriate to the school's function. The east gable, 3½ stories tall, is divided into three parts, consisting of a slightly projecting central portion rising to the apex of the gable and flanked by wings. The entire gabled bay is highly fenestrated, not with tracery windows, but with casement windows at each level. Six sculpted tympanums with the names of important Reformed Church leaders appear above the window openings of the Sunday School Building. The names of "Zwingli" and "Calvin", the founders of the Reformed Church, are carved in the tympanums of the windows located on the third floor of the center bay with two fish sculpted next to them. The fish was a popular symbol of Christianity because the five letters of the Greek word for fish are the initials for the expression "Jesus Christ, son of God Savior". The names of "Bullinger" and "Beza", the successors of Zwingli and Calvin in Zurich and Geneva, appear at the second floor level in the side bays of the Sunday School facade. At the basement level of the central bay are the names of the authors of the Reformed Church Catechism, "Ursinus", the theologian, and "Olevianus", the court preacher at Heidelberg. Small rectangular openings are located at the gable above the Chi-Rho sculpture, a symbol associated with the Roman Emperor Constantine and his becoming a Christian in the fourth century. A highly ornate finial tops the apex of the gable. Piers decorated with pointed arch niches, as found on the front facade of the church, buttress the edges of the central portion and ends of the wings of this east gable.

The east side elevation of the Sunday School Building faces a narrow, 10-foot alley. This elevation, not visible to the public, is brick, with no sculptural decoration. The elevation is not completely unornamented, however, as the casement windows of the first and second floors are recessed within pointed arches extending the full two stories. The third floor similarly has casement windows but which are flush with the facade.

The north rear elevation of the Sunday School Building faces the rear parking area directly behind the Parish House next door. This elevation, also of brick, has a central gable and two end chimneys. The third level is fenestrated with four casement windows flush with the facade, while recessed windows at the first and second levels (infilled with brick on the first floor) are set within five separate, pointed arches. Small, rectangular, fixed windows appear at the attic level of the gable. Two brick chimneys, on either side of the gable, terminate the ends of this east elevation.

The interior of the Sunday School Building can be accessed from either the door on the exterior facade, or from an interior door located at the back wall of the sanctuary. Both of these doors open onto an entry vestibule which in turn opens onto a foyer. From the foyer, a set of double doors lead into the "Roosevelt Room" and stairs ascend to the conference room and Sunday School classrooms.

The Roosevelt Room, which is used for meetings and social events, is square in plan and incorporates into its east side wall the cornerstone of the original Grace Reformed Church Chapel on this same site. A vitrine contains Theodore Roosevelt memorabilia.

The conference room, rectangular in plan, extends a full two stories in height with a balcony level consisting of the Sunday School class rooms. A central, wooden speaker's platform is located at the west end of the room with movable seating in front. A semicircular balcony level, located above the platform, is accessed by wooden stairs at either side of the speaker's podium. A narrow walkway is located between the balcony railing and the irregularly shaped classrooms divided off behind. The classrooms, placed in the poche, formed by the intersection of the semicircle and the rectangle, are partitioned by rolling slat doors. The design of this classroom and conference area is referred to as "Akron-style", since the first Sunday School of this type, designed in the late 1860s by Lewis Miller, was built in Akron, Ohio.

=== Parish House ===
The Parish House is a three-story brick structure with a two-story projecting bay. The central entrance door and vestibule is located next to the bay, towards the north end. The projecting bay has paired rectangular windows with a segmental transom light above on the first floor, and paired, segmental arched windows on the second floor. A segmental arched window is located at the second floor of the main block, while three rectangular windows are located at the third floor. The central window is covered with a triangular brick pediment and the side windows have jack arches. Decorative string courses are located at each of the levels and inset brick panels can be found between the basement and first floor and between the first floor and the second floors. The cornice of both the projecting bay and main block is corbelled and supports a flat roof.
