= New Hazlett Theater =

Theater in Pittsburgh, Pennsylvania, US

Coordinates: 40.453095°N 80.005295°W

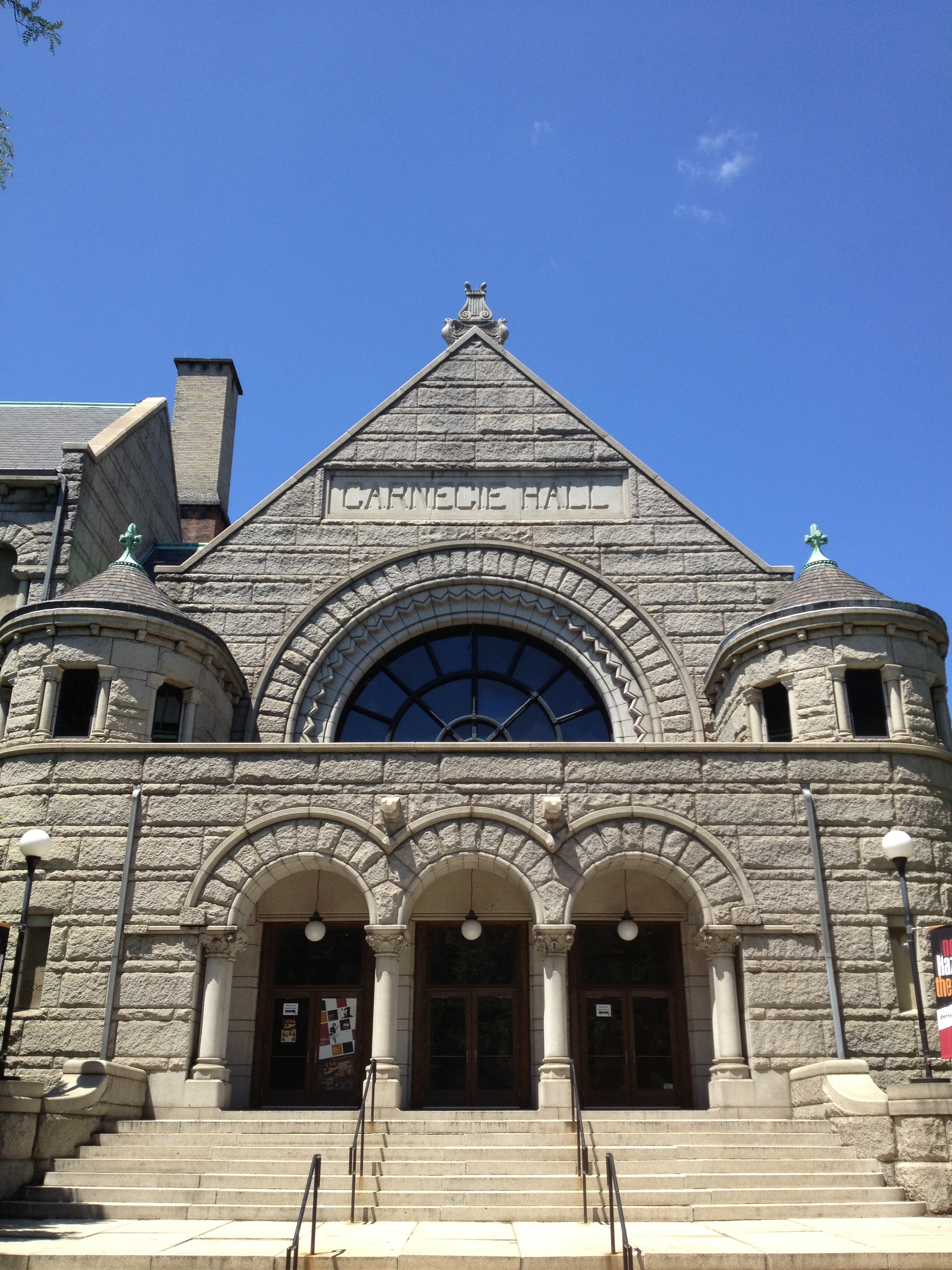
- Interactive map of New Hazlett Theater
- Address: 6 Allegheny Square E Pittsburgh, Pennsylvania; United States
- Capacity: 500

Construction
- Opened: 2004

Website
- newhazletttheater.org

The New Hazlett Theater is the primary occupant of the Carnegie Free Library of Allegheny in the Allegheny Center part of Pittsburgh, Pennsylvania. After the Pittsburgh Public Theater moved to the O'Reilly Theater in 1999, the Hazlett Theater was transformed into the New Hazlett Theater and opened in 2004. Since 2013, the Theater has also been home to the Community Supported Art (CSA) Performance Series, designed to help support new and upcoming artists in the Pittsburgh area.

== History ==
The Carnegie Free Library of Allegheny featured the first Carnegie Music Hall in the United States. The Theatre was renovated in 1967 with community-raised money when it was under threat of demolition. In 1980, it was renamed the Hazlett Theater in honor of Theodore L. Hazlett Jr. The Hazlett Theater served as the home to Pittsburgh Public Theater For 24 seasons from 1974 until 1999 when the PPT moved to the O'Reilly Theater. Due to the decline of traffic, the local arts community supported the rebirth of the Hazlett Theater as the New Hazlett Theater in 2004, where it serves as a valued community resource for performing artists in the Pittsburgh area.

=== Community Supported Art (CSA) Series ===
Since 2013, the New Hazlett Theater CSA Performance Series has brought over 234 new and emerging artists to the stage. Spanning genres such as dance, music, original plays, musicals and experimental animation.

2013

- Kelli Stevens Kane: Big George
- Miniature Curiosa: Birds of America
- Special CSA Workshop: merrygogo
- Continuum Dance Theatre: Objects of DESIRE

2014

- Dane Wilcox: Onward to Mars
- Wavemakers
- Eclectic Laboratory Chamber Orchestra: The Radiophonic Fantasies
- Maree ReMalia: The Ubiquitous Mass of Us
- Frederico Garcia-De Castro: Livre Pour Deux Pianos (Book for Two Pianos)
- Moriah Ella Mason: Contained
- Jennifer Meridian: Translations

2015

- Jil Sifel and Ben Sota: WaywardLand
- Anya Martin & JH: Mechanics of a Legend
- Teena Marie Custer & Roberta Guido: My Good Side & RETREAD/together/apart
- David Bernabo: The Reduction
- Matthew Tembo Chachacha
- Anthony Williams: Loving Black

2016

- Ricardo Iamuuri: A BRAND NEW WORLD: kill the artist
- Trillium Ensemble: The Silent Spring Project
- slowdanger: memory 4
- Cole Hoyer-Winfield: midnight in Molina
- Tameka Cage Conley, PhD & Jason Mendez, PhD: Redemption - Sons

2017

- Anqwenique Wingfield & Julie Mallis: A Love Supreme
- Lindsay Fisher: Over Exposed
- Monteze Freeland: Kalopsia
- Clare Drobot & Nathan Zoob: Between Us and Grace
- John Petrucelli: Presence

2018

- H. Gene Thompson, Arvid Tomayko, Anna Azizzy, & Ru Emmons: Apart from Me
- Carl Anonowicz: Büer’s Kiss
- Double Blind Productions: Escape Velocity
- Afro Yaqui Music Collective: Migrant Liberation Movement Suite
- Felicia Cooper: Porto Domi

2019

- Ali Hoefnagel: You Can Call Me Al
- Kasia Reilly: Dolina
- Kamratōn: Her Holiness, The Winter Dog
- Brittney Chantele: A Fire on Venus
- Anna Azizzy: The Secret Life of Gym Girls

2020

- Philip Wesley Gates: Terminer
- Gil Teizeira: The Mind-Body Problem
- Dave English & Will Schutze: The Dragon of Polish Hill

2021

- Nick Navari: Local Singles
- Kaylin Horgan: Milton
- Samuel Boateng: Sunsum is Spirit
- Dr. HollyHood & Jon Quest: Quest and the Girl with the Yellow Jacket
- Tlaloc Rivas: The Revolution of Evelyn Serrano
- Bryce Rabideau: Meanwhile
- NaTasha Thompson: Lavender Terrace

2022

- Princess Jafar: The Princess is Right!
- Feralcat: Disassembly
- Bailey Lee: Papa
- Vida Chai: Somewhere Strange
- Nathan Wagner: Perdita

2023

- YS1 (Yusef Shelton da First): IGNITE
- Jasmine Roth: Painting Lessons
- Kelly Trumbull: Morning Reckoning
- Brian Pope: Himbos
- Yan Pang: One-Log Bridge

2024

- Melannie Taylor: Teaira Whitehead
- Kontara Morphis: UNDERLAND x Alice
- Lindsay Gornason: Apis

2025

- Anna King Skeels: My Sister's Lipstick
- Ramin Akhavijou: Ego
- Joanna Abel: Dragonfly Dawn
- Christine CMC Bethea: Birthday at Tiffany's
