= First African New Church =

Historic church in Washington, D.C., United States

- U.S. National Register of Historic Places
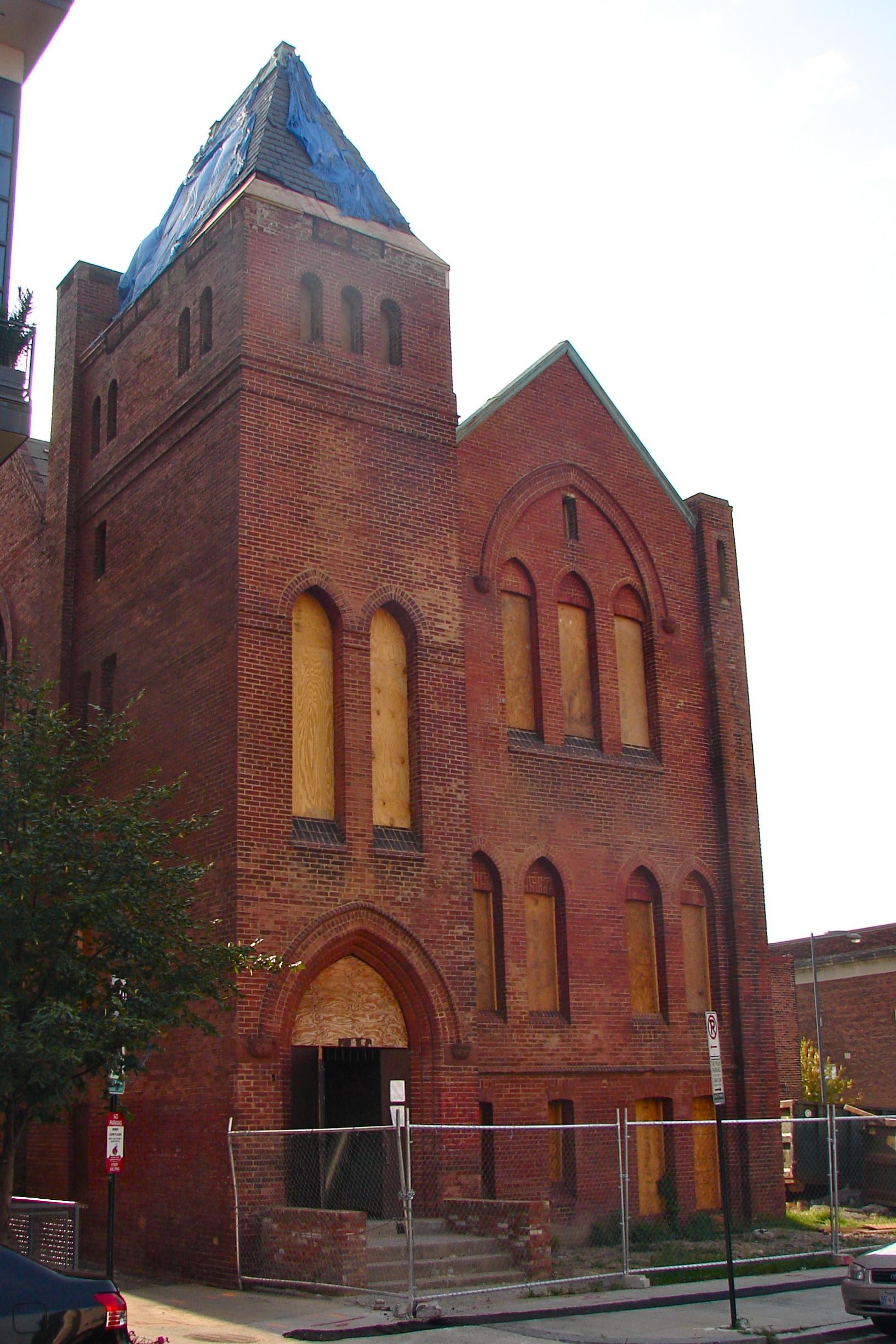

- Location within Washington, D.C.
- Location: 2105-07 10th St., Washington, DC
- Coordinates: 38°55′6″N 77°1′33″W
- Area: 0.2 acres (0.081 ha)
- Built: 1896
- Architect: Paul J. Pelz
- Architectural style: Gothic Revival
- NRHP reference No.: 08001375
- Added to NRHP: January 29, 2009

First African New Church (also known as People's Seventh Day Adventist Church and People's Seventh Day Baptist Independent Church) is a historic church, located at 2105-07 10th St., Northwest, Washington, D.C., U.S., in the Cardozo-Shaw neighborhood.

== History ==
It was built in 1896 on a design by Paul J. Pelz, for the Swedenborgian-Colored congregation. In 1903, the Peoples Seventh Day Adventist moved in. They changed their name to Peoples Seventh Day Baptist Independent Church, in 1937. It was vacant in 1970. It was designated a DC Historic Landmark in 2001 and added to the National Register of Historic Places on January 29, 2009. Architect and developer Sorg Associates bought the building for $1,300,000, in 2003, and announced plans to develop 39 condominiums on the parcel.

In 2016, Mayor Muriel Bowser announced plans to convert the building into one of eight facilities for homeless around the District.
