= Swartzell, Rheem and Hensey Company Building =

Building in Washington DC, United States

Coordinates: 38°53′58.6″N 77°2′0″W

The Swartzell, Rheem and Hensey Company Building is a neo-classical building on 727 15th Street NW, Washington DC. It was designed by architect Paul J. Pelz in 1907 for a local brokerage firm, which neighbored other brokers in this section of 15th Street neighboring the US Treasury.

In 1948 the building was converted into a movie theater and renamed Playhouse Theater. The theater closed in the early 1980s and an apartment block was built above what had until then been a low-rise building.
