= Paul J. Pelz =

American architect (1841–1918)

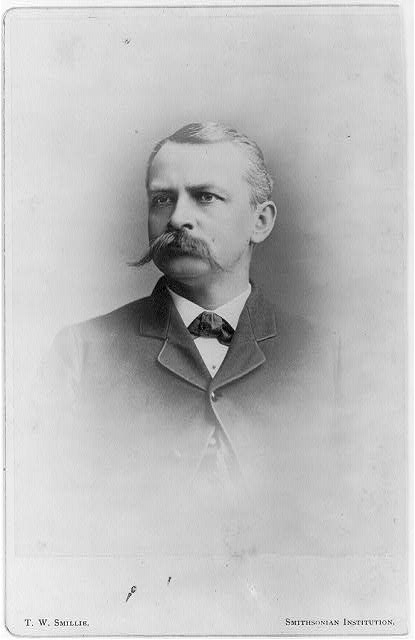
- Born: 18 November 1841; Seitendorf, Silesia
- Died: 30 March 1918 (aged 76); Washington, D.C., U.S.
- Resting place: Oak Hill Cemetery; Washington, D.C., U.S.
- Occupation: Architect
- Buildings: Library of Congress and Healy Hall, Georgetown University in Washington, D.C. and Carnegie Library (now Hazlett Theater), in Pittsburgh\\

Paul Johannes Pelz (18 November 1841 – 30 March 1918) was a German-American architect, best known as the main architect of the Library of Congress in Washington D.C.

== Early life and education ==
Pelz was born November 18, 1841, in Seitendorf (now Poniatów), in Waldenburg, Silesia, now part of Poland. His father, Eduard Pelz, was elected as a representative of Silesia to the Frankfurt Parliament in 1848. Subsequent political repression led him to emigrate to the U.S. in 1851 while the rest of the family temporarily stayed in Breslau, where Paul studied at the colleges of St. Elizabeth and Holy Spirit.

== Career ==
In 1858, Paul Pelz joined his father in New York City, and served there as apprentice to architect Detlef Lienau. In 1864, he was employed as chief draftsman by Jewish architect Henry Fernbach, who designed the Central Synagogue in New York City. In 1866, Pelz became a member of the American Institute of Architects.

In 1867, he moved to Washington, D.C., and was engaged as a civil engineer for the United States Lighthouse Board, where from 1872 to 1877 he served as chief draftsman. His work won a prize for the Lighthouse Board at the 1873 Universal Exhibition in Vienna.

In 1873, Pelz and John L. Smithmeyer, another Washington, D.C.–based architect, together won the competition for the architectural plans for the Library of Congress. Their winning design proposal was partly based on notes Pelz had taken on prominent public libraries when he traveled to Europe to collect the prize in Vienna. In the ensuing years Pelz also partnered with Smithmeyer on other projects. The difficulties experienced on the Library of Congress project, with many delays for congressional dithering, eventually strained their collaboration. In 1888 Pelz became the lead architect for the Library of Congress as Smithmeyer was dismissed; Pelz in turn was dismissed in 1892 and succeeded by Edward Pearce Casey. Pelz had the main role in the design of the building and the execution of its exterior, while Smithmeyer was instrumental in securing the commission and Casey supervised most of the interior finishings.

Pelz's offices were in the Corcoran Building on 15th and F Street NW, which hosted several prominent architecture firms, now the site of the Hotel W near the US Treasury Building. He designed churches, public buildings, private houses and commercial buildings, and also participated in key debates of the time on Washington's urban design. In 1887, while still in partnership with Smithmeyer, he proposed an exuberant neo-medieval design for a new memorial bridge across the Potomac in honor of Ulysses S. Grant, a predecessor plan to the Arlington Memorial Bridge which was eventually built in the 1930s. In 1898, at the request of socialite Mary Foote Henderson, he proposed designs for a new Executive Mansion to replace the White House on what is now Meridian Hill Park. Pelz was a prominent participant in the 1900 Convention of the American Institute of Architects and presented a plan there for the remodeling of the National Mall which was a key source of the McMillan Plan the following year.

== Personal life ==
Pelz's first wife, Louise Dorothea Kipp, died in 1894. In 1895, he remarried with Mary Eastbourne (Ritter) Meem (1849–1914).

== Death ==
On 30 March 1918, he died in Washington, D.C. He is buried together with his second wife in Oak Hill Cemetery in Washington, D.C.

== Style ==
Like other architects of his time, Pelz mastered a range of architectural styles and was willing to switch across them depending on program and client's taste. His designs included Romanesque Revival (Carnegie Library of Allegheny, McGill Building, Memorial Bridge project), Gothic Revival (Antietam Cemetery gatehouse, Hot Springs Hospital, Grace Reformed Church), a hodgepodge of Neo-Medieval styles at Georgetown University's Healy Hall, French Renaissance (Miller House), Neo-Georgian (Elkins Mansion), American Federal (University of Virginia), Stick Style (several lighthouses, US Soldiers' Home Library), and Beaux-Arts (Library of Congress, Foraker Mansion, Meridian Hill Executive Mansion project). For the Library of Congress project alone, Pelz provided alternative designs in styles that included Romanesque, 13th-Century Gothic, Victorian Gothic, Italian Renaissance, French Renaissance, German Renaissance, and French Classical.

== Works ==
=== Lighthouses ===
- St. Augustine Lighthouse, St. Augustine, Florida, 1871
- Bodie Island Light near Nags Head, North Carolina, 1872
- Sand Island Light, mouth of Mobile Bay, Alabama, 1873
- Mare Island Light, San Pablo Bay, California, 1873 (demolished in the 1930s)
- Point Fermin Light, San Pedro, California, 1874
- East Brother Island Light, Richmond, California, 1874
- Hereford Inlet Light, North Wildwood, New Jersey, 1874
- Point Hueneme Light, Santa Barbara Channel, California, 1874 (replaced in 1940)
- Currituck Beach Light, Corolla, North Carolina, 1875
- Point Adams Light, Columbia River mouth, Washington State, 1875 (demolished in 1912)
- Morris Island Light near Charleston, South Carolina, 1876

=== Life saving stations ===
- Deal, New Jersey, 1883
- Atlantic City, New Jersey, 1884
- Brenton Point, Newport, Rhode Island, 1884 (destroyed by the 1938 New England hurricane)
- Bay Head, New Jersey, 1885

=== Other ===
- Keepers Lodge, Antietam National Cemetery, Sharpsburg, Maryland, 1867
- Thomas Jefferson Building, Library of Congress, initially with John L. Smithmeyer, Washington D.C., 1873 (winning competition entry), 1886-1892 (architectural design and construction)
- Beautification of the Wisconsin Avenue Reservoir built in 1859 by Montgomery C. Meigs, Washington D.C., 1875; demolished in 1932
- Healy Hall and Riggs Memorial Library, Georgetown University (with Smithmeyer), Washington D.C., 1875–1879
- US Soldiers' Home Library, Washington D.C., 1877; demolished in 1910
- George Henry Thomas Monument, with sculptor John Quincy Adams Ward, Washington, D.C. 1879
- Mansion of William H. Emory (with Smithmeyer), 1301 Connecticut Avenue NW, Washington DC, early 1880s; demolished in 1917
- Army and Navy General Hospital (with Smithmeyer), Hot Springs, Arkansas, 1884–1887; demolished in 1931
- Carnegie Free Library of Allegheny (now New Hazlett Theater, with Smithmeyer), Pittsburgh, Pennsylvania, 1886–1890
- The first Chamberlin Hotel (with Smithmeyer), Fort Monroe, Virginia, 1888–1896; destroyed by fire in 1920
- McGill Building, 908-914 G Street NW, Washington DC, 1891; demolished in 1973
- Mansion for Senator Stephen B. Elkins, 1626 K Street NW, Washington D.C., 1892–1896; demolished in 1937
- House of W.B. Whaley, 26 Legare Street, Charleston, South Carolina, 1895; radically altered in the 1930s
- Church of the Holy City, now Emanuel Swedenborg Center, as supervising architect on a design by H. Langford Warren, 1611 16th Street NW, Washington D.C., 1894–1896
- House on 3440 34th Place, Washington D.C., with Frederick W. Carlyle, designed for developer John Sherman to launch the Cleveland Park residential neighborhood, 1895
- First African New Church, Washington DC, 1896; abandoned since 1992
- General Winfield Scott Hancock Memorial, with sculptor Henry Jackson Ellicott, Washington D.C., 1896
- Mansion for Senator Joseph B. Foraker, 1500 16th Street NW, Washington DC, 1897; demolished in 1960
- Randall Hall, the University of Virginia, Charlottesville, Virginia, 1898–99
- University of Virginia Hospital, Charlottesville, Virginia, 1899-1901 and additions in 1904-05 and 1906–07
- Hall of Christ, Chautauqua Institution, Chautauqua, New York, 1899–1909
- Miller House, 2201 Massachusetts Avenue NW, Washington D.C., 1900–01
- Townhouse on 2238 Q Street NW, Washington DC, 1901
- Grace Reformed Church, Washington DC, with A.A. Richter, 1901–1903
- Machinery Hall, Louisiana Purchase Exposition, St. Louis, Missouri, 1903–04; demolished after the exhibition
- Building 100 (apartments for bachelor officers, 90 Ingalls Road) and Buildings 101, 102 and 103 (housing for senior officers, 55-65 Ingalls Road), Fort Monroe, Hampton, Virginia, 1906
- Swartzell, Rheem and Hensey Company Building, 727 15th Street NW, Washington D.C., 1907–08; later Playhouse Theater, 1948–1984
- Grace Reformed Church Sunday School, Washington D.C., 1911–1912

== Gallery ==
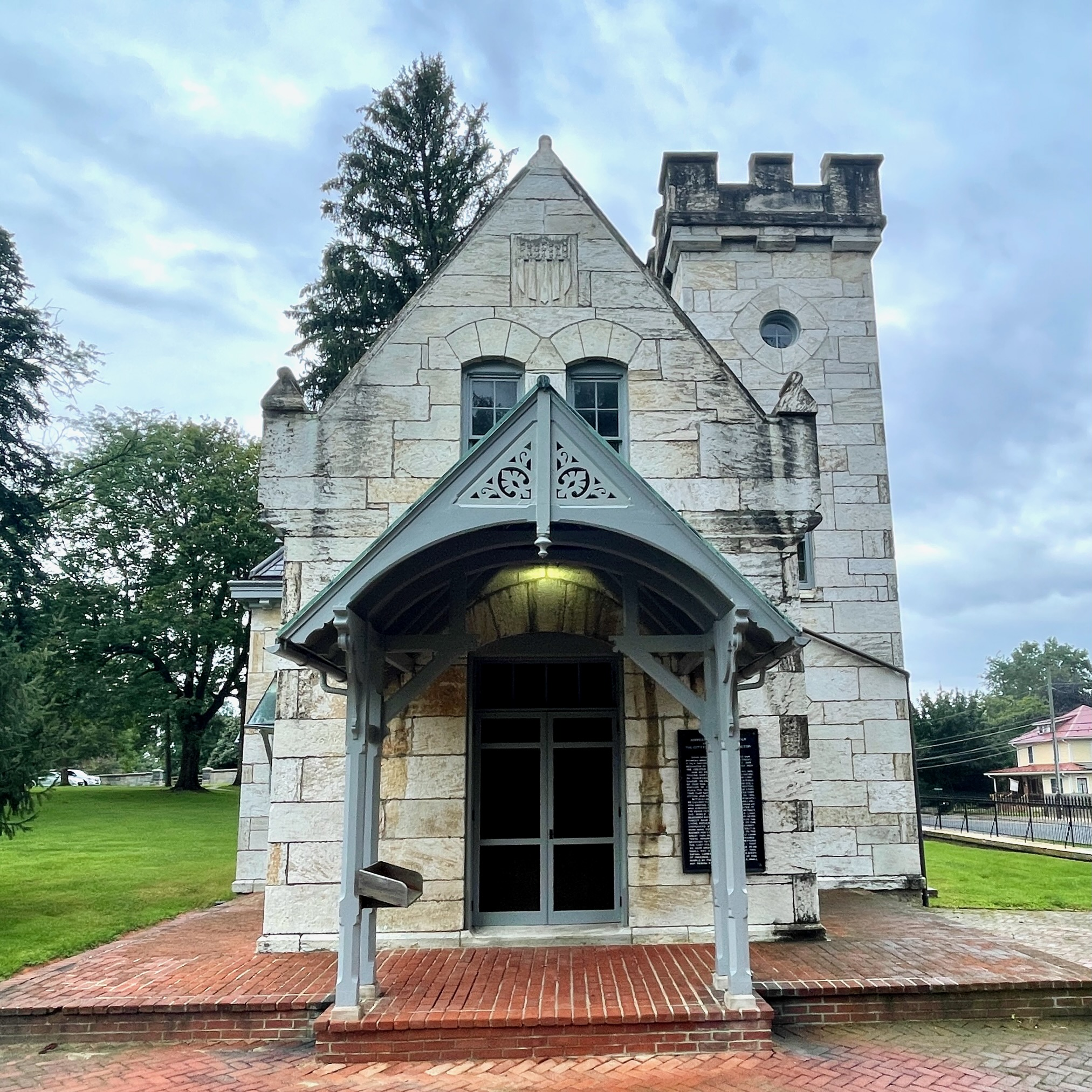
Antietam National Cemetery Gatehouse, 1867

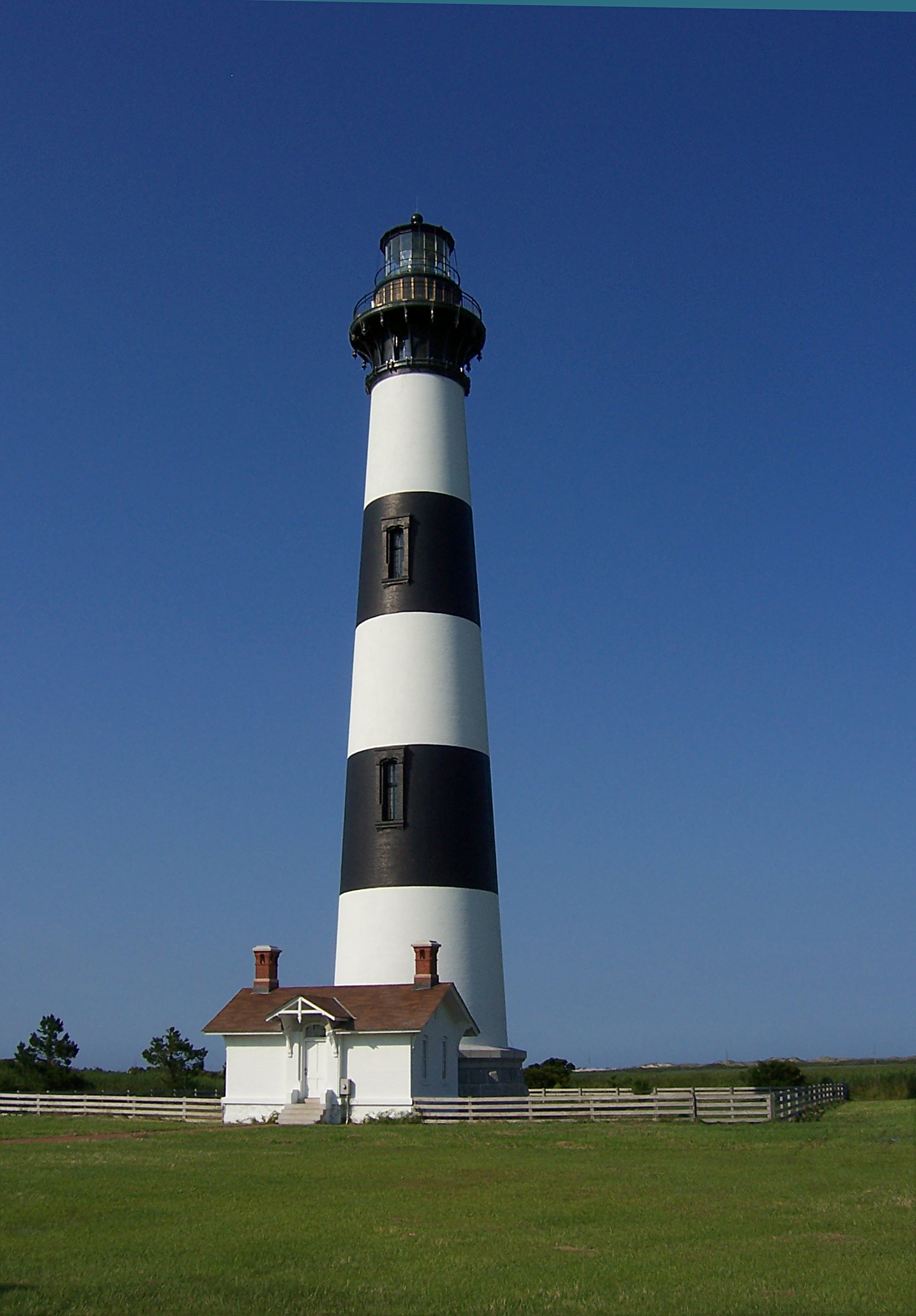
Bodie Island Lighthouse

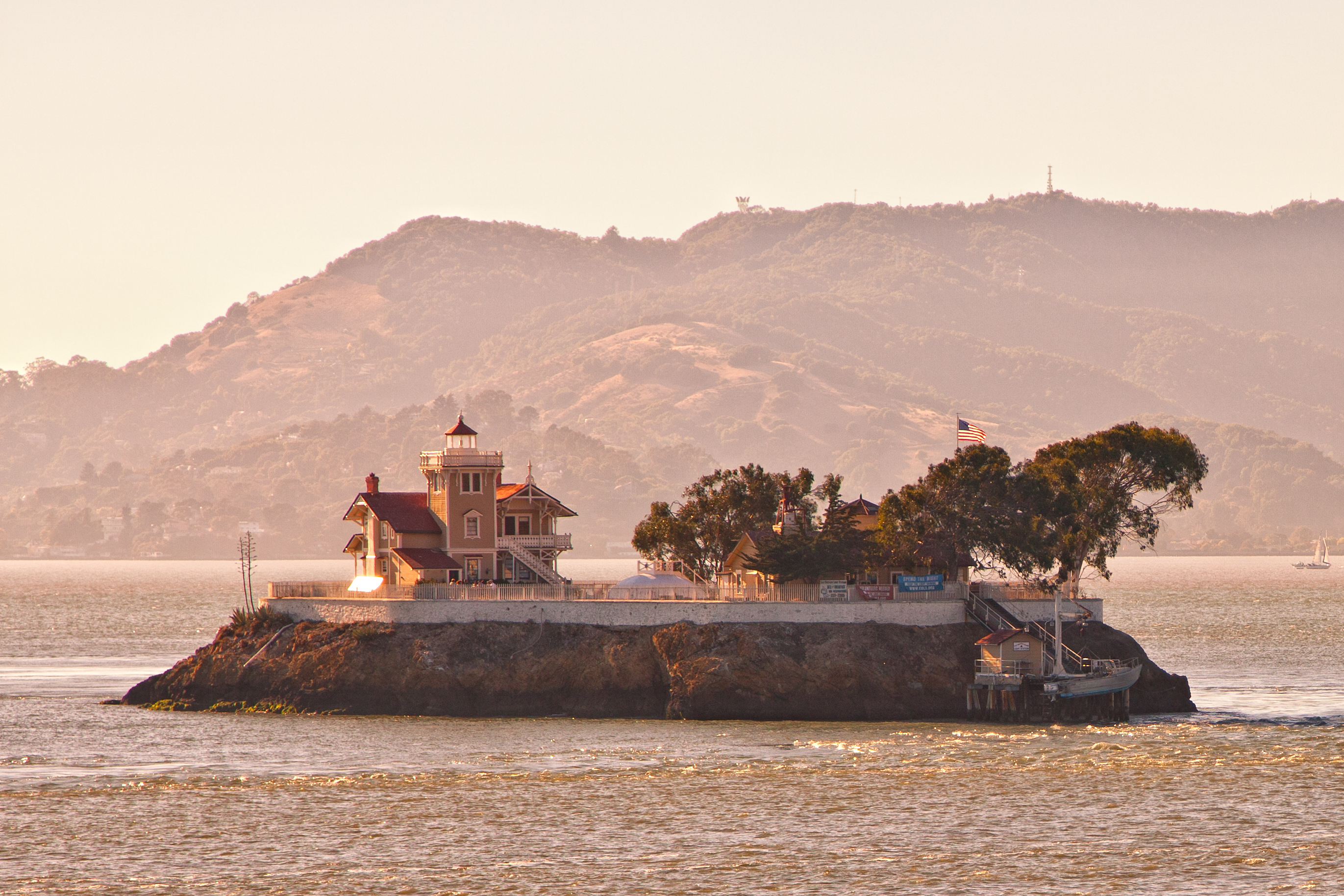
East Brother Lighthouse

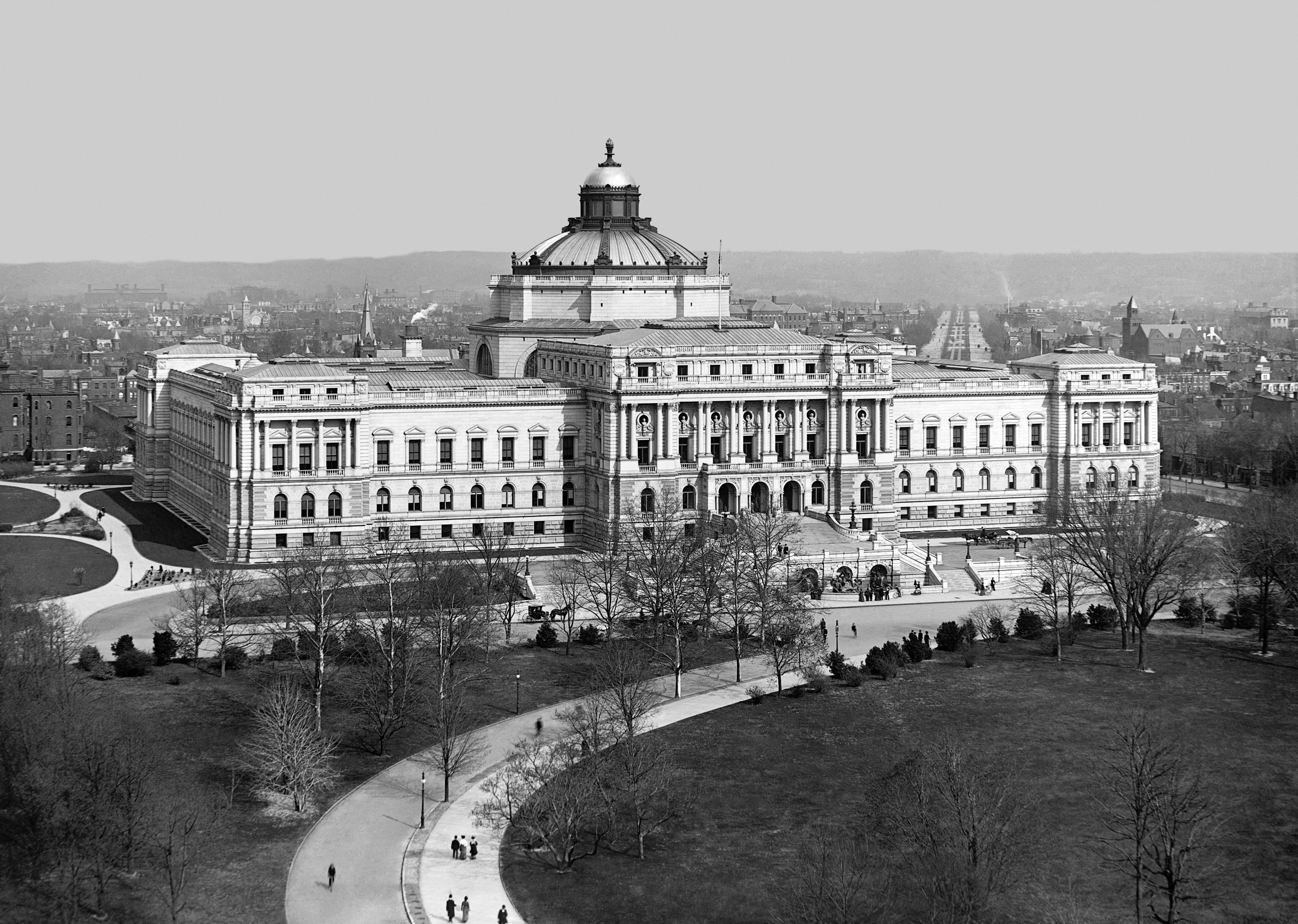
Library of Congress, view c. 1902

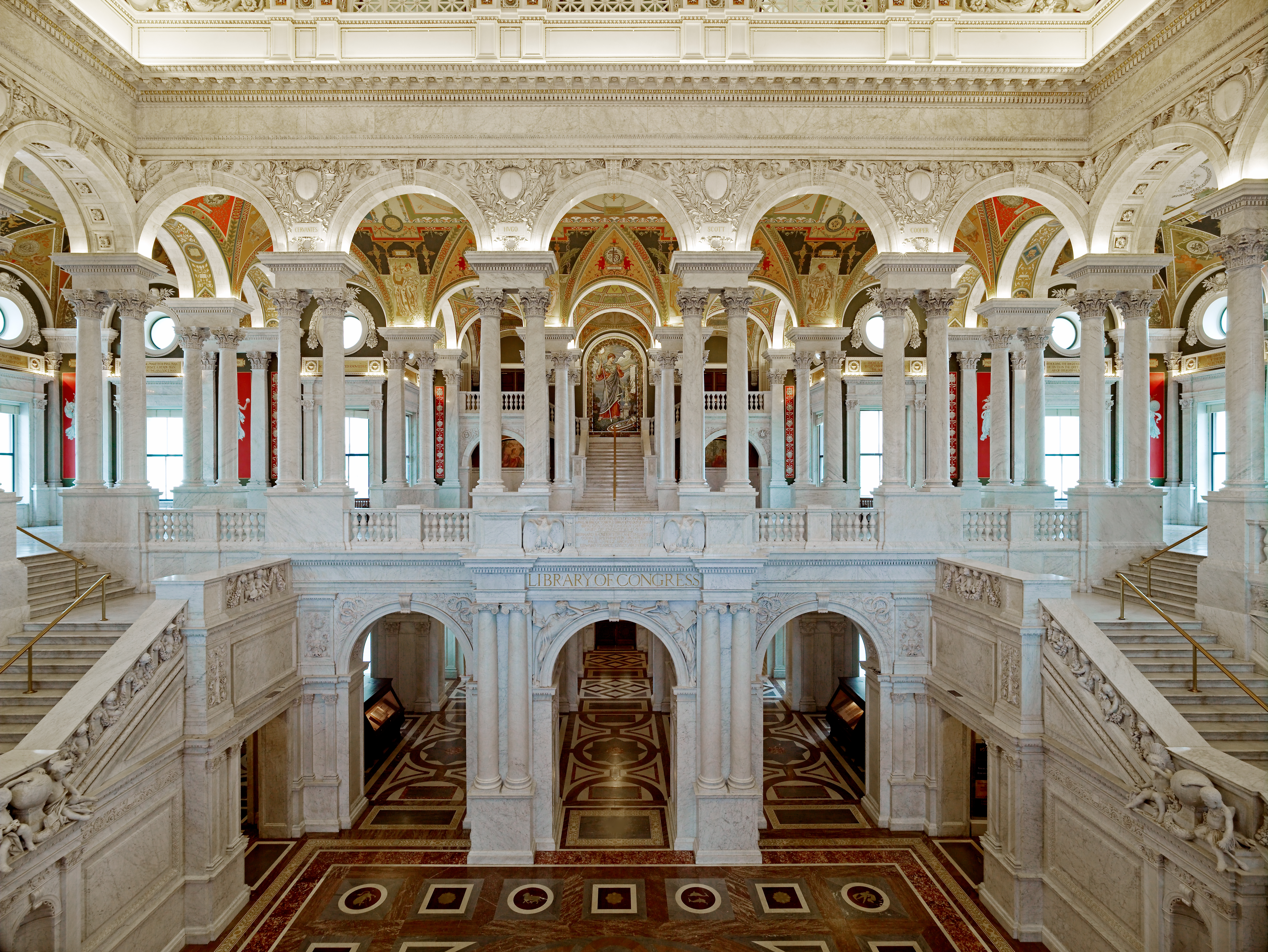
Library of Congress, Great Hall

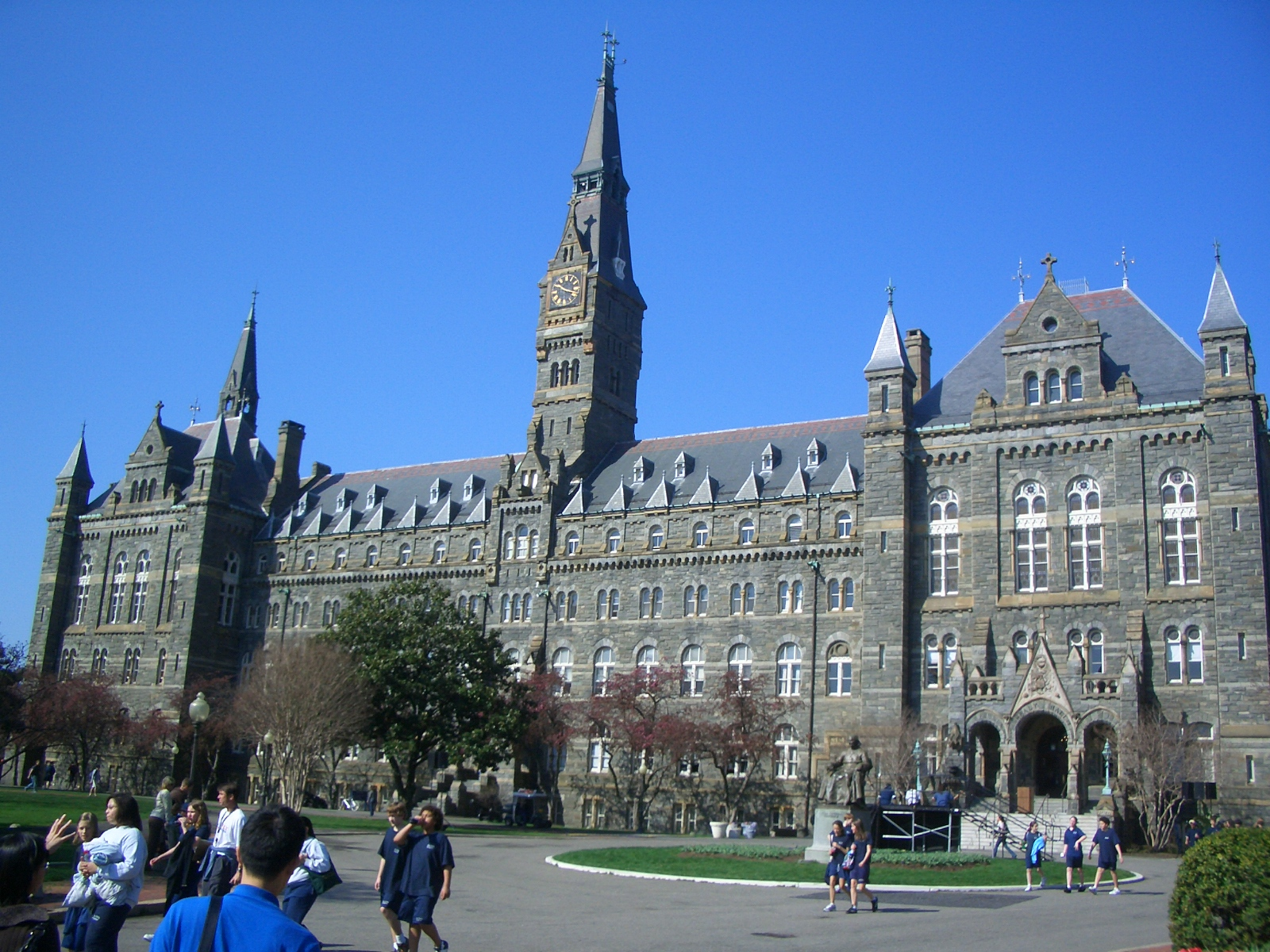
Healy Hall, Georgetown University

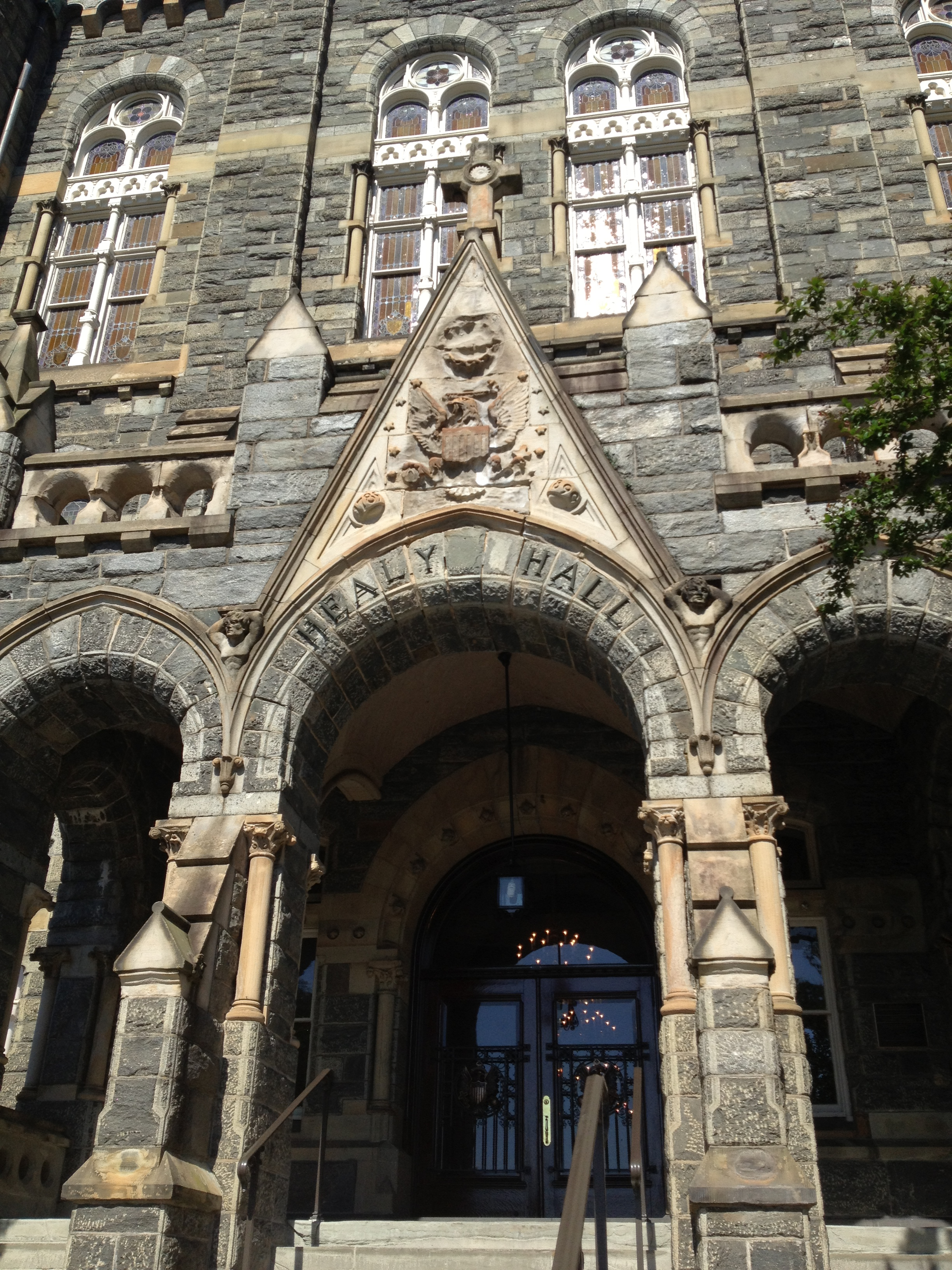
Healy Hall, main entrance

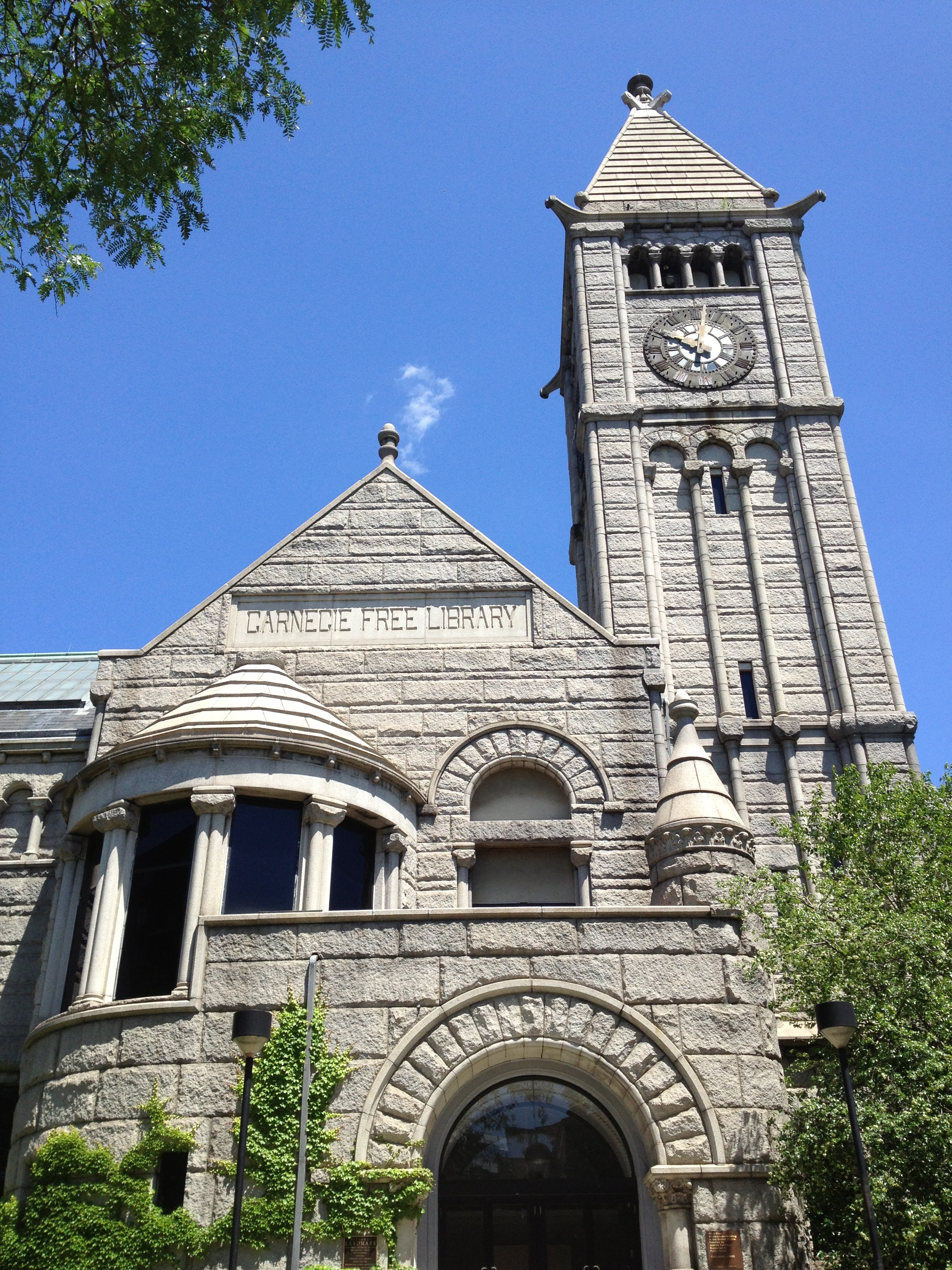
Carnegie Free Library of Allegheny, Pittsburgh

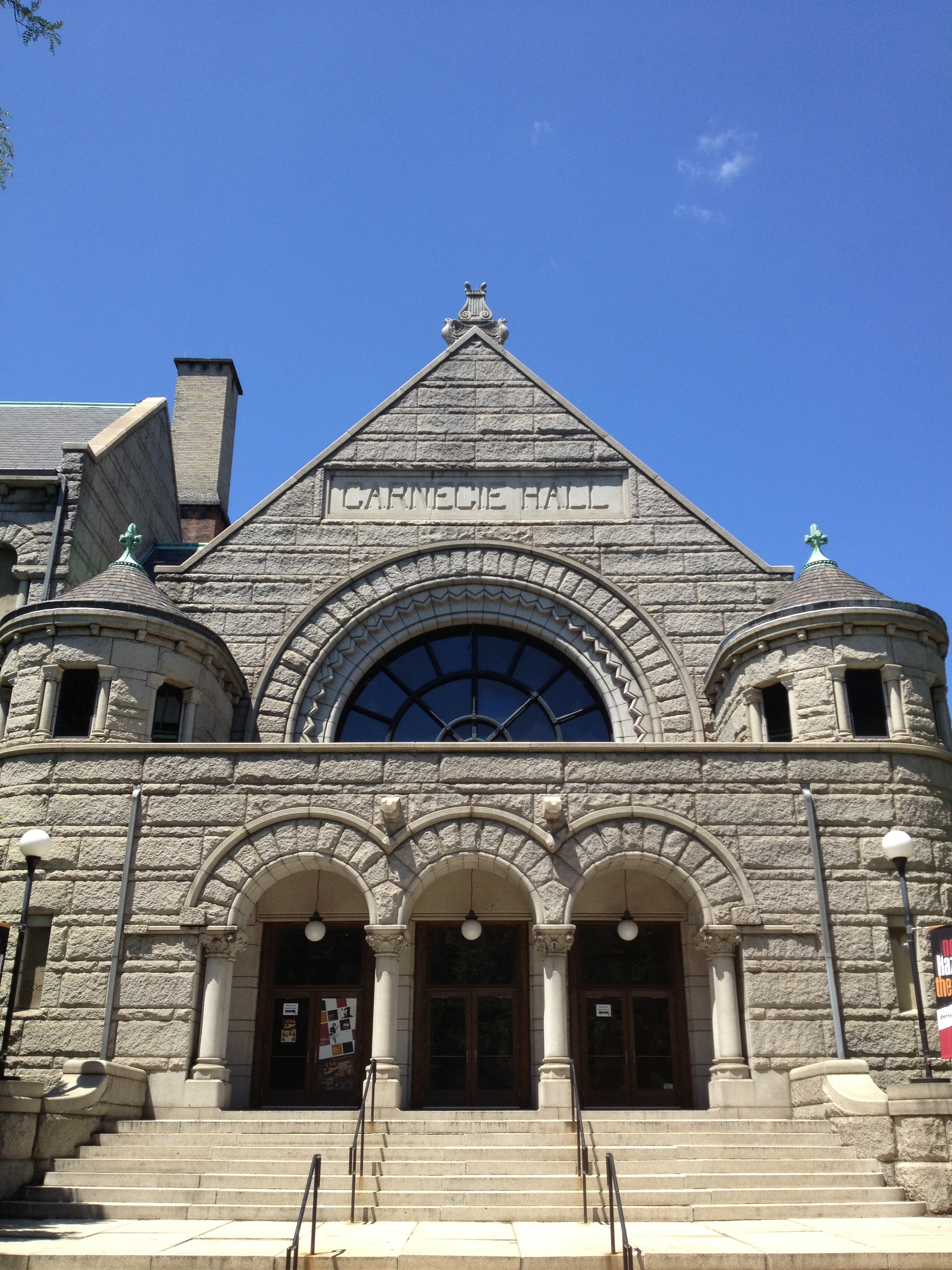
Carnegie Free Library of Allegheny, Hall entrance (now New Hazlett Theater)

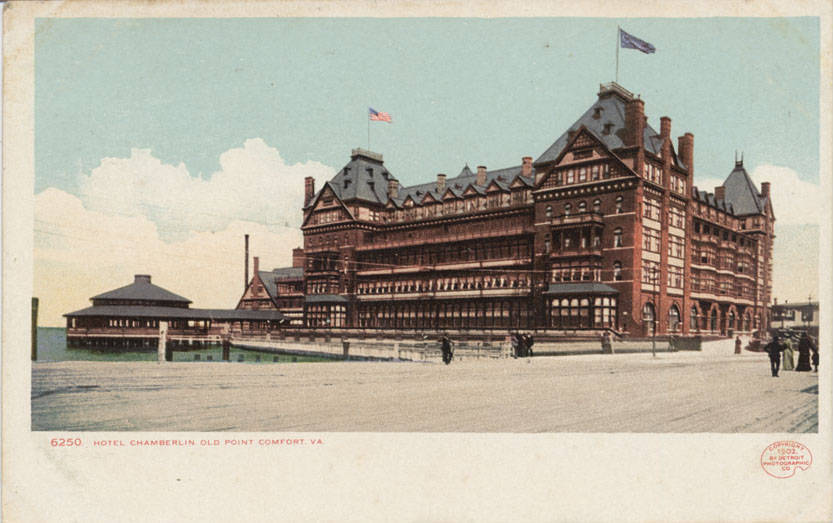
Chamberlin Hotel, Old Point Comfort VA

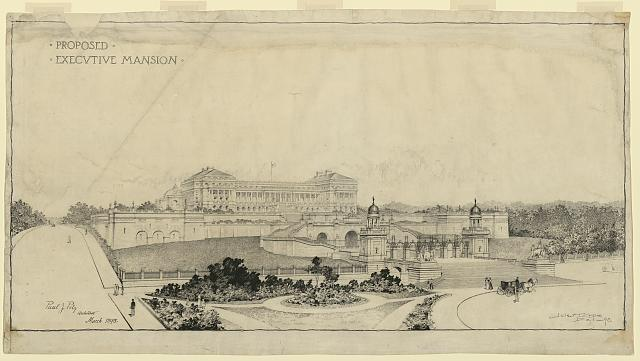
Design for an Executive Mansion on Meridian Hill, Washington DC, 1898

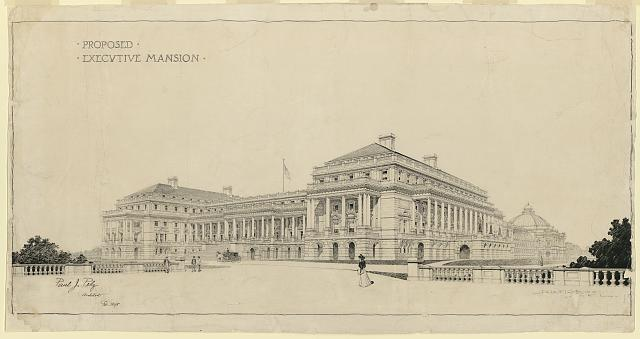
Executive Mansion project, view from the South-East

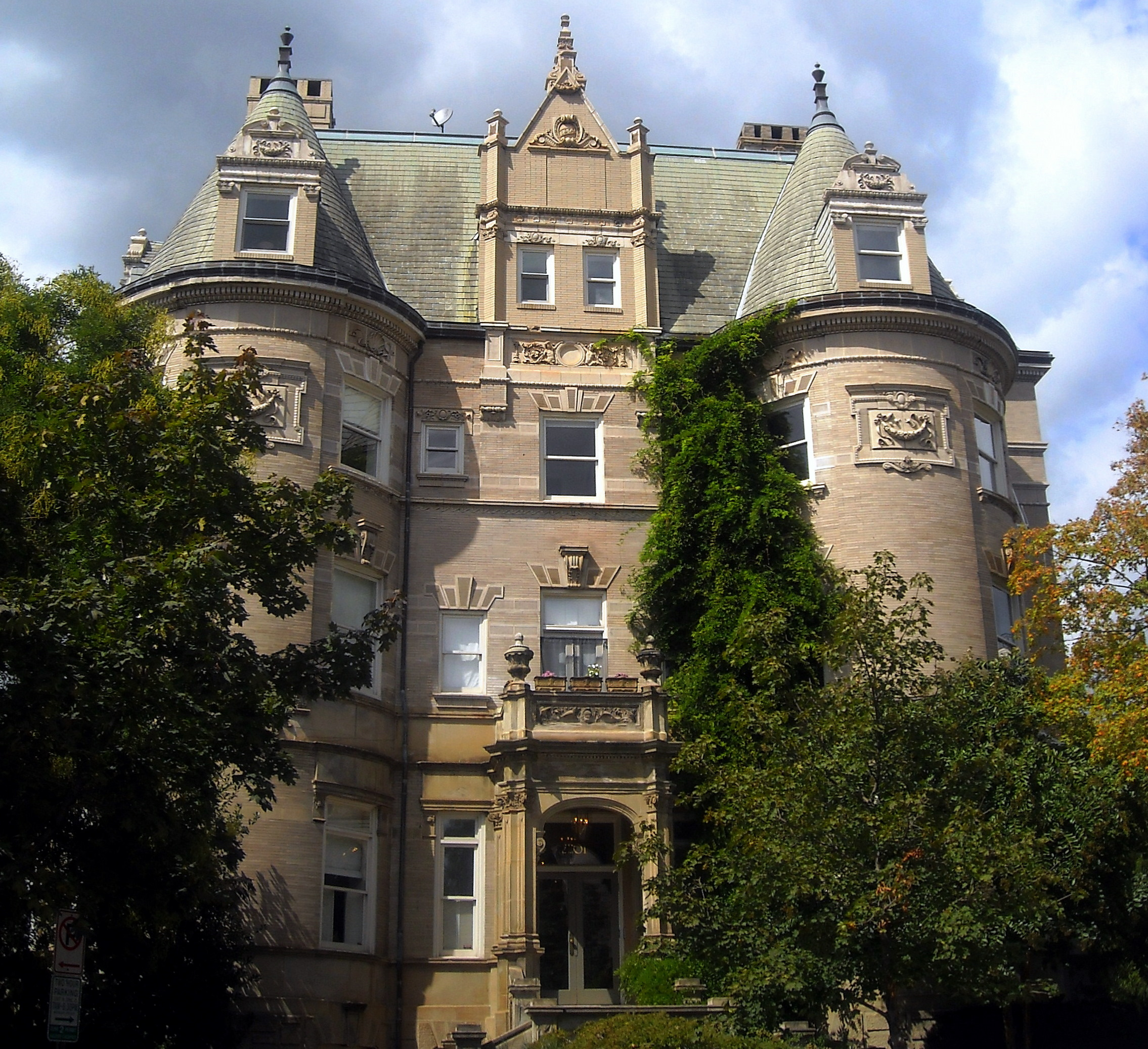
Miller House, Washington DC

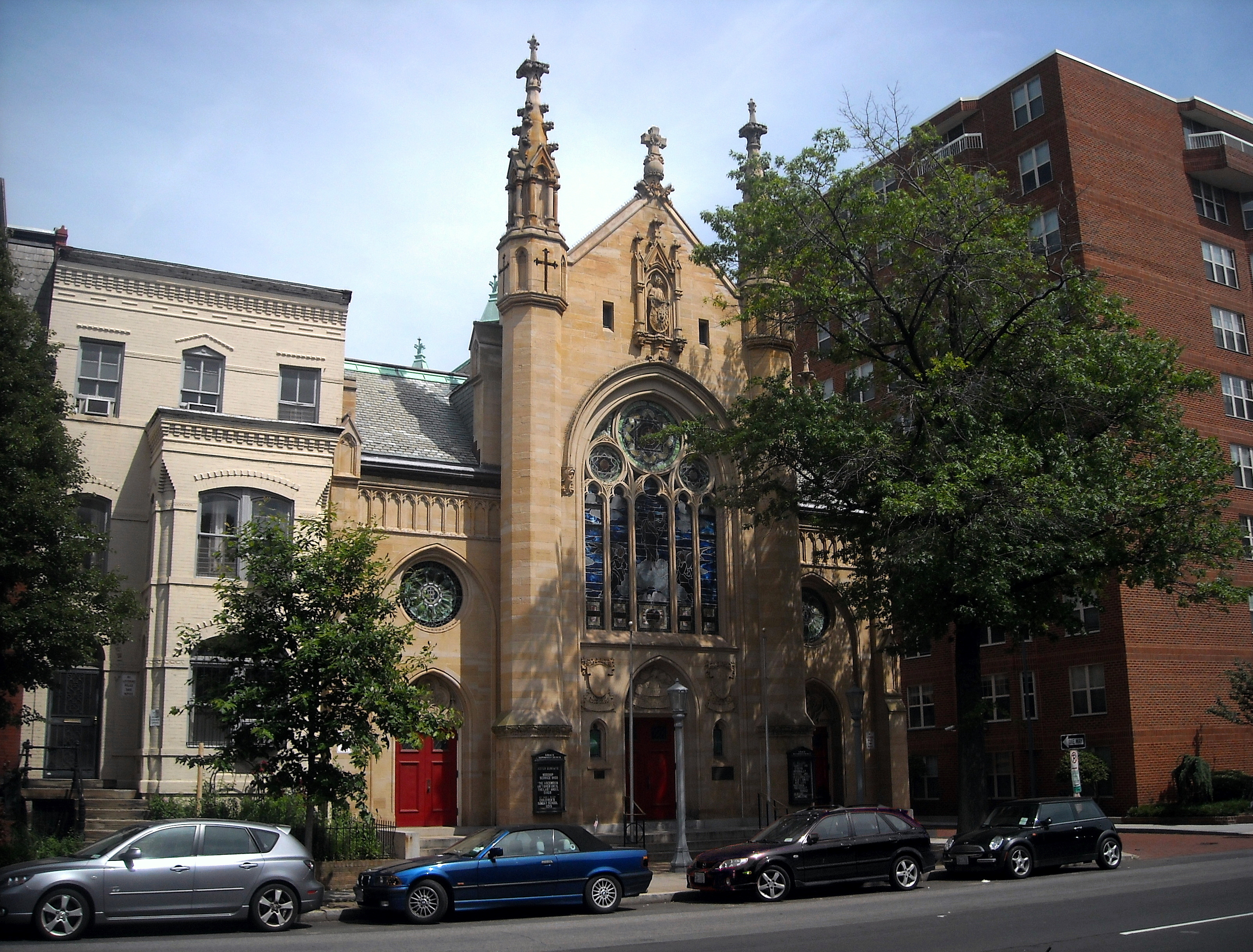
Grace Reformed Church, Washington DC

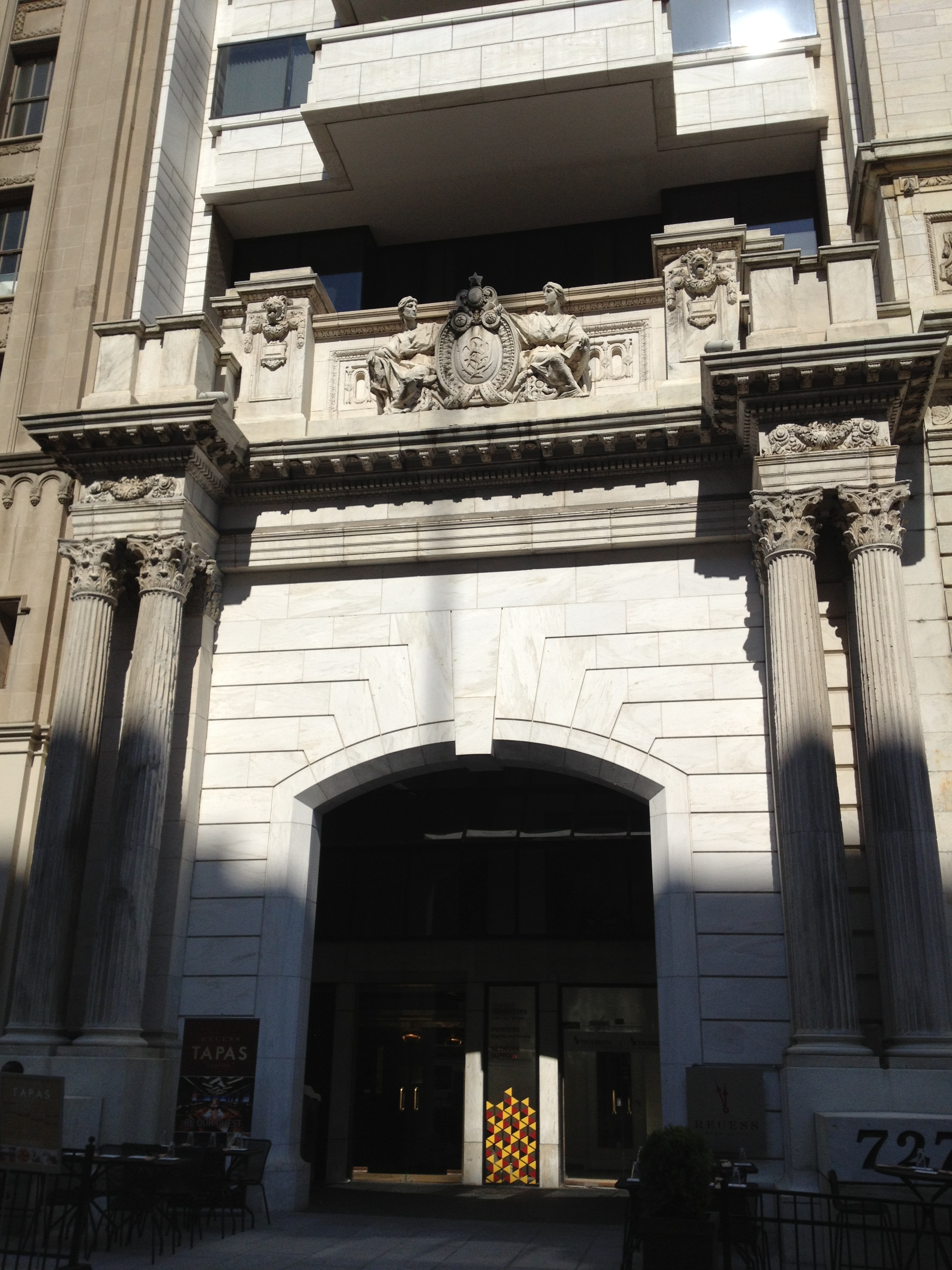
Swartzell, Rheem and Hensey Company Building, Washington DC

== See also ==
- Adolf Cluss
