= Colonel James Anderson Monument =

Public monument in Pittsburgh, Pennsylvania, US

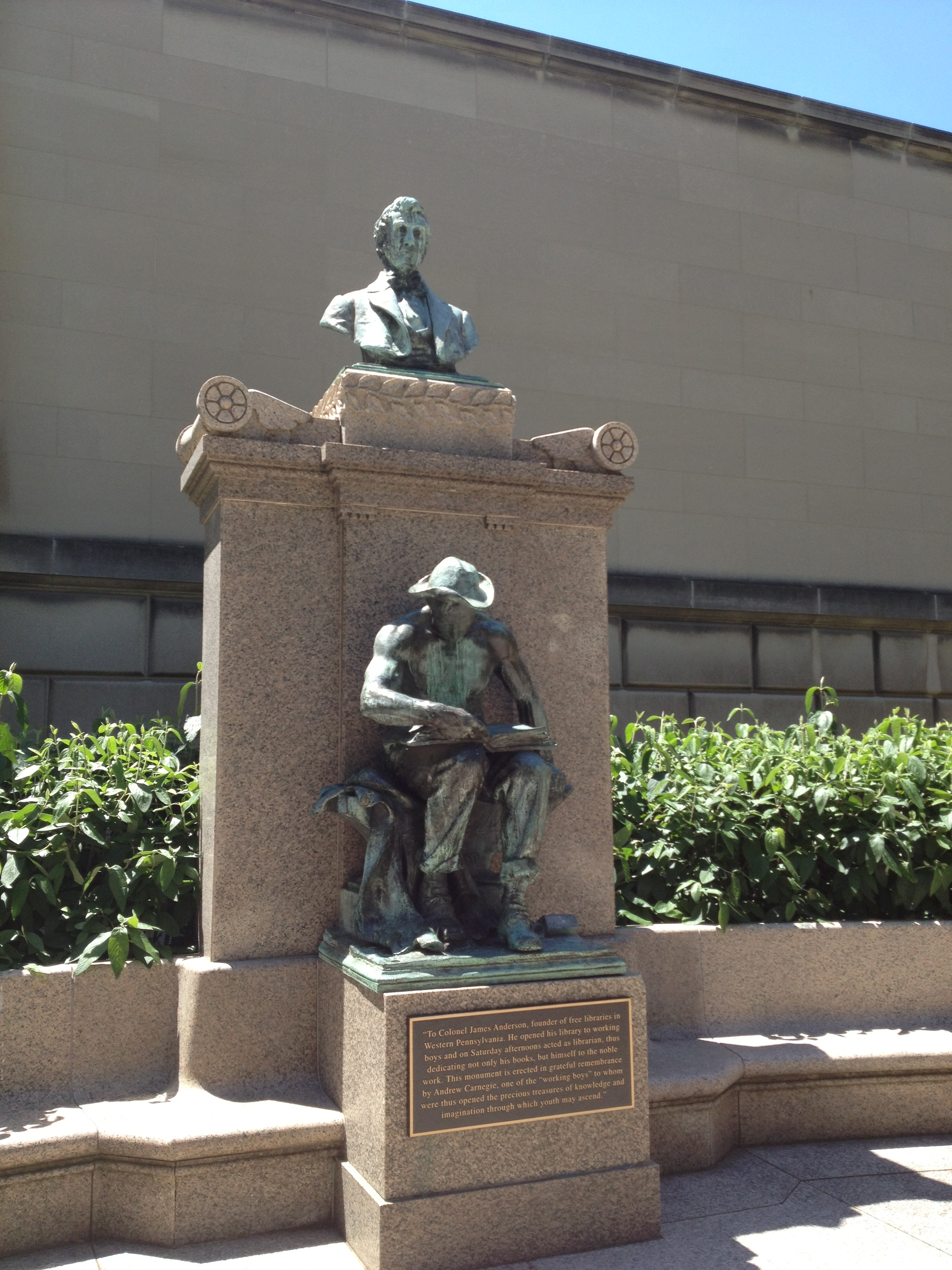
- The monument in 2013
- Location: Carnegie Free Library of Allegheny, Pittsburgh, Pennsylvania, United States
- Coordinates: 40.452865°N 80.005963°W
- Designer: Daniel Chester French (sculptor); Henry Bacon (architect)
- Fabricator: Robert Caterson (contractor)
- Dedicated date: June 15, 1904
- Dedicated to: Colonel James Anderson

The Colonel James Anderson Monument is a public monument in Pittsburgh, Pennsylvania, United States. It was designed by Daniel Chester French and commissioned by businessman and philanthropist Andrew Carnegie. Anderson had opened his personal book collection to the youth of Allegheny, Pennsylvania, including Carnegie, and his actions would later inspire Carnegie to create the Carnegie library system. The monument, dedicated in 1904, is located outside the Carnegie Free Library of Allegheny.

== History ==
James Anderson, the son of William Anderson, was born in Shippensburg, Pennsylvania in 1785. During the War of 1812, he served under William Henry Harrison and attained the rank of colonel. Following the war, he became a businessman in the Pittsburgh area and, later in life, a philanthropist. He later died in 1861. During the 1850s and 1860s, in one act of philanthropy, he opened his personal library of 400 volumes to the "working boys" of Allegheny, Pennsylvania. Andrew Carnegie and several of his friends were among those "working boys" in the city who regularly checked out books from Anderson's library. Carnegie was greatly affected by the library, later stating in his autobiography that "in this way the windows were opened in the walls of my dungeon through which the light of knowledge streamed in". It is believed that Anderson's free library would later inspire Carnegie to set up the Carnegie library system. Carnegie later claimed that "when fortune smiled upon me, one of my first duties was the erection of a monument to my benefactor".

On January 6, 1898, Carnegie sent a letter to his associate William Nimick Frew expressing his wish to erect a monument in Anderson's honor in front of the Carnegie Free Library of Allegheny, which was the first publicly funded Carnegie library. On February 8, Frew notified Allegheny mayor Charles Geyer of Carnegie's wishes. Carnegie also asked Frew to discuss the plan with Howard Russell Butler, and while Carnegie initially recommended seeking out Augustus Saint-Gaudens to design the monument, ultimately Daniel Chester French was chosen as the sculptor for the monument. However, French was preoccupied at the time and did not start on the monument until 1902. That same year, before the monument's completion, the Allegheny city council organized a committee to handle the location for the monument, as well as its unveiling ceremony. Henry Bacon served as the architect for the monument, and Robert Caterson of New York City served as the general contractor.

The monument was dedicated on June 15, 1904. As part of the ceremonies, multiple civic organizations participated in a parade, and a marching band performed before an audience of approximately 10,000 spectators. According to a history book, it was the "second major work of public art" commissioned in the Pittsburgh and the first to be unveiled in a large ceremony. Frew presented the monument, which was unveiled by L. Andele Anderson and received on behalf of the city by Mayor James G. Wyman. Music and singing was provided by both the American Military Band and the United German Singing Societies, while addresses were given by Samuel Harden Church, Stephen G. Porter, J. Leonard Levy, George D. Riddle, L. L. Gilbert, The Reverend Francis P. Ward, and Richard B. Scandrett. Additionally, a poem was read by George Barbour and a benediction was given by The Reverend J. A. Jayne to close the ceremony.

The monument was originally located in Diamond Square, at the corner of East Ohio Street and Federal Street. However, in the 1960s, the monument was dismantled by the Urban Redevelopment Authority of Pittsburgh during their creation of Allegheny Center. In 1984, the Pittsburgh History and Landmarks Foundation initiated a campaign to restore the monument. As a result, while the sculptures are original, the remainder of the monument, including the stone pedestals and bench, is a replica. Today, the monument is located in Allegheny Center, across from the library building.

== Design ==
The monument consists of an exedra and features two bronze sculptures. Atop a column is one sculpture, a bust of Anderson, which is situated behind the other sculpture, a 62-inch (1.6 m)-tall statue of a worker. The shirtless worker is seated on an anvil and reading a book. The statue of the reader is variously known as either Labor or Labor Reading. In front of the monument is a bronze plaque measuring 33 inches (84 cm) by 13 inches (33 cm). It bears the following inscription:

TO COLONEL JAMES ANDERSON – FOUNDER OF FREE LIBRARIES IN WESTERN PENNSYLVANIA / HE OPENED HIS LIBRARY TO "WORKING BOYS" AND UPON SATURDAY AFTERNOONS ACTED AS LIBRARIAN THUS DEDICATING NOT ONLY HIS BOOKS BUT HIMSELF TO THE NOBLE WORK- THIS MONUMENT IS ERECTED IN GRATEFUL REMEMBRANCE BY ANDREW CARNEGIE ONE OF THE WORKING BOYS TO WHOM WERE THUS OPENED THE PRECIOUS TREASURES OF KNOWLEDGE AND IMAGINATION THROUGH WHICH YOUTH MAY ASCEND

=== Analysis ===
Historian Edward Slavishak notes that the sculpture of Labor depicts Carnegie's ideas of an individual rising up from working-class conditions through education and the relationship between capitalist and worker where the capitalist serves as a patron, in this case by providing knowledge to the worker. According to Slavishak, "[t]he displayed worker turned his site of work, the anvil, into a stage for self-education, not manly toil. In Carnegie's vision and French's execution, the worker made a conscious decision to abandon work, yet never strayed far from the workplace". He also argues that Labor depicts Carnegie's "ideal labor force", where strength, while evident, was secondary to mental pursuits.

== See also ==
- 1904 in art
- Public sculptures by Daniel Chester French

== Bibliography ==
- "Colonel James Anderson Monument". Allegheny City Society. Archived from the original on January 22, 2021.
- Carnegie, Andrew (1915). A Carnegie Anthology. Arranged by Margaret Barclay Wilson. New York City: Privately printed – via Google Books.
- Carnegie, Andrew (1920). Autobiography of Andrew Carnegie with illustrations. Boston and New York City: The Riverside Press Cambridge. ISBN 978-0-7222-2191-4 – via Google Books.
- "A Guide To Walking Tours of North Shore". KDKA-TV. November 4, 2010. Archived from the original on March 5, 2016.
- Allegheny (Pittsburgh, Pa. ). (1903). Municipal Reports of the City of Allegheny, for the Fiscal Year ending February 28th, 1903 – via Google Books.
- Official Souvenir Program of the Exercises Attending the Unveiling of the Monument Erected to the Memory of Col. James Anderson by Andrew Carnegie. Allegheny, Pennsylvania: Duquesne Printing Company. 1904. hdl:2027/hvd.hx2wuw – via HathiTrust.
- "COLONEL JAMES ANDERSON MONUMENT". Pittsburgh Art Places. Archived from the original on February 26, 2021.
- Slavishak, Edward (2008). Bodies of Work: Civic Display and Labor in Industrial Pittsburgh. Durham, North Carolina and London: Duke University Press. ISBN 978-0-8223-8934-7 – via Google Books.
