= Carnegie Free Library of Allegheny =

- U.S. National Register of Historic Places
- City of Pittsburgh Historic Structure
- Pittsburgh Landmark – PHLF
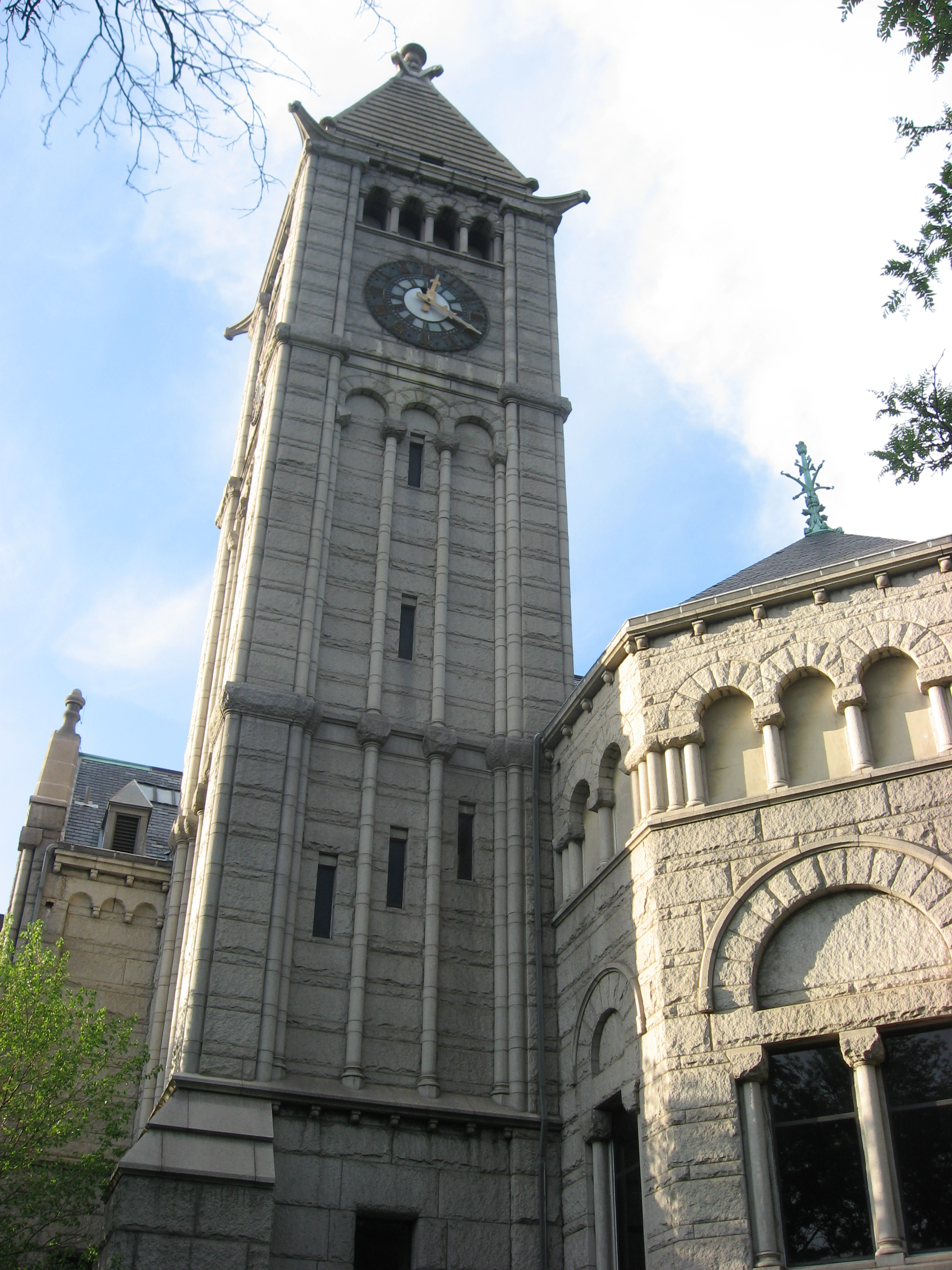

- Location within Pittsburgh Location within Pennsylvania Location within the United States
- Location: Allegheny Center, Pittsburgh, Pennsylvania
- Coordinates: 40°27′11″N 80°0′19″W
- Area: 1 acre (0.40 ha)
- Built: 1886–90
- Architect: Smithmeyer & Pelz
- Architectural style: Romanesque Revival, Richardsonian Romanesque
- NRHP reference No.: 74001736

Significant dates
- Added to NRHP: November 1, 1974
- Designated CPHS: March 15, 1974
- Designated PHLF: 1970

The Carnegie Free Library of Allegheny is situated in the Allegheny Center neighborhood of Pittsburgh, Pennsylvania. It was commissioned in 1886, the first Carnegie library to be commissioned in the United States. Donated to the public by entrepreneur Andrew Carnegie, it was built from 1886 to 1890 on a design by John L. Smithmeyer and Paul J. Pelz.

The library and musical conservatory was built of red and grey granite from Maine. The contractor was Vinalhaven, Maine's Bodwell Granite Company, which had furnished granite for major public works including the State, War and Navy Department building in Washington, DC., now called the Eisenhower Executive Office Building.

It did not open until 1890 thus making it the second Carnegie library to open, after the Carnegie Free Library of Braddock, built for steel-workers in Braddock, 9 miles up the Monongahela River from Pittsburgh, opened in 1889.

The building also features the first Carnegie Music Hall in the United States. The Music Hall at the Braddock Library would not open until an 1893 expansion of that structure.

The running costs were met from local taxes – unlike the Carnegie Library in Braddock, which received an endowment from Carnegie. After a 2006 lightning strike, the library reopened in a new building a few blocks north on Federal Street in 2009. Following the move, the New Hazlett Theater was the primary tenant. In April 2019, the Children's Museum of Pittsburgh opened Museum Lab, a makerspace for youth aged 10+.

It was listed on the National Register of Historic Places in 1974.

== Gallery ==
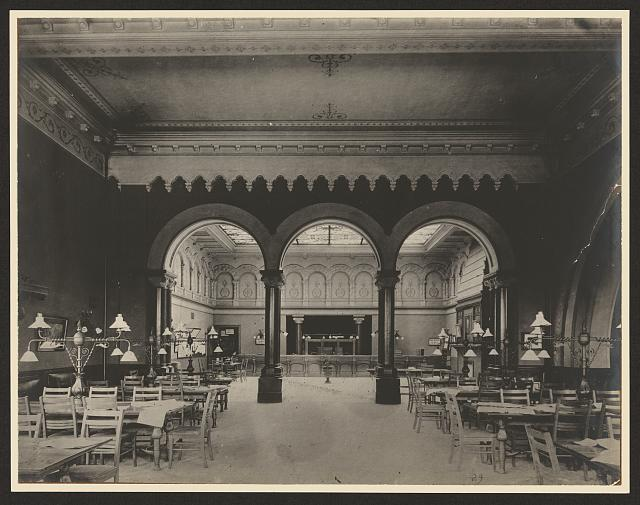
Reading Room, ca. 1900

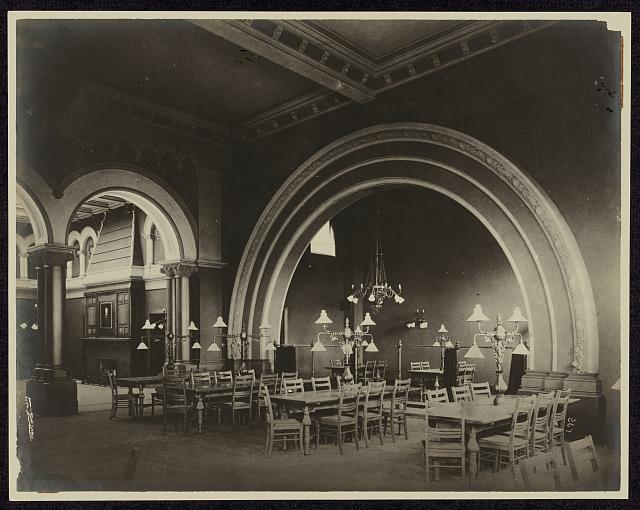
Women's Reading Room, ca. 1900

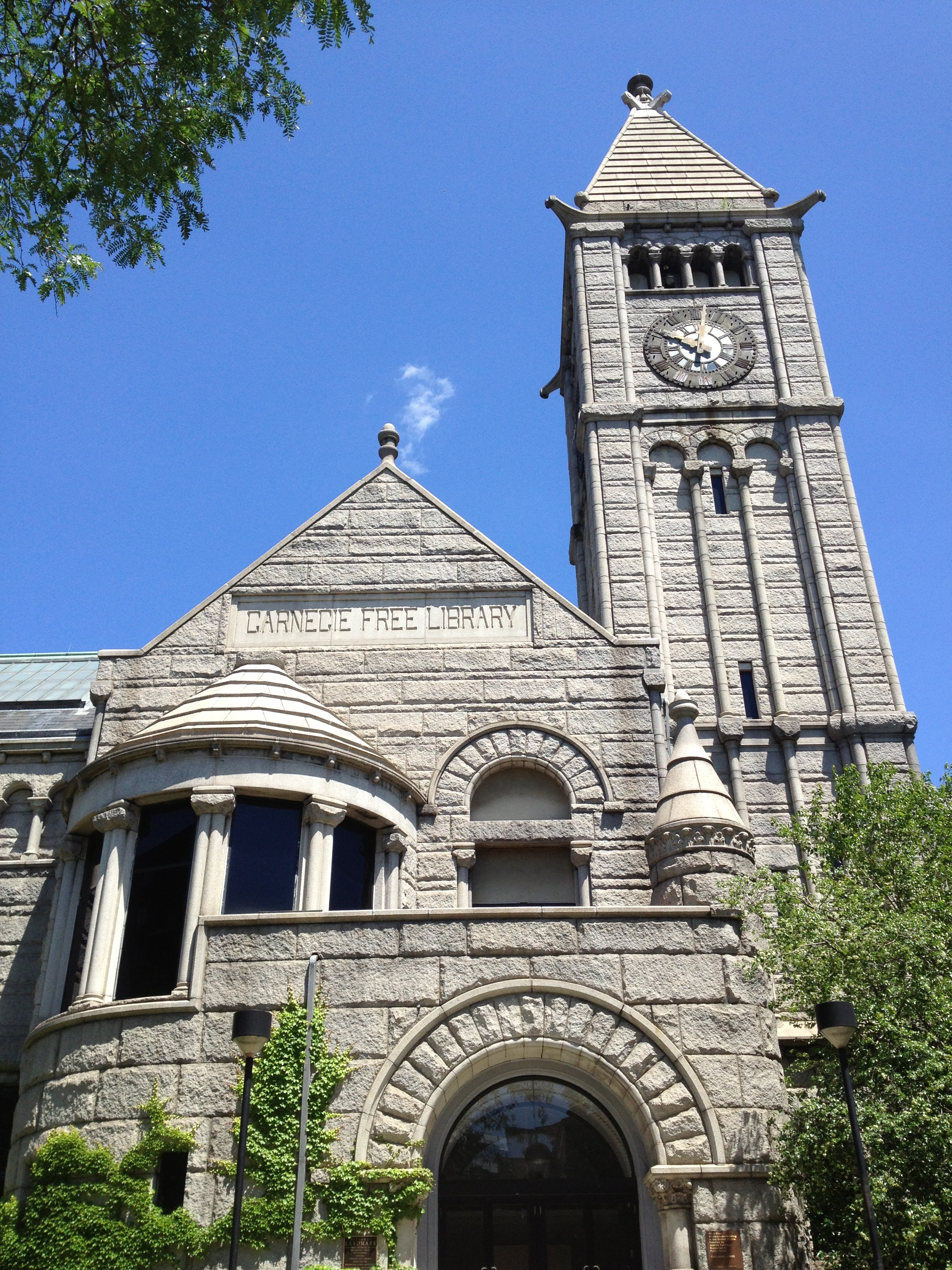
Library entrance

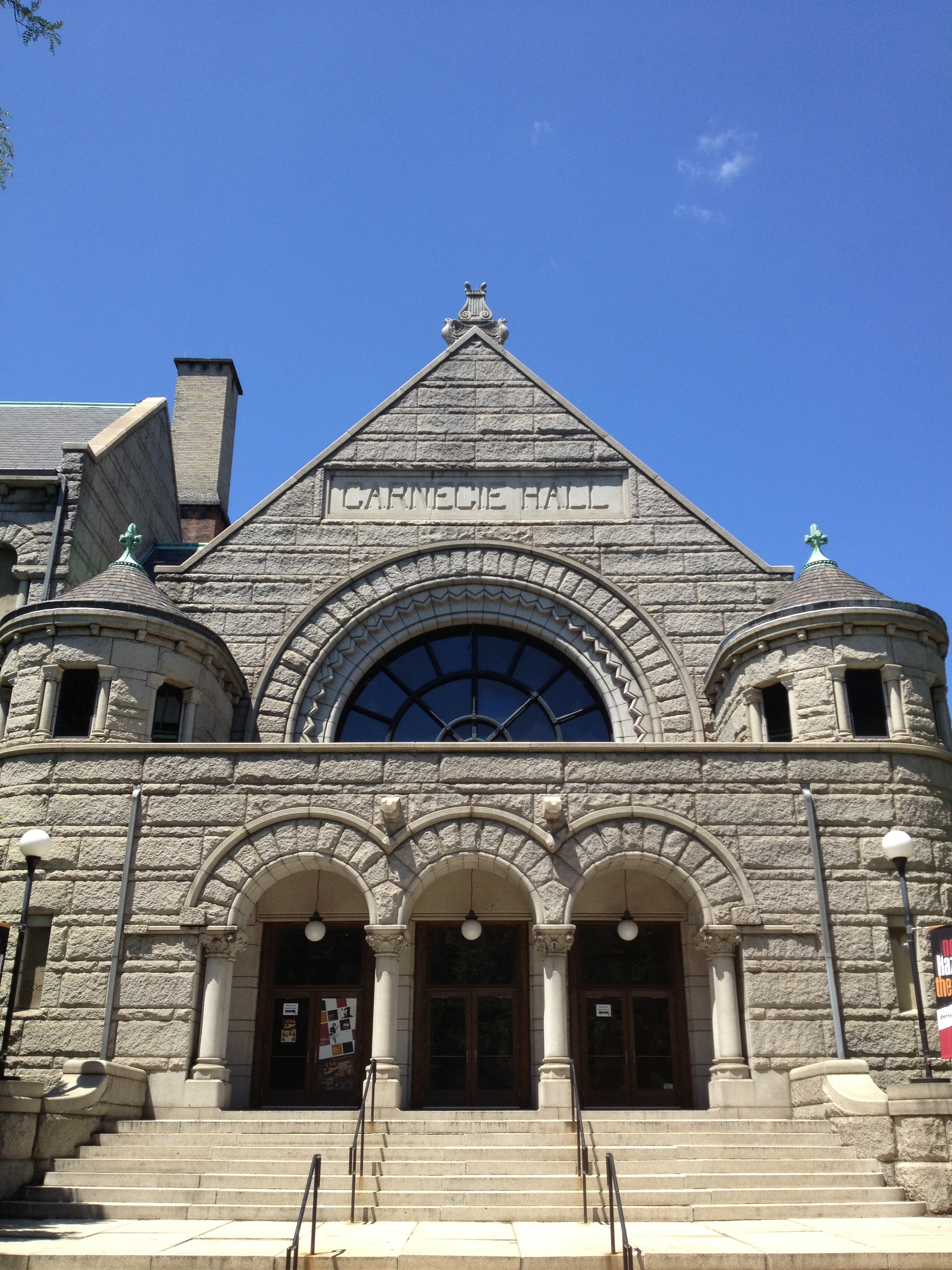
Carnegie Hall entrance (now New Hazlett Theater)

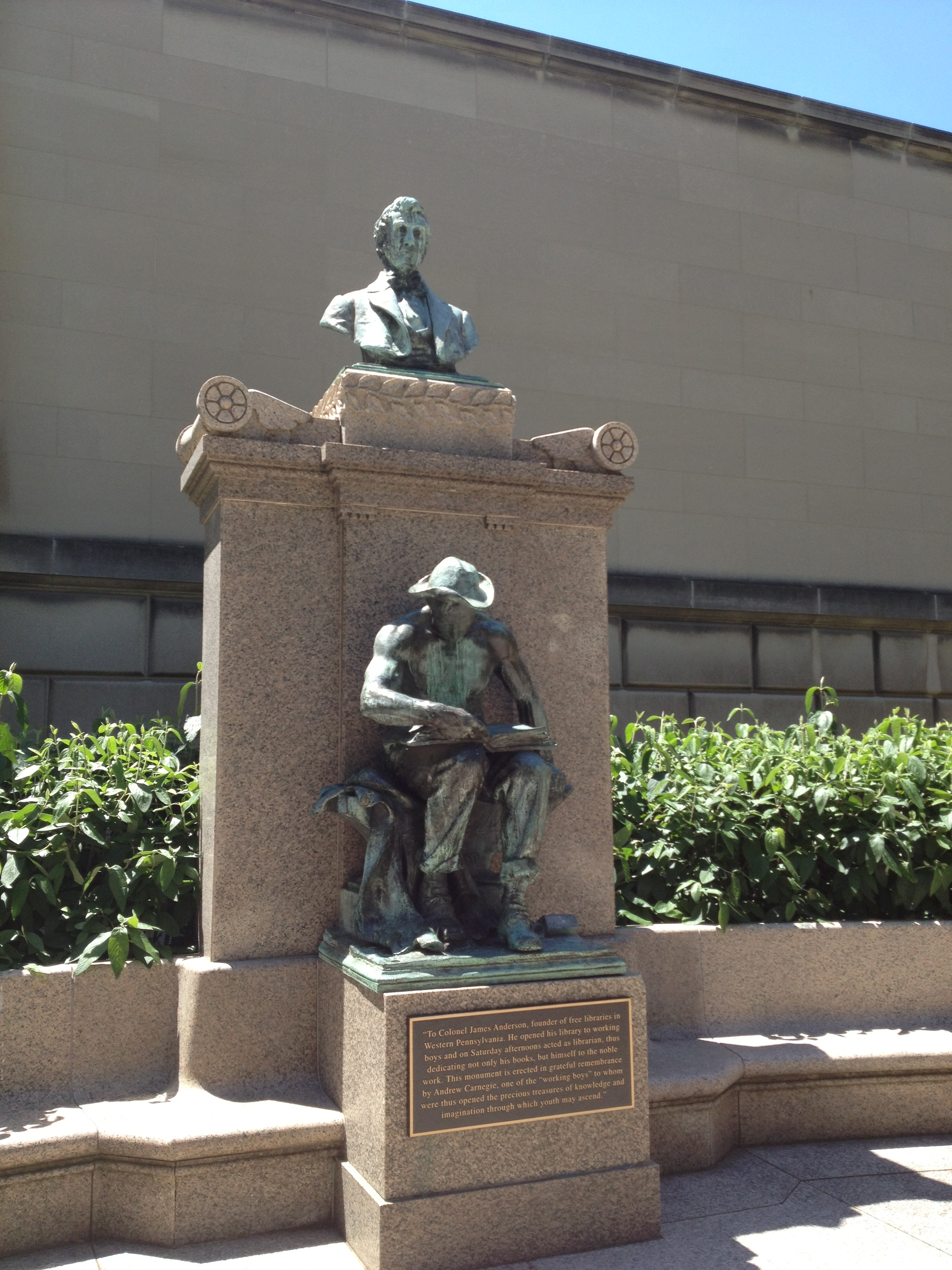
Monument to Colonel James Anderson, who inspired Carnegie to donate free libraries
