= Lists of waterways =

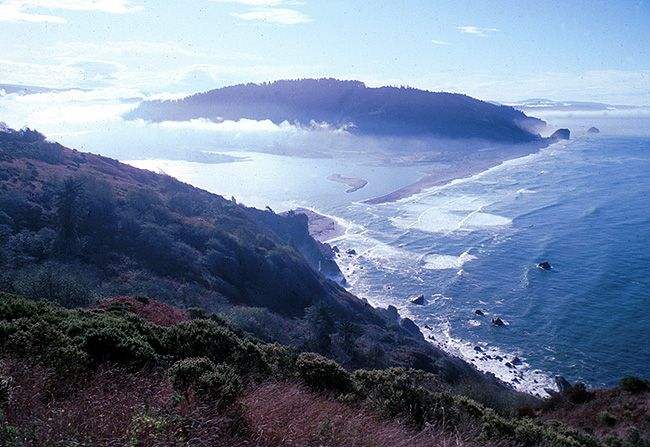
Estuary of Klamath River in Redwood National and State Parks, California

This article is a collection of lists of natural (rivers, estuaries, and straits) and artificial (reservoirs, canals and locks) waterways.

== Waterways lists ==
=== Natural waterways ===
See also: List of straits

- List of estuaries in England
- List of straits in the United States
- List of watercourses in Western Australia
- List of watercourses in the San Francisco Bay Area

=== Artificial waterways ===
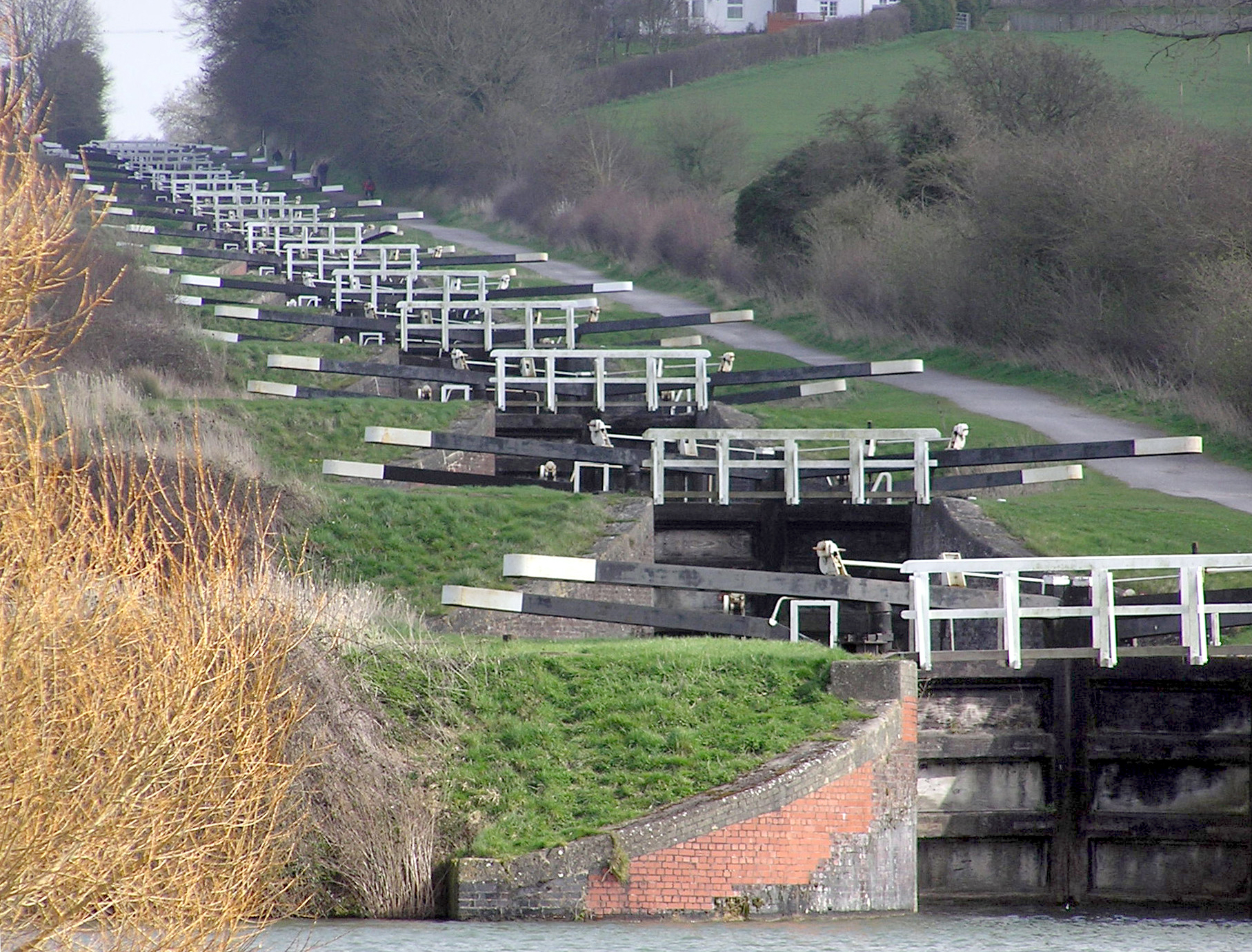
The flight of 16 consecutive locks at Caen Hill on the Kennet and Avon Canal, Wiltshire, England

==== Canals ====
- List of canals in Australia
- List of canals in Belgium
- List of canals in France
- List of canals in Canada
- List of canals in Germany
- List of canals in Ireland
- List of canals in Pakistan
- List of canals in Switzerland
- List of canals of the United Kingdom
- List of canals in the United States
  - List of canals in Massachusetts
  - List of canals in New York
  - List of canals in Oregon
  - List of canals in Texas
- List of Martian canals
- List of aqueducts
- List of interoceanic canals
- List of transcontinental canals

=== Others ===
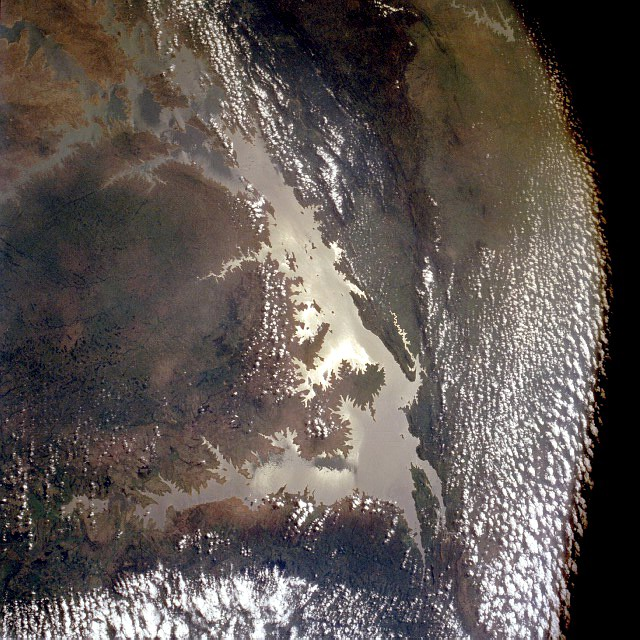
The world's largest reservoir – Lake Volta, Ghana

- Lists of reservoirs and dams
- List of locks and dams of the Ohio River
- List of locks and dams of the Upper Mississippi River
- List of canal locks in the United Kingdom

== Organizations about waterways ==
- List of navigation authorities in the United Kingdom
- List of navigation authorities in the United States
- List of waterway societies in the United Kingdom

== See also ==
- Sheep Creek
