= List of canals by country =

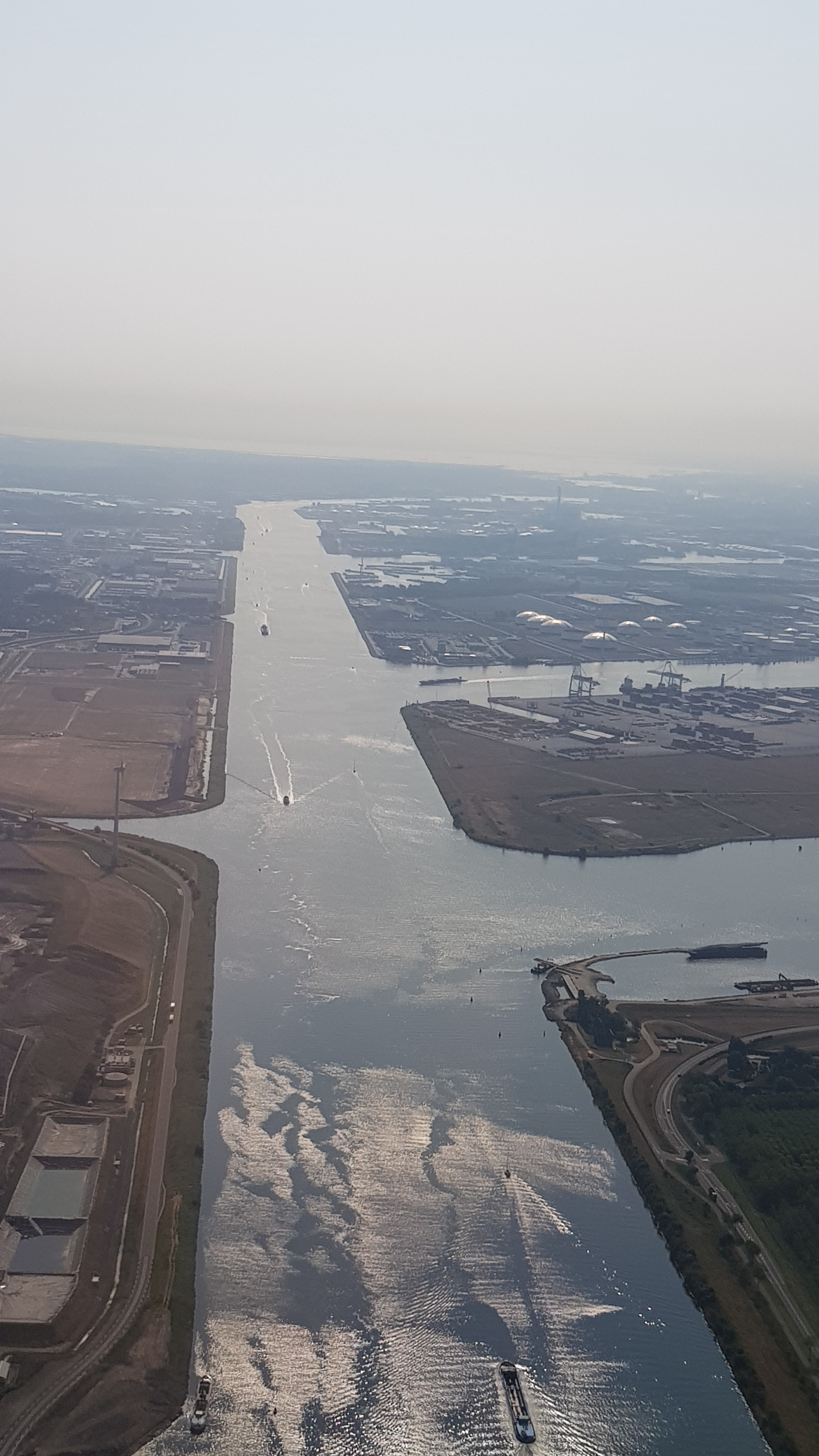
The Noordzeekanaal in the Netherlands

Canals are human-made structures, built for water control, flood prevention, irrigation, and water transport. Their exact design varies depending upon the local importance of each function. The term 'canal' is often used to describe both human-made canals and river navigations, whether free-flowing waterways, or those with locks and dams or weirs.

== List of lists ==
- List of canals in Belgium
- List of canals in Canada
- History of canals in China
- List of canals in France
- List of canals in Germany
- List of canals in India
- Canals in Italy (category)
  - List of Roman canals
- List of canals in Ireland
- Canals in the Netherlands (category)
  - Canals of Amsterdam
- Canals in Norway (category)
- Canals in Pakistan (category)
- List of canals in Russia
- Canals in Sweden (category)
- List of canals in Switzerland
- List of canals of the United Kingdom
  - List of canal tunnels in the United Kingdom
- List of canals in the United States
  - List of canals in Massachusetts
  - List of canals in New York
  - List of canals in Oregon
  - List of canals in Texas

== Categories of Canals ==
- Category:Canals by country
  - Category:Lists of canals by country

== List of canals ==
- Chile
  - Bío-Bío Canal
- Egypt
  - Suez Canal
- Finland
  - Saimaa Canal
- Greece
  - Corinthian Canal connected the Gulf of Corinth with the Aegean Sea,
- Pakistan
  - Kachhi Canal
- Panama
  - Panama Canal
- Poland
  - Augustów Canal
  - Bydgoszcz Canal
  - Elbląg Canal
  - Danube–Oder Canal
- Romania
  - Danube–Black Sea Canal
  - Danube–Bucharest Canal
- Serbia
  - Great Bačka Canal
  - Little Bačka Canal
  - Danube–Tisa–Danube Canal
- Spain
  - Canal de Castilla
  - Canal del Duero
  - Canal de Isabel II
  - Canal Imperial de Aragón
- Taiwan
  - Liugongjun
  - Lyu-Chuan Canal
  - Tainan Canal
- Turkmenistan
  - Qaraqum Canal
- United Arab Emirates
  - Dubai Water Canal
- Vietnam
  - Vĩnh Tế Canal

== See also ==
- List of Martian canals
- Lists of canals
