= List of waterways =

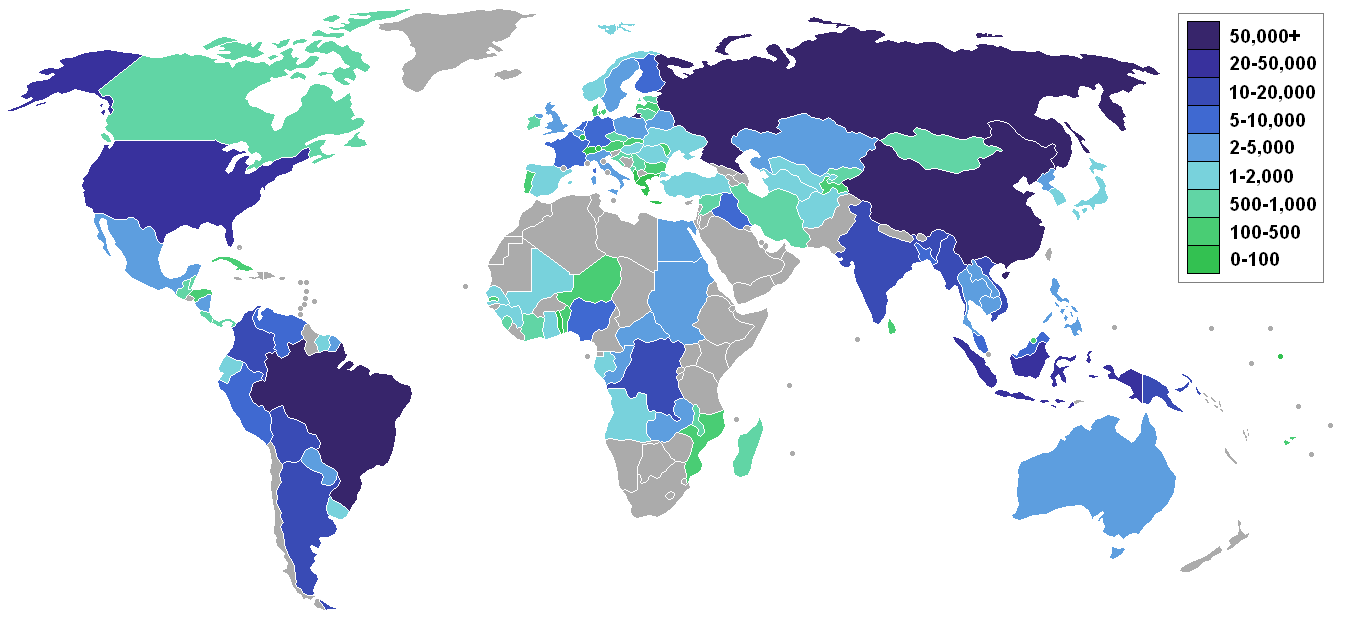
Total length of waterways per country in kilometers

This is a list of waterways, defined as navigable rivers, canals, estuaries, lakes, or firths. In practice, and depending on the language, the term "waterway" covers maritime or inland transport routes, as suggested by "way". Wherever a free-flowing river cannot bear load-carrying vessels, the correct term is "watercourse", with no connotation of use for transportation of cargo. To be of practical use, the list distinguishes international maritime waterways (including ship canals), international inland waterways, then inland waterways, including canals and large lakes.

== Lists ==
=== International waterways ===
- List of interoceanic canals
- List of transcontinental canals

==== International maritime waterways ====
- Danish Straits
  - Great Belt
  - Øresund
- Turkish Straits
  - Bosphorus
  - Sea of Marmara
  - Dardanelles
- Strait of Malacca

==== International inland waterways ====
- St. Croix River (Canada, United States)
- Danube (Germany, Austria, Slovakia, Hungary, Croatia, Serbia, Bulgaria, Moldova, Ukraine, Romania)
- Rhine (Switzerland, Liechtenstein, Austria, Germany, France, Netherlands, Luxembourg)
- Mekong (China, Myanmar, Laos, Thailand, Vietnam)
- Nile River (Egypt, Sudan, South Sudan, Uganda)
- Lake Victoria (Uganda, Tanzania, Kenya)
- Congo River and its tributaries (Republic of the Congo, Democratic Republic of the Congo, Central African Republic)
- Colorado River (United States, Mexico)
- Great Lakes Waterway (United States, Canada)
- Waterway E70 (Belgium, Netherlands, Germany, Poland, Russia, Lithuania)
- Waterway E40

=== Waterways by country ===
==== Argentina ====
- Rio de La Plata
- Paraná River

==== Australia ====
- Bass Strait
- Murray River

==== Austria ====
- Danube River

==== Azerbaijan ====
- Caspian Sea – Note: the capital city of Azerbaijan, Baku is a port on this sea.

==== Belgium ====
- Meuse River
- Scheldt River

==== Bolivia ====
- Lake Titicaca

==== Brazil ====
- Amazon River
- Paraná River

==== Canada ====
- Saint John (Woolastook) River
- Northwest Passage
- Saint Lawrence Seaway
- Mackenzie River
- St. Marys River and canal of Ontario
- Detroit River
- St. Clair River
- Welland Canal
- Lake St. Clair
- Lake Superior
- Saskatchewan River
- Hudson Strait and Hudson Bay
- Great Bear Lake, including Port Radium

==== Chile ====
- Valdivia River
- Bueno River (before 1960 Valdivia earthquake)

==== China ====
- Amur River
- Yalu River
- Yangtze River
- Yellow River

==== Croatia ====
- Danube river
- Drava
- Sava River

==== Egypt ====
- Nile River
- Lake Nasser
- Suez Canal
- Gulf of Suez
- Gulf of Aqaba

==== France ====
- Rhine River
- Rhone River
- Seine River
- Meuse River
- List of canals in France

==== Germany ====
- Rhine River
- Main River
- Rhine-Main-Danube Canal
- Danube River
- Elbe River
- Kiel Canal

==== India–Bangladesh ====
- Brahmaputra River – Sadiya to Dhubri stretch (891 km)
- Ganges River – Prayagraj to Haldia stretch (1,620 km)

==== Iran ====
- Caspian Sea
- Persian Gulf
- Karun

==== Netherlands ====
- IJsselmeer
- Meuse (Maas)
- Rhine River
- Scheldt River
- Waal River

==== New Zealand ====
- Cook Strait
- Foveaux Strait
- Hauraki Gulf
- Lake Wakatipu
- Whanganui River

==== Pakistan ====
- Chenab River
- Indus River

==== Paraguay ====
- Paraná River
- Paraguay River

==== Peru ====
- Amazon River
- Lake Titicaca

==== Philippines ====
- San Bernardino Strait
- Surigao Strait
- Manila Bay

==== Portugal ====
- Douro River

==== Romania ====
- Danube River
- Danube–Black Sea Canal
- Bega (Tisza)

==== Russia ====
- Volga–Baltic Waterway
- White Sea – Baltic Canal
- Amur River
- Caspian Sea
- Lake Baikal
- Dnieper River
- Don River
- Lena River
- Neva River
- Ob River

==== Serbia ====
- Danube River
- Sava River

==== Slovakia ====
- Danube River

==== Switzerland ====
- Lake Constance
- Lake Geneva
- Rhine River

==== Turkey ====
- Bosporus
- Dardanelles
- Sea of Marmara
- Black Sea

==== United Kingdom ====
- River Severn
- River Thames
- Humber River
- Waterways in the United Kingdom

==== United States ====
- Mississippi River System
- Missouri River
- Monongahela River
- Ohio River
- St. Lawrence Seaway
- Atlantic Intracoastal Waterway
- Chesapeake Bay
- Columbia River
- Delaware River
- Detroit River
- Erie Canal
- Gulf Intracoastal Waterway
- Hudson River
- Lake Champlain
- Lake Michigan
- Lake Superior
- Sacramento River
- Savannah River
- St. Clair River
- St. Marys River and canal of Michigan
- Tennessee River
- Tennessee-Tombigbee Waterway
- List of canals in the United States

==== Ukraine ====
- Dnieper River

==== Uruguay ====
- Rio de la Plata
- Uruguay River

==== Vietnam ====
- Mekong River

== See also ==
- List of canals by country
