= Skull Islet =

Coordinates: 48°45′7.2″N 123°14′16.72″W

Skull Islet is a small islet just off the shore of South Pender Island in British Columbia. It is on the east side of Bedwell Harbour. Skull Islet is part of Gulf Islands National Park Reserve and is Authorized Access Only.
