= Great Migration of Canada =

1815–1850 period of high immigration from Europe

The Great Migration of Canada (also known as the Great Migration from Britain or the first wave of immigration to Canada) was a period of high immigration to Canada from 1815 to 1850, which involved over 800,000 immigrants, mainly of British and Irish origin. Though Europe was becoming richer through the Industrial Revolution, population growth made the relative number of jobs low, forcing many to look to the New World for economic success, especially Canada and the United States.

== Background ==
In the late-18th and early-19th century, there occurred a transition in parts of Great Britain's previously manual-labor-based economy towards machine-based manufacturing. It started with the mechanization of the textile industries, the development of iron-making techniques, and the increased use of refined coal.

It was at the same time met with a rapid population explosion. A slow rise in quality of living standards throughout the past 200 years allowed more children to survive and made childbearing more economic. Jobs that were previously done by poor peasants could now be done even cheaper by machinery, and this led to the loss of many jobs. The combined effects made it difficult for some to find jobs, leading them to look to the colonies in the Americas for work.

== The Migration ==
As the Industrial Revolution began in Britain, the first immigrants, who were the majority, of the Great Migration were British (English and Scottish) and made up 60% of Canada's immigrant population and so were the largest group in Canada. The Great Migration encouraged immigrants to settle in Canada after the War of 1812, including British army regulars who had served in that war.

Worried about another American attempt at invasion and to counter the French-speaking influence of Quebec, colonial governors of Canada rushed to promote settlement in backcountry areas along newly-constructed plank roads within organized land tracts, mostly in Upper Canada (now Ontario).

Irish immigrants to Canada first came as workers, or navvies, in the 1820 to the 1840s, mostly to Ontario, Quebec, and New Brunswick. They increased in small numbers to organize land settlements and mostly to work on canals, timber, railroads. Between 1846 and 1849, much of Irish immigration would come as result of people escaping the Great Famine of Ireland. As such, hundreds of thousands more Irish migrants arrived on Canada's shores, with a portion migrating to the United States in the short term or over the subsequent decades.

Other people from other countries migrated as well. Americans went to British Columbia to look for gold, a material that was quickly evaporating because of the California gold rush. Also, Chinese went to British Columbia to help build the Canadian Pacific Railway and to escape war and famine in their own country. Those migrations can be considered apart from those in earlier times.

== Impact ==
The Great Migration had profound impacts on Canadian culture and identity. Before 1815, 80% of English-speaking Canadians were exiles or immigrants from the 13 American colonies or their descendants. Because of this, until the 1830s, English Canada had pronounced American cultural 'flavour' in spite of the political divide over membership in the British Empire and independence. This may account even today for many cultural similarities.

At the beginning of the Great Migration, when the total population of Canada was approximately half a million, Canadians of French descent (known as Canadiens) outnumbered those of British descent. By the end of the period, however, the English-Canadian population was double that of the French-Canadian population out of a total of 2.4 million. The British Canadians also expanded into Lower Canada, which caused contentions with the French-Canadian subjects. Crowded conditions on immigrant ships led to periodic outbreaks in diseases such as cholera in Lower Canada which spread to local urban populations and resulted in increased use of quarantine facilities such as Grosse Isle, Quebec and Partridge Island, New Brunswick. The impact also had more British influence on British North America, further assimilating the French residents of Lower Canada.
