= Leprosy Act 1906 =

Parliament Act

The Leprosy Act was an act of the Parliament of Canada regarding the establishment and direction of lazarettos, or leper homes, in Canada to ensure the segregation and treatment of people afflicted with leprosy. The Leprosy Act gave responsibility to the Minister of Agriculture for the management of the lazarettos, apprehension and confinement of the ill, capture of escaped inmates, and punishment of those found to be harbouring or concealing a person afflicted with leprosy.

== Background ==
Canada’s first documented case of leprosy was in 1815 in New Brunswick, when Ursula and Joseph Benedict contracted the disease and later died after two Norwegian sailors covered in sores spent the winter in their home.

The first lazaretto in Canada was established in 1844 at Sheldrake Island, New Brunswick and operated until 1848 when the lazaretto at Tracadie, New Brunswick was opened. The Canadian government took over the responsibility for the lazaretto from New Brunswick at the time of Confederation. A lazaretto was established in British Columbia at D'Arcy Island in 1891 to house Chinese immigrants with the disease and its operation was taken over by the Canadian government with the passing of the Leprosy Act.

An important figure in the history of leprosy in Canada and in the passing of the Leprosy Act was Dr. Alfred Corbett Smith. First in his capacity as the Inspector of Leprosy for the government of Canada from 1889 until 1899, then as the Medical Superintendent for the Tracadie lazaretto, Dr. Smith was optimistic that there was a cure for leprosy and believed that compulsory segregation was essential in order to keep the wider population disease-free. Dr. Smith undertook "tours of inspection" across New Brunswick where he visited households, lobster canneries, and fish packing plants looking for cases of leprosy. He also travelled to Cape Breton, Nova Scotia, Victoria, British Columbia, and Winnipeg, Manitoba to investigate suspected cases of leprosy. Throughout his career Dr. Smith lobbied for more stringent legislation for the apprehension, detention, and medical supervision of leprous people in Canada, an objective that was realized in the 1906 Leprosy Act.

In 1902 it was reported that there were eleven men and seven women incarcerated at the Tracadie, New Brunswick lazaretto. Throughout the province of New Brunswick and Cape Breton, Nova Scotia, there were three or four cases of leprosy that were being treated in isolation and under the supervision of the Tracadie lazaretto. Along with the lazaretto at Tracadie, New Brunswick, there was a provincially supported lazaretto at D’Arcy Island, British Columbia for Chinese immigrants. There were also reports of instances of leprosy found among the Western provinces and Icelanders living in Manitoba.

== The Act ==
In 1906 the federal government passed the Leprosy Act and it was enacted on January 31, 1907. The federal government took over responsibility of the lazaretto on D’Arcy Island from the province of British Columbia and hired a guardian and interpreter and established weekly supplies of fresh meat, fish, fruit, and vegetables for the lazaretto. Soon after assuming care of the lazaretto the Canadian government deported all the inmates to a hospital in China. The act also established that the director general of public health was required to undertake yearly examinations of every lazaretto.

The Leprosy Act enabled the federal government, through the Minister of Agriculture, to establish a lazaretto where and when it was deemed necessary and to appoint a medical superintendent, officers, and servants for the proper management and care of the facility and its inmates. The Minister of Agriculture was also responsible for creating rules and regulations regarding diet, bedding, maintenance, employment, classification, instruction, and discipline of inmates.

The Leprosy Act stated that every person afflicted with leprosy was subject to confinement in a lazaretto. If the Minister of Agriculture suspected a person of having leprosy they were to be examined by a medical officer and admitted to a lazaretto. If the person afflicted refused they were to be apprehended and forcibly confined and every inmate was required to be incarcerated until it was certified that it was safe for them to be discharged and to be at large. Confinement could be avoided if the medical officer reported that the disease was not in the contagious stage and that proper isolation and treatment could be carried out. If an inmate of a lazaretto escaped, the Leprosy Act enabled any constable or peace officer to retake and return them.

If any person was found to be harbouring or concealing a person afflicted with leprosy with the intention of preventing them from being examined, the Leprosy Act established that they were guilty of a criminal offence and subject to a penalty of a fine between $10 and $100 or to an imprisonment period of one to six months, with or without hard labor, or both. The Leprosy Act also established that a justice of the peace could authorize any person to enter into a property where there was information given that a leper was concealed inside and apprehend the ill person and bring them before a justice of the peace to be committed for examination.

The lazaretto at Tracadie, New Brunswick had been in operation for one hundred and seventeen years when it closed in 1965. The lazaretto at D’Arcy Island, British Columbia was moved to Bentinck Island, British Columbia in 1924 and operated until 1957.
