= Mount Norman =

Highest peak on the Pender Islands, British Columbia

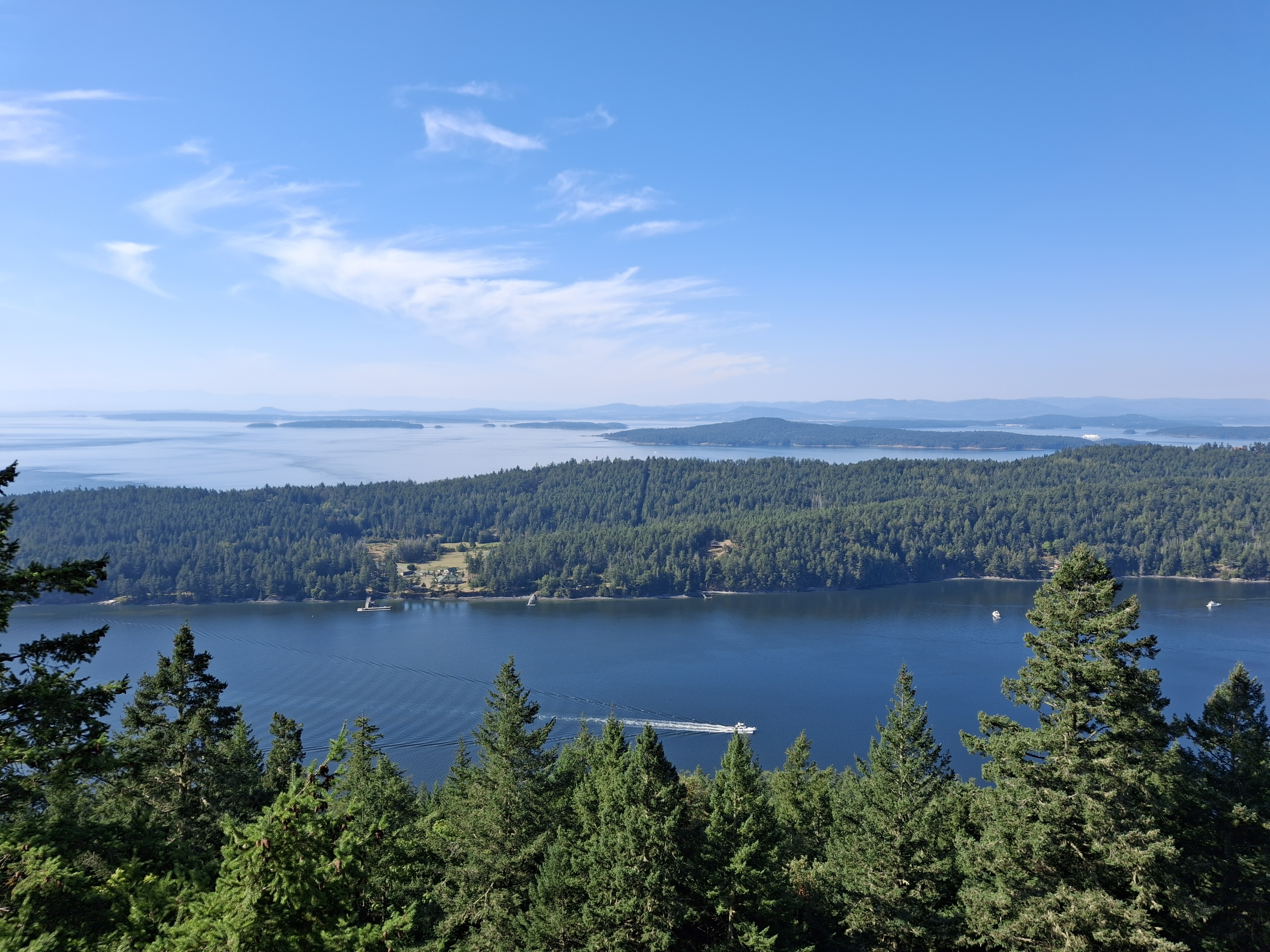
- View from the summit observation platform overlooking North Pender Island and Bedwell Harbour.

Highest point
- Elevation: 244 m (801 ft)
- Coordinates: 48.758717°N 123.241017°W

Geography
- Location: South Pender Island, British Columbia
- Topo map: NTS 92B/14

Geology
- Rock age: Late Cretaceous (Nanaimo Group)

Mount Norman is a mountain on Pender Island in the Gulf Islands of British Columbia, Canada. It is the highest summit on Pender Island, and is part of the Gulf Islands National Park Reserve.

== Name and etymology ==
The mountain was named in 1860 by Captain George Henry Richards during his survey of the British Columbia coast aboard HMS Plumper. The mountain is named for Mark Norman who was a paymaster aboard HMS Ganges.

== History ==
The mountain and the surrounding Bedwell Harbour area have been part of the traditional territory of the W̱SÁNEĆ Coast Salish peoples for over 6,000 years. The Saanich name for the Pender Islands is SDȺY¸ES (wind drying).

The mountain was used for logging until 1985. In 1988, the Mount Norman Regional Park (CRD) was created, the first on the Gulf Islands. In 2003, Canada's 40th national park was created, the Gulf Islands National Park Reserve. Mount Norman was included in the park.

== Geology ==
The bedrock of Mount Norman consists of the DeCourcy Formation a stratigraphic unit within the Nanaimo Group dating to the Late Cretaceous. The formation thickness is estimated to be in excess of 450 metres.

The lithology consists of thick, bedded, sandstone (medium to very coarse grained), with fine grained sandstone, siltstone and mudstone interbeds, and minor conglomerate and pebbly sandstone.

== Hiking and recreation ==
Mount Norman is a primary hiking destination within the Gulf Islands National Park Reserve. The most popular access is the Mount Norman Trail, a 1.5 km (0.9 mi) "shore-to-sky" trek that begins at Ainslie Point Road. The trail follows an old logging road through second-growth forest, gaining approximately 200 metres (656 ft) in elevation.

At the summit, a wooden observation platform provides views of the San Juan Islands, Bedwell Harbour, and the Olympic Mountains.

== See also ==
- List of mountains of British Columbia
- Gulf Islands National Park Reserve
- Pender Island
- HMS Plumper (1848)
