= Belle Chain Islets =

Group of islands off the coast of Canada

Coordinates: 48°49′30″N 123°11′5″W

The Belle Chain Islets, originally simply the Belle Chain are a group of small islands off the north end of Saturna Island on the west side of the Strait of Georgia on the South Coast of British Columbia, Canada. The Belle Chain Islets are part of Gulf Islands National Park Reserve and are Authorized Access Only except for Lot 65 (Little Samuel Island) which is available for day use by boaters and kayakers.

== Name origin ==
The islets are believed to have been named c. 1860 for Isabel ("Belle"), youngest daughter of Captain Jeremiah Nagle, then Harbourmaster for Vancouver Island. They may also have been named after a Mr. Belle, a crewman with the Wilkes Expedition in 1841.
