= Bentinck Island =

Bentinck Island may refer to:

- Bentinck Island, British Columbia, an island in Canada
- Bentinck Island, Queensland, an island in Australia
- Bentinck Kyun, an island in Myanmar
