= Portland Island (British Columbia) =

Island in British Columbia, Canada

Coordinates: 48°44′00″N 123°22′00″W

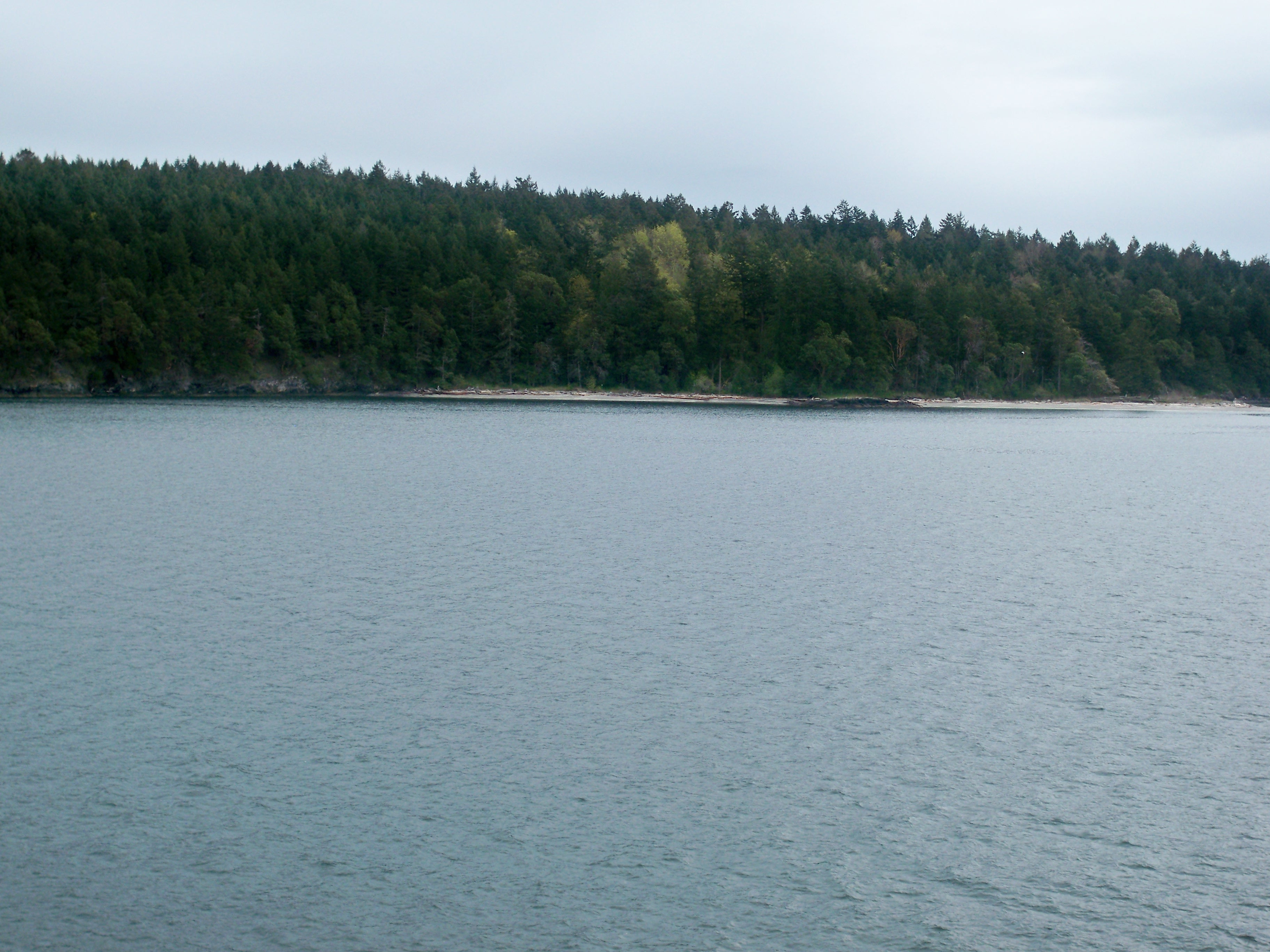
Portland Island from the west

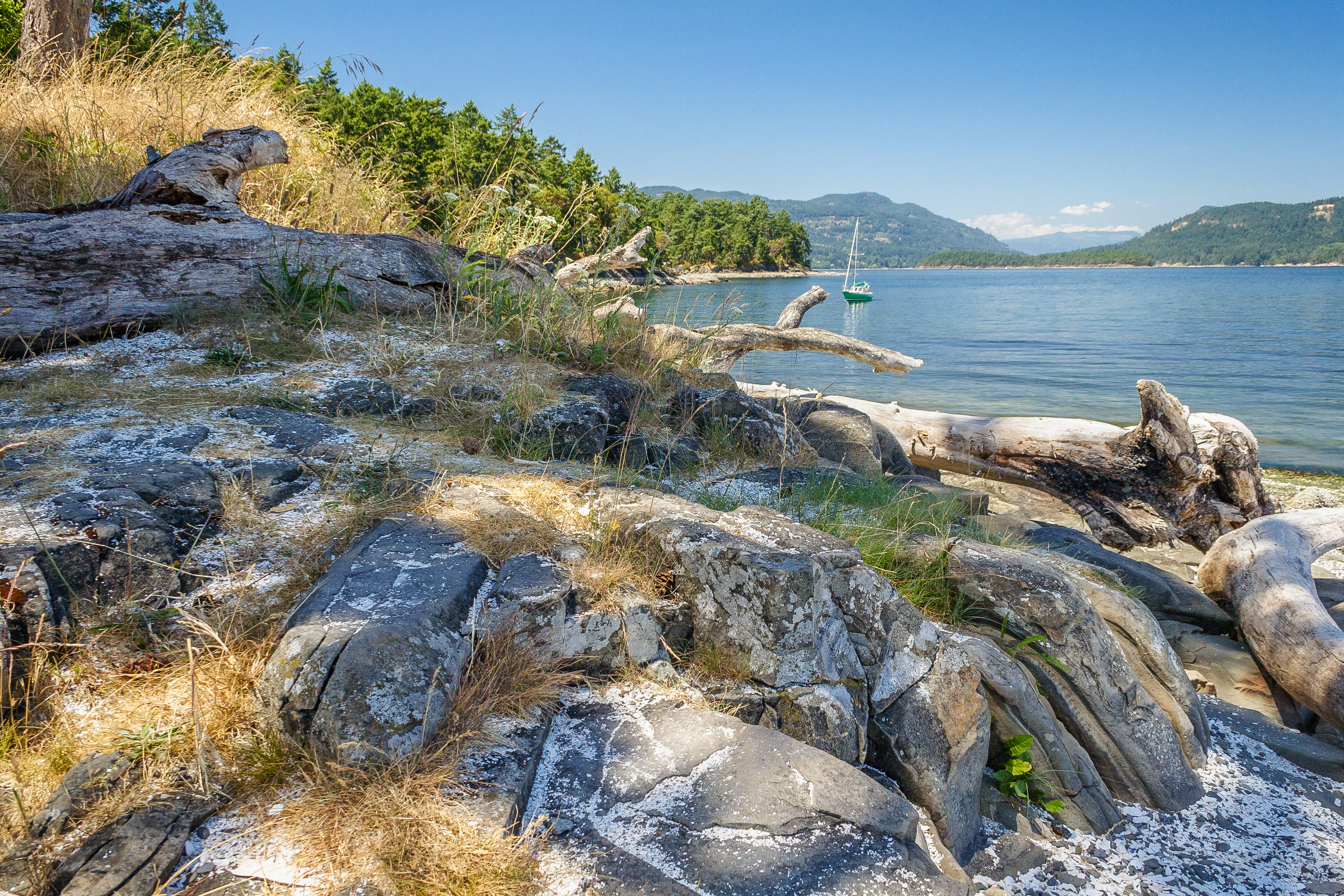
Portland Island is a popular recreational boating, kayaking and camping destination.

Portland Island is an island of the Southern Gulf Islands of the South Coast of British Columbia, Canada. It is located in the Salish Sea west of Moresby Island and off the south tip of Saltspring Island, adjacent to the main BC Ferries route just offshore from the terminal at Swartz Bay at the tip of the Saanich Peninsula. It was named after HMS Portland, the flagship of Rear-Admiral Fairfax Moresby, Commander in Chief of the Pacific Station 1850–1853.

Portland Island is separated from North Pender Island to the northeast by Swanson Passage, Moresby Island by Moresby Passage to the east, Piers Island and Coal Island to the southeast by Shute Passage, and Saltspring Island to the west and north by Satellite Channel.

Portland Island was given to Princess Margaret in 1958 to commemorate her visit to the province. Princess Margaret returned the island to British Columbia in 1967, following which it became a provincial park. Today, Portland Island is a part of Gulf Islands National Park Reserve (GINPR).

== Accessibility ==
Portland Island is accessible by private watercraft or marine charter only. There are dinghy docks available at Princess Bay and Royal Cove, and a stern-tie ring at Princess Bay. Paddlers can land at the beach accesses at Princess Bay, Arbutus Point and Shell Beach.

== Camping ==
Gulf Islands National Park Reserve offers 24 marine-accessible backcountry campsites on Portland Island: 6 sites at Shell Beach, 12 sites at Princess Bay, and 6 sites at Arbutus Point. Facilities on Portland are limited to pit toilets and no campfires are permitted.

== Hiking ==
A 6.5-kilometre (4 mi) loop trail follows the shoreline of Portland Island, and is accessible from any of the three camping areas (Shell Beach, Princess Bay, Arbutus Point). This hike requires approximately three hours to complete, but can be shortened to about one hour by taking one of the cross-island forest trails.

== External sources ==
- GINPR's Licensed Operators List
