= Pender Island Invitational =

Annual disc golf competition on Pender Island, British Columbia, Canada

- Established: October 13, 1996; 29 years ago
- Location: Pender Island, Canada
- Coordinates: 48°46′5.3652″N 123°17′25.5804″W

The Pender Island Invitational (PII) is a long-running fall disc golf competition on Pender Island, British Columbia, Canada where players compete over four days in the pursuit of The Bark, and $10 Ace-Pots.

The PII is typically played in October, typically between Thanksgiving (Canada) and Halloween.

== History ==
Begun in 1996 with a small group of players, the PII has evolved into an anticipated annual event, with players from across North America. From 1996 through 2012, the tournament duration was four days. Beginning in 2013, it was decided that the tournament duration can be reduced to a minimum of 3 days, depending on attendance.

== Venue ==
The PII is played at the Golf Island Disc Park on North Pender Island, British Columbia. The course features 27 holes, with the original nine holes (now the front nine) having tone poles, and the middle and back nines having chain baskets. The course, with its many trees and rugged landscape, winds its way over and around a rocky hill just to the north of Magic Lake. The competitors require a full arsenal of shots to compete at a high level on this challenging course.

== Ace-Pots ==
An ace is a hole-in-one in disc golf. The vast majority of holes at the Golf Island Disc Park are par-3s, and many of these are "aceable".

When a competitor aces a hole, all other players within the group must pay him $10.

== The Bark ==
The Bark

The Bark is a trophy awarded to the PII Champion.

It is made from a piece of gnarled wood from an arbutus (or Pacific Madrone) tree and has the names of past champions (Keepers of The Bark) engraved upon it. The Bark was salvaged from the Golf Island Disc Park, where arbutus trees are abundant.

The name of the 2007 2-Day Champion is also engraved on The Bark.

In the early years of the PII, the name of the player with the most aces was also engraved on the bark. However, this practice was quickly halted, due to the somewhat random nature of aces.

The Keeper of the Bark typically displays it on their mantelpiece. However, this practice is discouraged, as The Bark may be mistaken for a piece of kindling.

== Champions ==
The PII Champion (Keeper of The Bark) is the competitor with the lowest aggregate score.

Year	Keeper of The Bark	Winning Score^{(1)}	Holes Played	Length of Tournament (Days)
2025	Jason Cox	-24	134	4
2024	Jason Cox	-25	126	4
2023	Jason Cox	-29	153	4
2022	Jason Cox	-25	153	4
2021	Jason Cox	-29	162	4
2020	Kelly Sveinson	-18^{(4)}	180	4
2019	Ron Vanderdrift	-22	117	3
2018	Greg Rae	-33	162	4
2017	Kelly Sveinson	-24	144	4
2016	Greg Rae	-38	198	4
2015	Greg Rae	-54	198	4
2014	Greg Rae	-57	189	3
2013	Jason Cox	-44	171	3
2012	Greg Rae	-35	216	4
2011	Ron Vanderdrift	-40	225	4
2010	Ron Vanderdrift	-52	243	4
2009	Ron Vanderdrift	Records Missing	Records Missing	4
2008	Kelly Sveinson	-38	207	4
2007	Ron Vanderdrift	Records Missing	Records Missing	4 Bruce Hickey^{(2)}
2006	Bruce Hickey	Records Missing	Records Missing	4
2005	Kelly Sveinson	-11	198	4
2004	Greg Rae	-40	189	4
2003	Ron Vanderdrift	-70^{(3)}	225	4
2002	Records Missing	Records Missing	Records Missing	4
2001	Records Missing	Records Missing	Records Missing	4
2000	Records Missing	Records Missing	Records Missing	4
1999	Records Missing	Records Missing	Records Missing	4
1998	Kelly Sveinson	-37	135	2
1997	Records Missing	Records Missing	Records Missing	2
1996	Records Missing	Records Missing	Records Missing	2

(1) Score is in relation to par - with every hole being a par 3.

(2) 2-Day Champion. In 2007, there was both the full 4-Day tournament and a 2-Day tournament. The 4-Day Champion was the Keeper of the Bark, but the 2-Day Champion was also noted on The Bark.

(3) Last year of original course layout - which include all tone-poles. Beginning in 2004, the course layout was changed substantially, including the replacement of tone poles to chain baskets on the middle and back nines.

(4) In 2020, the Tournament was not international due to Covid-19. The 14 day quarantine waiver, for international competitors, was denied by the Provincial Government.

== Tournament Director ==
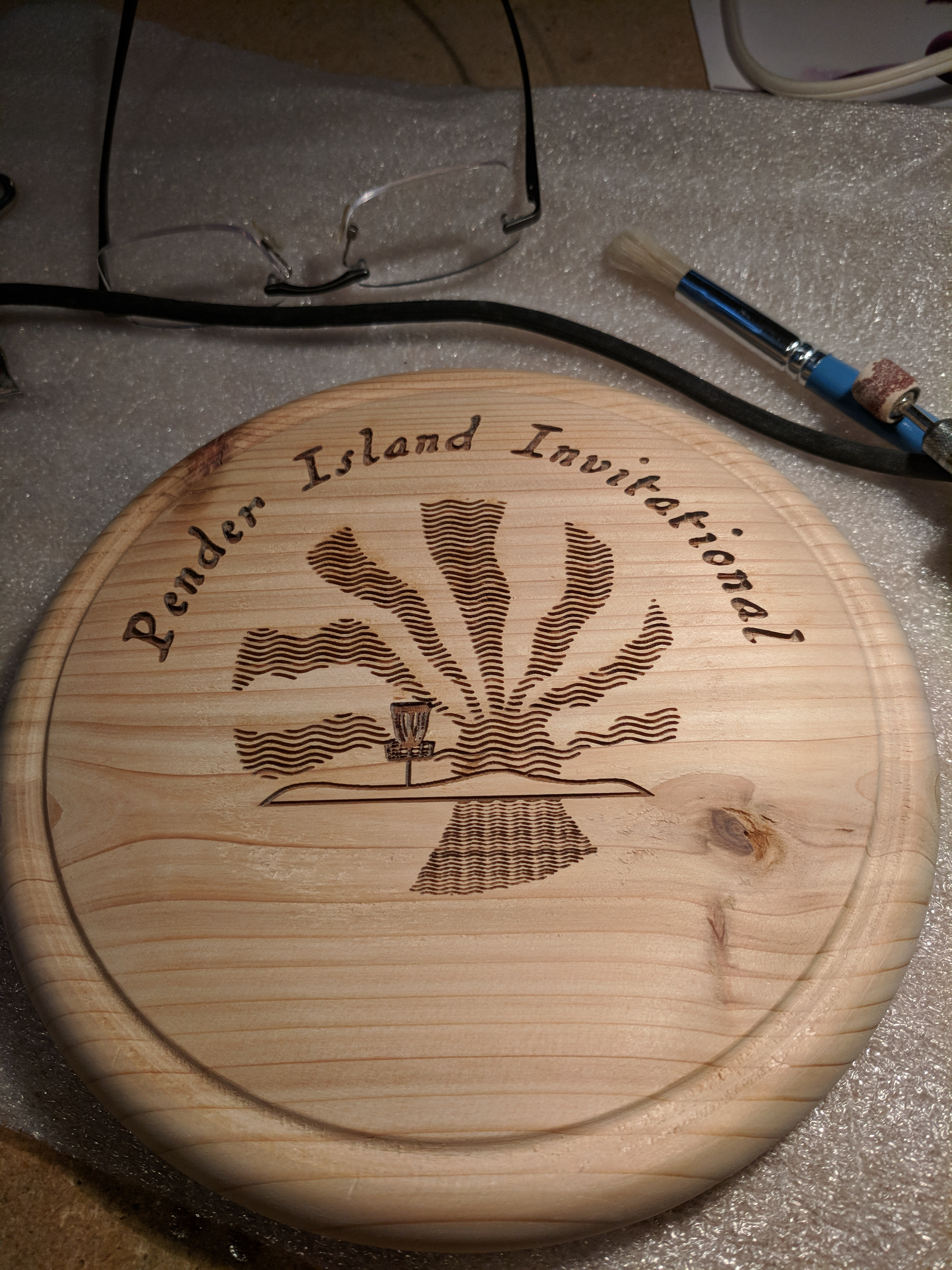
PII Director's Award

With the increased popularity of the PII, a Tournament Director was appointed in 2007 to oversee rulings, protests, and player eligibility. Jamie Britton is the PII's first and only Tournament Director. The Tournament Director will also be responsible for the distribution of invitations to future PII events. Jamie Britton is also the first recipient of the Director's Award.

== Score Keeper ==
Kelly Sveinson is the PII's official Score Keeper. At the end of each 9 holes, the official Score Keeper records each of the competitor's scores in the Official Notebook. All aces are also recorded. Scores are tallied during the weekend to determine the Champion and Keeper of the Bark.

== Historian Laureate ==
Ron Vanderdrift is the PII's official Historian Laureate. The Historian Laureate summarizes the events of tournament in an electrotonic diary (wrap-up email). These annals include the Champion and Keeper of the Bark, winning score, total holes played, number and location of Aces, and funny/significant events of the year’s tournament.

== Effect on Tourism ==
The PII has grown over the years to become recognized by the community as a significant sporting event that would appeal to locals and visitors.

== Pop Culture Influence ==
To commemorate the thirtieth annual event, a song was created by Greg Rae.

Pender XXX Song
