= McDonald Campground =

Coordinates: 48.67316°N 123.42545°W

SMONEĆTEN Campground is located in the town of Sidney on Vancouver Island, British Columbia. SMONEĆTEN Campground is 20 hectares of forested parkland and can be accessed from the Pat Bay Highway (Highway 17). Previously, SMONEĆTEN Campground was managed by the province of British Columbia and known as McDonald Campground. Today SMONEĆTEN Campground is a part of Gulf Islands National Park Reserve. The campground was renamed to SMONECTEN in 2021.

== Landscape ==
Tent pads are separated by second-growth Douglas fir, Western red cedar and broadleaf maple trees. Some sites are in the sun, others in the shade. There are municipal parks and community trails nearby to explore.

== Camping ==
SMONEĆTEN Campground is in close proximity to the town of Sidney, to the city of Victoria and to the Swartz Bay and Sidney-Anacortes ferry terminals. Victoria Regional Transit provides service to-and-from the campground . There are 49 drive-in, frontcountry campsites available. Campsites are suitable for tents, tent-trailers, truck-campers, motorhomes or recreational vehicles, but no electric hook-up is available. Amenities include potable water, pit toilets, picnic tables and fire pits (which are seasonally available). Campsites at SMONEĆTEN Campground are reservable.
