= Plumper Sound =

Coordinates: 48°46′00″N 123°13′00″W

Plumper Sound is a sound in the Southern Gulf Islands region of British Columbia, Canada, located between Saturna Island (E) and North and South Pender Islands. It is named for HMS Plumper, the survey ship of the Royal Navy engaged in charting the coastal waters of British Columbia in the colonial period.

Plumper Sound should not be confused with Plumper Cove, a small cove that is home to the Plumper Cove Marine Provincial Park on Keats Island, also named after HMS Plumper.

== See also ==
- Port Browning, British Columbia
