= Gulf Islands National Park Reserve =

National park reserve in British Columbia, Canada

- Réserve de parc national des Îles-Gulf
- IUCN category VI (protected area with sustainable use of natural resources)
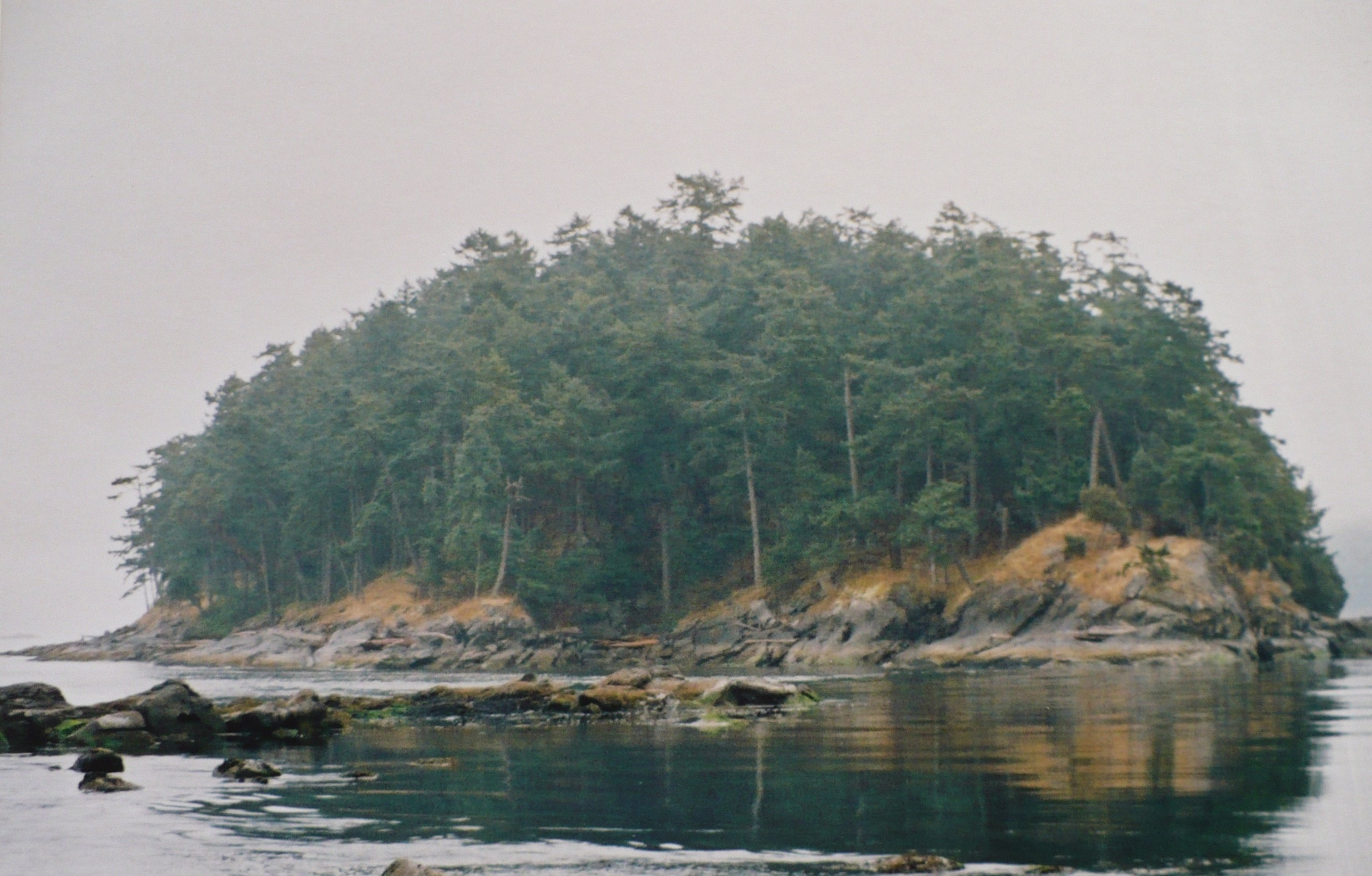
- Georgeson Island as viewed from Mayne Island

- Location within Vancouver Island Location within British Columbia Location within Canada
- Interactive map of Gulf Islands National Park Reserve
- Location: Capital RD, British Columbia, Canada
- Nearest city: Sidney
- Coordinates: 48°51′2″N 123°26′52″W
- Area: 36 km^{2} (14 sq mi)
- Established: May 9, 2003
- Visitors: 28,434 (in 2022–23)
- Governing body: Parks Canada
- Website: parks.canada.ca/pn-np/bc/gulf

Gulf Islands National Park Reserve is a national park located on and around the Gulf Islands in British Columbia, Canada. In the National Parks System Plan, this park provides representation of the Strait of Georgia Lowlands natural region, the only place in Canada with a Mediterranean climate of dry, sunny summers and mild, wet winters, the result of a rain shadow effect from surrounding mountains between the region and the ocean. It has similar dominant vegetation as the Pacific Northwest, such as coastal Douglas-fir, western red cedar, shore pine, Pacific dogwood, bigleaf maple, and red alder, but also contains the northern extent of some of the more drought tolerant trees such as Garry oak and Arbutus. The park was created in 2003 as the fortieth national park. It covers 36 square kilometres (14 sq mi) of area on 16 islands and more than 30 islets, reefs and surrounding waters, making it the sixth smallest national park in Canada.

== History ==
A high proportion of land on the Gulf Islands, over 75%, has been converted to private properties. As settlement and development was impacting character, ecosystems and recreational values, several means of conservation had been initiated. While the province was promoting tourism to the Gulf Islands and establishing provincial parks, such as, among others, D'Arcy Island Marine Park and Princess Margaret Marine Park on D'Arcy Island and Portland Island, respectively, they also established the Islands Trust whose mandate for the Gulf Islands is "to preserve and protect the trust area and its unique amenities and environment". On the federal level, the local member of parliament David Anderson advocated for an organized conservation effort and Minister of Fisheries Jack Davis commissioned, in 1971, a feasibility study of establishing a marine park. A year before, Parks Canada had released its National Parks System Plan which identified 39 natural regions which should be represented in the park system. The unrepresented Strait of Georgia Lowlands natural region, the smallest and most urbanized natural region in the country, includes the Fraser Lowland and the valleys and islands along the Strait of Georgia, like the Gulf Islands. In 1973 Parks Canada and the US Parks Service jointly published a feasibility study of creating a transboundary protected area here, along with the San Juan Islands and Point Roberts. However, with the provincial government satisfied with the provincial park system in the Gulf Islands and reluctant to forgo resource extraction and development rights, progress towards establishing a national park was delayed until the 1995 announcement of the Canada-British Columbia Pacific Marine Heritage Legacy program. Both the federal and provincial governments pledged $30 million each to acquiring land for conservation purposes generally in the Strait of Georgia area but with the intent of establishing a national park.

On July 26, 2002, 7.8 hectares (19 acres) of ecologically sensitive land on Saturna Island was donated to the Gulf Island National Park Reserve by Ulla Ressner and John Fry. The park was formally announced on May 9, 2003, with the signing of a memorandum of understanding to take the steps necessary to transfer the agreed upon 26 square kilometres (10 sq mi) of lands to the federal government for use as national park. The province followed through in April 2004 with Orders-in-Council 402-404 releasing the properties and all their rights to the Parks Canada including nine provincial parks (Beaumont Marine Park, Cabbage Island Marine Park, D'Arcy Island Marine Park, Isle-de-Lis Marine Park, Princess Margaret Marine Park, Sidney Spit Marine Park, Winter Cove Marine Park, Prior Centennial Park and McDonald Park), as well as the Saturna Island Ecological Reserve and the Brackman Island Ecological Reserve. The former-provincial parks would include almost all of the new National Park's recreational facilities (e.g. camping sites, anchorages, etc.). In addition, more land on Saturna and Pender Islands were added, as well as Reay Island, Greig Island, Hawkins Island, Imrie Island, the Belle Chain Islets, the Channel Islets, and the Red Islets, among other islets.

== Climate ==
The park, along with the Strait of Georgia Lowlands natural region, is situated in a low-lying coastal area surrounded by mountains. While the area experiences the warm air from the Pacific Ocean jet stream, the surrounding mountains of Vancouver Island and the Olympic Mountains strips that air of moisture creating a rain shadow effect. The summers are consequently dry with only a few cloudy days which is classified as a Mediterranean climate. The winters, however, are influenced by Arctic air mixing with Pacific air flows resulting in heavy precipitation and cool temperatures. The park includes a climate monitoring station, in operation since 1989, on Saturna Island; the area experiences an average of 838 mm (33 in) of precipitation each year, with over half of that falling in the four-month period between October and February.

== Ecology ==
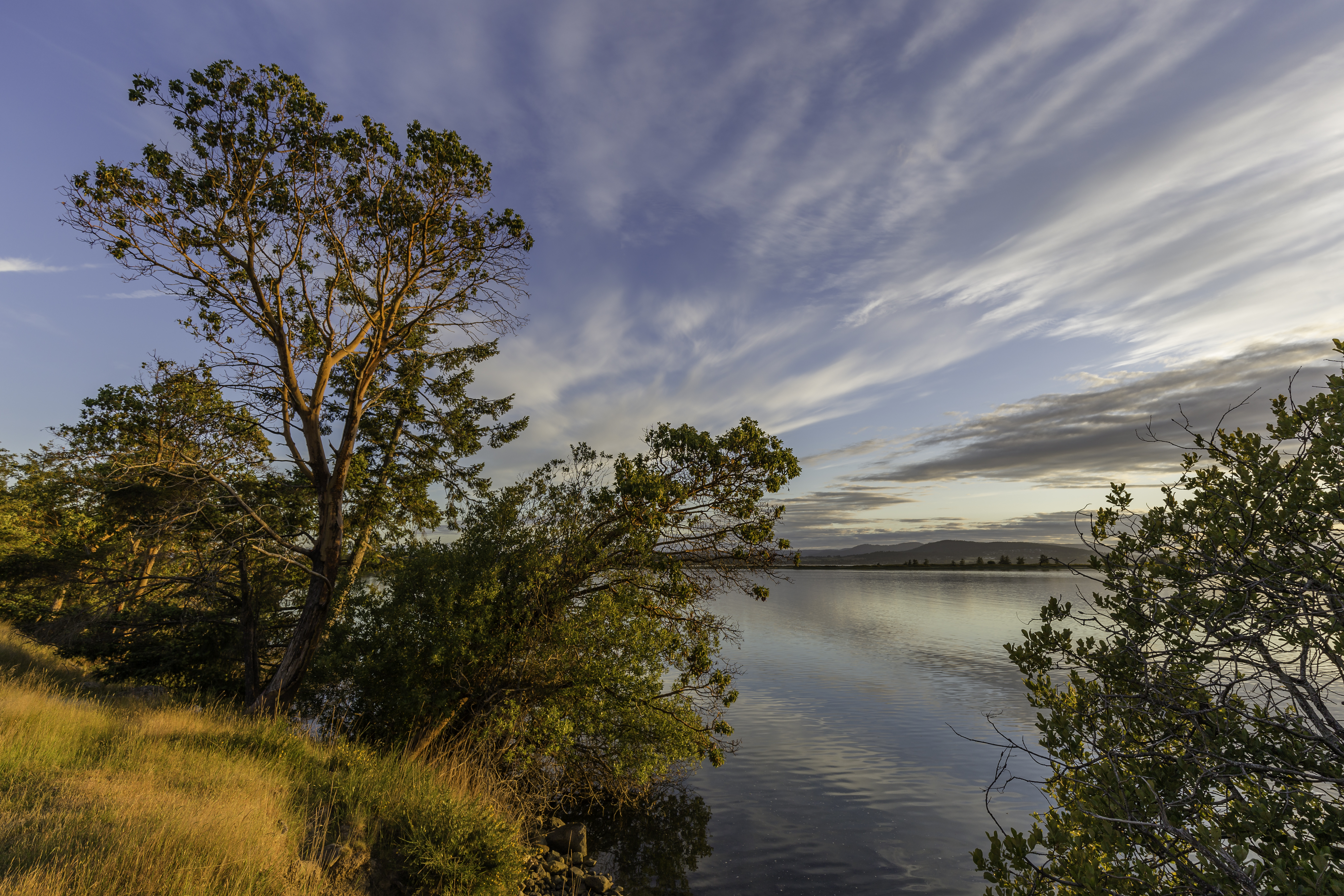
Arbutus (on the left)

The terrestrial portion of the park lies within what the province terms the Coastal Douglas-Fir Biogeoclimatic Zone based on the climax vegetation. Coastal Douglas-fir is the most common tree species and is accompanied by western red cedar and grand fir in wetter soils and Arbutus and Garry oak in drier soils. Also present are red alder, shore pine, Pacific dogwood, bigleaf maple, and bitter cherry. In the shrub layer are salal, dull Oregon-grape, oceanspray, baldhip rose, bracken fern, sword fern, lady fern and spiny wood fern. In wetter areas salmonberry, false lily of the valley, vanilla-leaf, and skunk cabbage may be present.

In the sea waters swim orcas, porpoises, seals, salmon, lingcod, shiner perch, saddleback gunnel and three-spined stickleback, among others. The largest land animal in the park would be the black-tailed deer. Fallow deer are also present but are an introduced species from some of the island's history as private hunting grounds. Other terrestrial animals include mink, river otters, raccoons and deer mice. Birds that be seen in the park include cormorant, bald eagle, red-tailed hawk, falcon, turkey vulture, rhinoceros auklet, Brant geese, great blue heron, Hermann's Gulls, and oystercatcher.

== Geography ==
The park consists of 31 km^{2} (12 sq mi) of land and 6 km^{2} (2 sq mi) of water scattered over and around 16 islands and more than 30 islets and reefs at the southern end of the Gulf Islands archipelago in the Strait of Georgia, Haro Strait and Boundary Pass on the Canadian side of the international border with the United States. The islands have a northwesterly-southeasterly alignment which is partly the result of sedimentary folding within the Nanaimo Basin. Also partly responsible for the shape of the land is the effects of the last ice age when 1.5 km of ice was top off the land and the erosive force carved out softer deposits as the melting water drained into the Pacific Ocean via the Strait of Georgia. Also, the land continues to experience post-glacial rebound which has lifted certain lands higher.

=== SMONEĆTEN Campground ===
The park's most accessible feature is the SMONEĆTEN Campground in North Saanich on Vancouver Island, just north of the Town of Sidney. While it covers a 10 ha (25 acres) area consisting of second-growth forest, the site is divided by the Highway 17 and the Swartz Bay Road overpass and surrounded by urban and agricultural development. The campground had been operated as a provincial park since 1948 before being transferred to Parks Canada in 2004. The campground includes 49 drive-in, frontcountry campsites with potable water, pit toilets, and picnic tables. In 2021, the campground was renamed from McDonald Campground to SMONEĆTEN in collaboration between Parks Canada and the W̱SÁNEĆ Leadership Council.

=== Sidney Island ===
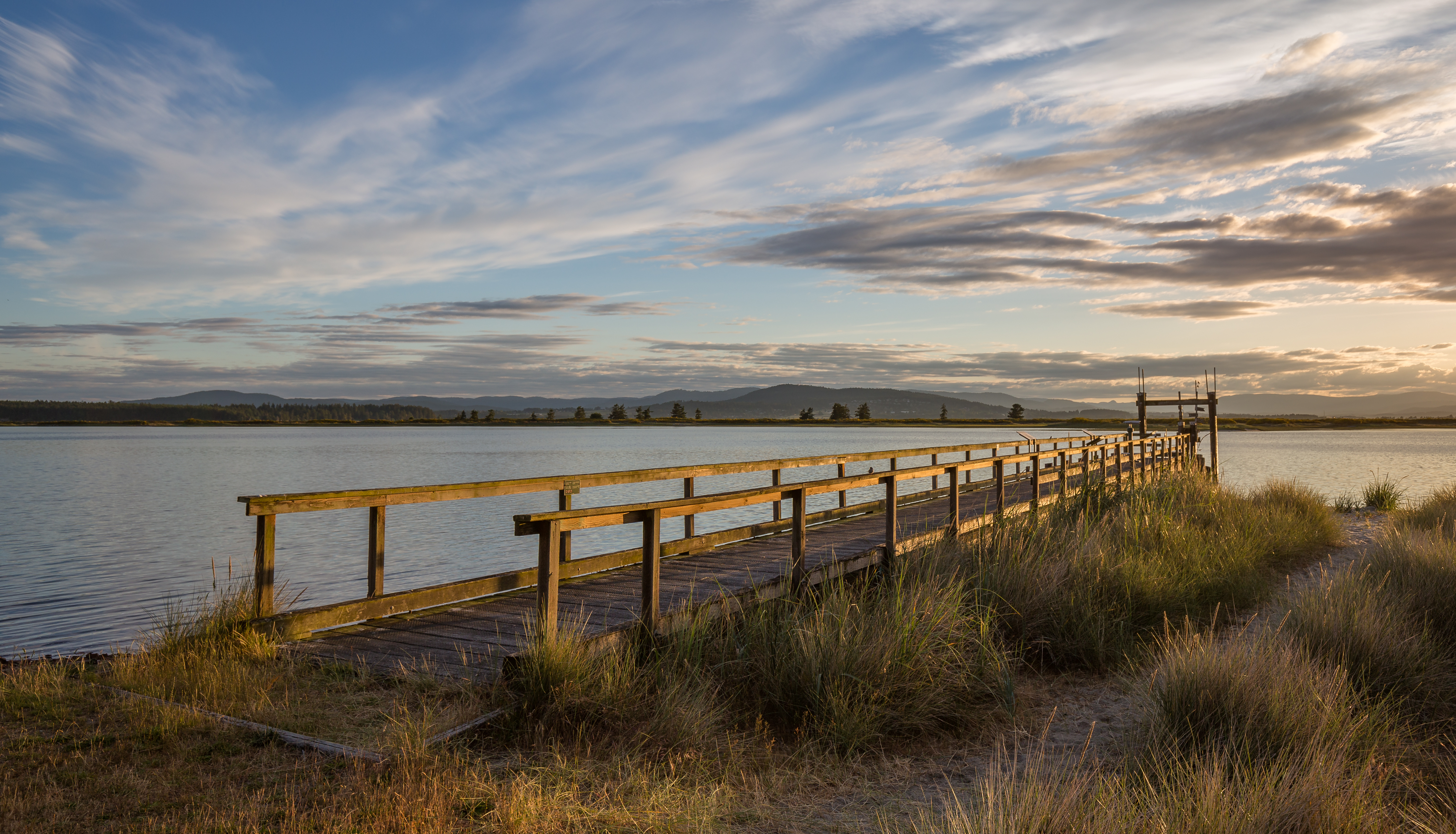
Dinghy dock (or pier) at the Sidney Island campground, with Hook Spit and Vancouver Island in the background

The Sidney Island portion of the national park comprises the northern 400 ha (988 acres) of the island along with another 220 ha (544 acres) of foreshore area. Its most prominent features are two spits which create long, sandy beaches. Sidney Spit extends for more than 2 km (1 mile) to a light beacon at its point. Hook Spit is situated partly down the island and creates a sheltered lagoon with beds of eelgrass. Located off the coast of Town of Sidney, in the Haro Strait, it is accessible only by private boat, passenger ferry or small plane via an airstrip further down the island. Like SMONEĆTEN Campground, recreational park facilities, like a campground, dock, and moorings were developed during the years when it was operated as a provincial park. Historically, this area had been used by First Nations people for clam harvesting, before being subjected to a failed residential subdivision by the Hudson's Bay Company in 1860, clay extraction for a brickworks between 1906 and 1915, logging of old growth trees, and the introduction of non-native animals like deer and peacocks from farming operations and its use as a private hunting ground before the province used the area in the late-1950s to test the concept of a marine park. Being well-received, the province formalized it as a provincial park in 1961 and developed mooring buoys and an anchoring area, with an on-shore dock for passenger ferries, a campground, pit toilets, and water taps.

=== D'Arcy Island ===
The southernmost area in the park, along with the Unit Rocks and the Sallas Rocks, is D'Arcy Island in the Haro Strait. It is an 81 ha (200 acres) island, with a 25-meter buffer of national park waters surrounding it, primarily accessible by sea kayak from Island View Regional Park in Central Saanich, or otherwise by motorboat though there are no docking or mooring facilities. Like Sidney Island, it was developed as a marine park with backcountry campsites, with pit toilets but no potable water, and cross-island hiking trails by the province beginning in 1961 before being transferred to Parks Canada in 2004. Some ruins of old buildings, along with a memorial plaque, remain from its time as a leper colony, between 1891 and 1924.

=== Isle-de-Lis ===
East of Sidney Island, and east of the privately owned Gooch Island, is the 5 ha (12 acres) Isle-de-Lis, formerly known as Rum Island as it was used by rum-runners during prohibition in the United States, being less than one mile from the international border. Isle-de-Lis was a private island until 1978 when it was bequeathed to the province for park purposes and renamed to Isle-de-Lis. Like D'Arcy Island, the province made it into a marine park primarily accessible by sea kayakers on a multi-day trip, with no docking or mooring facilities for motorboats, and added backcountry campsites with pit toilets but no potable water.

=== Portland Island ===
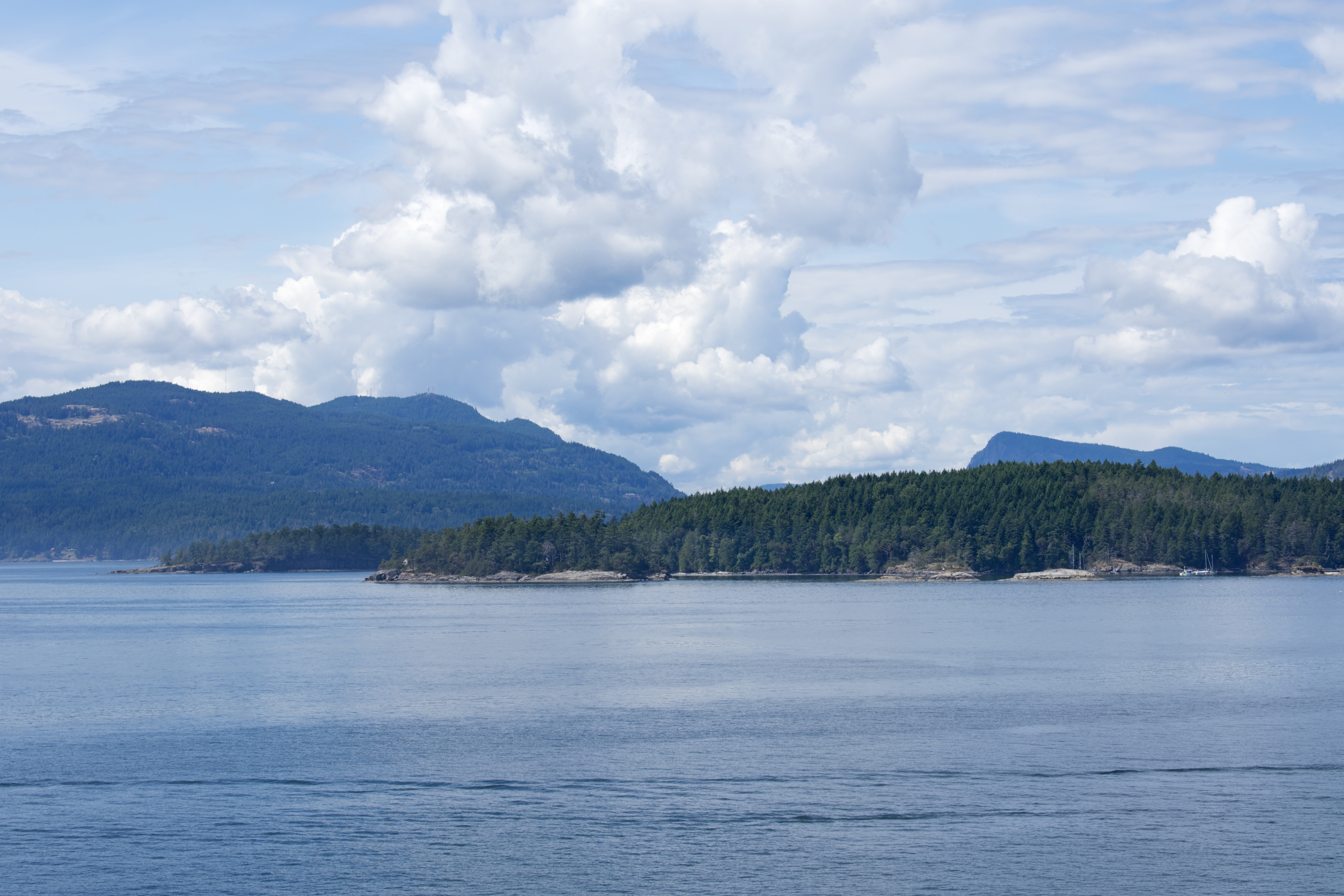
Portland Island with the Salt Spring Island at the background

On the northern end of the Haro Strait is a 575 ha (1,421 acres) area of the national park centred on Portland Island and extending 0.4 km (0.2 miles) out to include Brackman Island and numerous islets (but, excluding several private islands). Brackman Island was an ecological reserve prior to its inclusion into the national park as a special preservation area. Archaeological sites in the form of midden deposits remain on Portland Island from a long-abandoned First Nation village. Similarly, evidence remains of its use as a private island, including agricultural development and logging; though, it reverted to the provincial Crown after the owner's bankruptcy in the Great Depression. The island was given to Princess Margaret to commemorate her 1958 tour of British Columbia and she donated it back to the Crown in Right of British Columbia for park purposes. The province subsequently operated it as the Princess Margaret Marine Park with anchorages, an artificial reef suitable for scuba diving, hiking trails around the island, and three campgrounds with pit toilets, but, no potable water, until it was transferred to Parks Canada.

=== Russell Island ===
Located in the Satellite Channel off the southern coast of Salt Spring Island, Russell Island includes an anchorage area and a small dock with a 1 km (0.6 miles) loop trail for recreational use. As a cultural heritage sites, there is a foreshore clam garden developed by First Nations people and the Mahoi House developed when Russell Island was a private island owned by a Native Hawaiian family between 1886 and 1959 (and also inhabited by subsequent owner). It remained a private island until 1997 when it was purchased in the Pacific Marine Heritage Legacy program for park purposes.

=== Pender Island ===
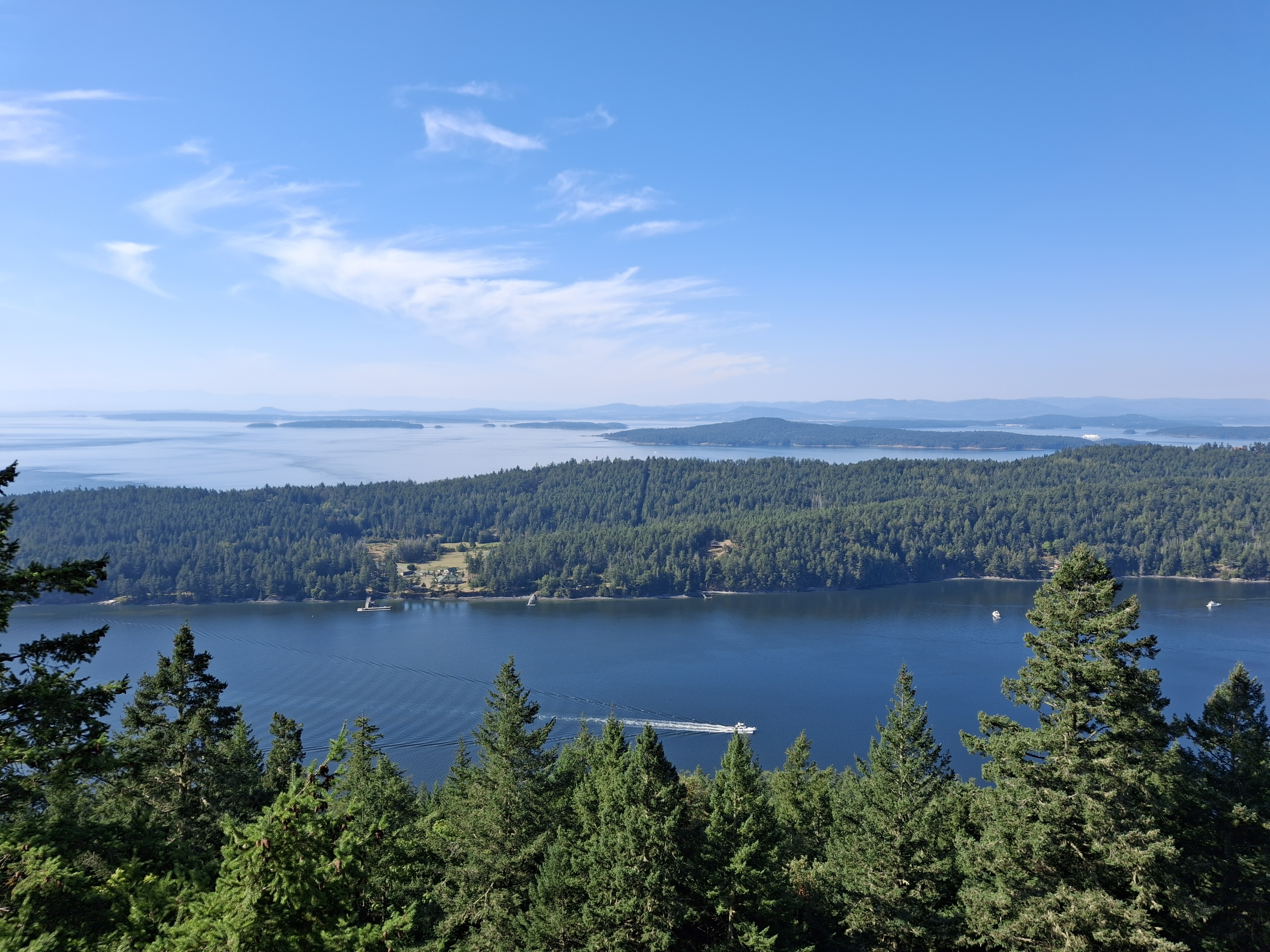
View from the summit observation platform of Mount Norman overlooking North Pender Island and Bedwell Harbour.

Pender Island is serviced by BC Ferries which allows for the use of drive-in campsites at the Prior Centennial Campground. A second campground is located along Bedwell Harbour in the former Beaumont Marine Provincial Park. In addition to the backcountry campsites, there are also mooring buoys and an anchoring area for boaters and a sandy beach access for kayakers, as well as a hiking trail along the beach and up Mount Norman. The Roesland park area on North Pender, acquired through a series of private land purchases, has a third campground. This campground is located near the shore of Shingle Bay and is accessible by kayakers or boaters as there is an anchoring area and a sandy beach access with a dinghy dock, but is also accessible via a short but steep hike from the Shingle Bay Road parking lot. This Roesland park area also includes a loop-trail around Roe Lake and a shorter hike from a historical/interpretative centre to Roe Islet (accessible during low tide). There are two other national park areas on the island. On South Pender, there is a hiking trail from Gowlland Point Road to Greenburn Lake. On North Pender, from a trailhead in an Islands Trust conservation area, there is a hiking trail up Mount Menzies through Loretta's Wood and another trail through Tyndall Wood to cliffs which overlook Plumper Sound and Saturna Island.

=== Saturna Island ===
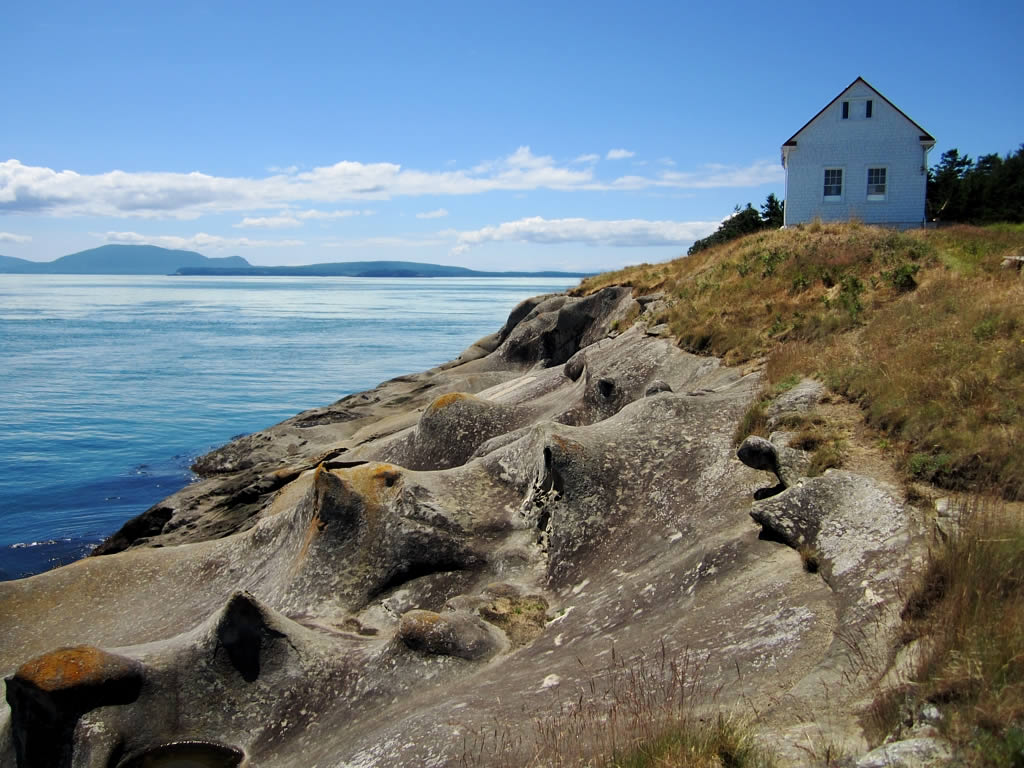
Fog Alarm Building at East Point along the sandstone shoreline of Saturna Island

Approximately half of the island is in the Gulf Islands National Park Reserve (GINPR) that was formed in 2003 from a gift of ecologically sensitive land by Ulla Ressner and John Fry, existing provincial parks, an Ecological Reserve, and other Crown land. There is also a large First Nations reserve on the island. The island has a permanent population of around 350, although that number increases significantly during the busy summer season.

The national park covers approximately 43% of Saturna Island's land base. The Ressner-Fry and other GINPR property on Mount Fisher are not accessible. The Winter Cove day use area is the most visited park area on Saturna Island. It surrounds a cove with a sheltered moorage area and a dinghy dock. On land the day use area includes a picnic area and a trail through a variety of landscapes such as forested uplands, open meadows, salt marshes, shell midden, and sandstone beaches, to a viewpoint at Boat Pass. The Narvaez Bay park area includes several connected hiking trails, along the coastline and through the forest to the Monarch Head viewpoint which overlooks Boundary Pass and the American San Juan Islands. The Narvaez Bay campground is the only campground within the island's park boundaries and is accessible by kayak, or from an off-shore anchoring area or by walking in from a parking lot. At the end of the northern peninsula is a small park area with a sandstone beach that surrounds the East Point Light Station and Fog Alarm Building with the Boiling Reef just off-shore. The middle of the island is a large park area that covers land from the valley bottom of Lyall Creek to the plateau of Mt. David and Mt. Elsford to the north and to the plateau of Mount Warburton Pike and Brown Ridge to the south. The 2 km (1 mile) Lyall Creek trail follows a salmon-bearing creek to a seasonal waterfall, while the Mount Warburton Pike trail (at the end of Staples Road) follows the grassy ridgeline at a height of 400 metres overlooking the Taylor Point trail along the southern coast of the island and Plumper Sound, Pender Island and the San Juan Islands. Similarly, the height of Mount Fisher west of Mount Warburton Pike is also included within the park, though it is not accessible. The Taylor Point trail is a 9 km (6 miles) trail along coastal bluffs, from the end of Trueworthy Road, past an abandoned sandstone quarry to Taylor Point where there are the ruins of a settler's house, constructed of sandstone in 1892.

=== Tumbo Island - Cabbage Island ===
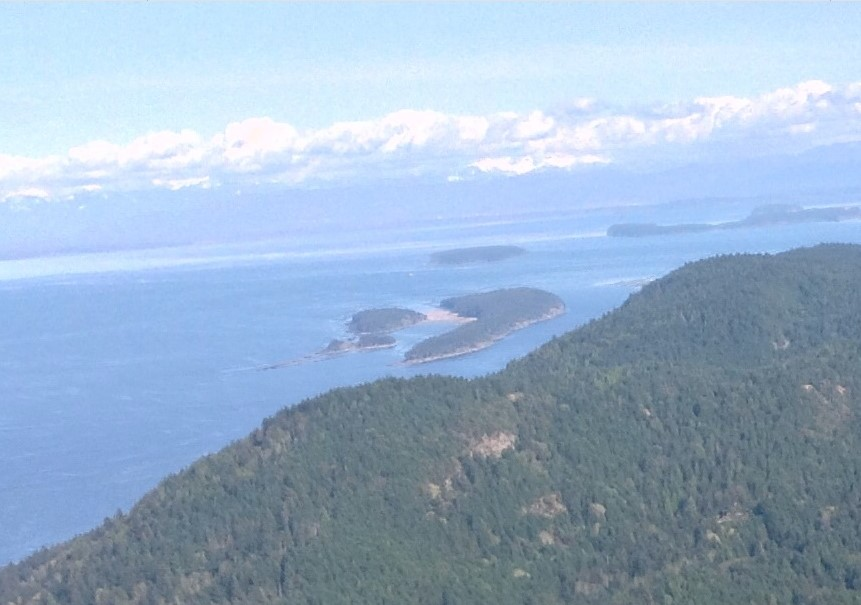
Tumbo and Cabbage Islands off the coast of Saturna Island (foreground)

Located off Saturna Island's northeastern shore, Tumbo Island and Cabbage Island are connected to each other by a reef, exposed at low tide. Cabbage Island, purchased by the Nature Conservancy from private owners in 1976, was developed as a provincial marine park between 1978 and 2004 with anchorage and moorage areas in Reef Harbour and a campground and on the 4.5 ha (11 acres) island. Tumbo, 121 ha (299 acres) in area and named in reference to a tombolo, was acquired by the province in the Pacific Marine Heritage Legacy program from a Californian for $3.7 million with the provision that he was able to keep his cottage and care-taker suite. Prior to its use as private property (since 1877) for timber harvesting, coal mining, mink farming, and recreational living, it was used by the Coast Salish people when crossing or working in the strait. Tumbo is also only accessible by boats via Reef Harbour and it beach accesses but while it does not have a campground does have a 3.5 km trail, with views of the San Juan Islands.

=== Mayne Island ===
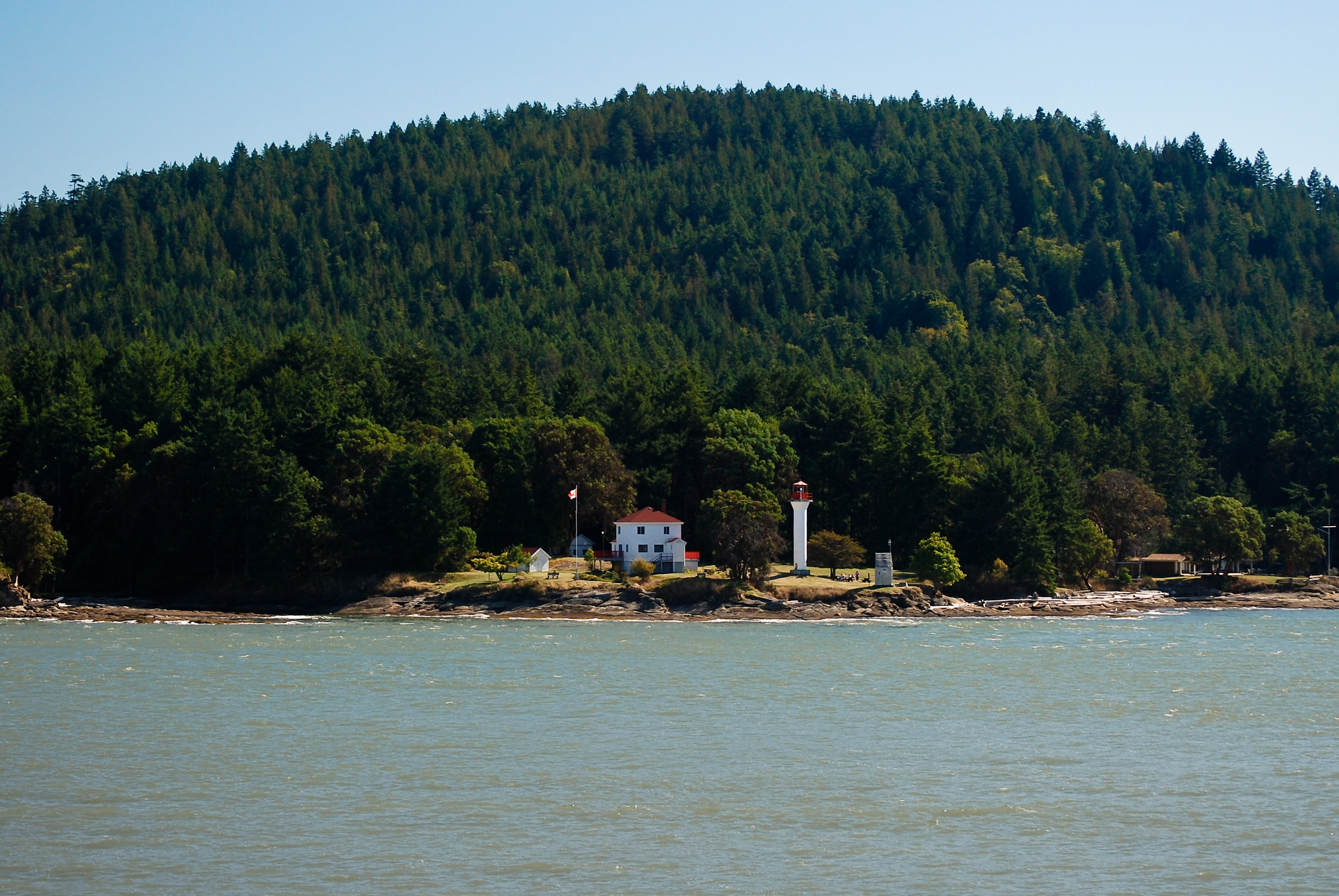
Active Pass Lighthouse on Mayne Island

There are two national park sites on Mayne Island: Campbell Point (Bennett Bay) on the eastern end and Georgina Point on the island's northwestern end. The Georgina Point Heritage Park is a 1.5 ha (4 acres) site that looks upon the Strait of Georgia and the entrance of Active Pass. It has been the site of the Active Pass Lighthouse since 1885, though that original light was replaced in 1940 with a lightkeeper's residence that included a lantern room above, and then in 1969 by an octagonal metal lantern mounted on a cylindrical concrete tower. The light function was also replaced, in 1997, by an automated navigational aid. As the historical structures remain, as well as the active radio building and aeronautical beacon maintained by the Coast Guard, it is listed as a historic place and heritage lighthouse. With the site transferred from Fisheries and Oceans Canada to Parks Canada it was further developed with picnic and washroom facilities. On the other end of the island, the 10 ha (25 acres) Campbell Point portion was acquired as a private land purchase. There is a 1.5 km (0.9 miles) hiking trail from a sandy beach, suitable for swimming and launching kayaks, to Campbell Point where there are views of Georgeson Island's old-growth forest on a sandstone ridge. Georgeson Island, along with the seal and sea lion haulouts of the Belle Chain Islets and Anniversary Island, and the small unnamed islands off Samuel Island's coast, make for a kayak route between Mayne and Saturna islands, within the national park boundaries.

=== Prevost Island ===
There are two park areas on Prevost Island. The north park site, acquired by private land purchases, extends from Peile Point around James Bay to Selby Cove, though the land on Selby Point remains privately owned. There is a campground, with a pit toilet but no potable water, on the shores of James Bay with a hiking trail to and Selby Cove. While the camping is suitable for kayakers, there are anchorage areas in James Bay and Selby Cove for boaters. On the east end of the island, the park site extends from Portlock Point around Richardson Bay to the Bright and Red Islets. This site includes the Portlock Point Lighthouse and a beach access but no campground. Between these two park sites, the national park also includes the small area of Hawkins Island off the northern coast of Prevost Island.

== See also ==
- National Parks of Canada
- List of National Parks of Canada
- Royal eponyms in Canada—other locales in Canada named for royalty akin to Princess Margaret Marine Park within the Gulf Islands National Park Reserve
