= List of straits in the United States =

These are the straits of the United States.

- Agate Pass in Puget Sound
- Arthur Kill separates Staten Island and New Jersey
- Carquinez Strait connects San Pablo Bay and Suisun Bay in California
- Chatham Strait between Chichagof Island and Admiralty Island, Alaska
- Clarence Strait between Prince of Wales Island (Alaska) and mainland Alaska
- Colvos Passage in Puget Sound
- Dalco Passage in Puget Sound
- Deception Pass in Puget Sound
- Detroit River connects Lakes Erie and St Clair
- East River between Manhattan, the Bronx and Long Island
- Erie Canal between Lake Erie and Hudson River
- Harlem River between Manhattan and The Bronx
- Kill Van Kull between Staten Island and Bayonne, New Jersey
- The Narrows between Staten Island and Brooklyn, New York
- Niagara River between Lakes Erie and Ontario
- Pickering Passage in Puget Sound
- Port Washington Narrows in Puget Sound
- Porte des Morts between Green Bay (Lake Michigan) and Lake Michigan
- Rich Passage in Puget Sound
- Sakonnet River between Aquidneck Island and Tiverton and Little Compton, Rhode Island
- San Luis Pass between Galveston Island and Texas mainland
- St. Clair River separates Lakes Huron and St Clair
- St. Mary's River separates Lakes Superior and Huron
- Straits of Florida separates the Florida peninsula from Cuba
- Strait of Juan de Fuca borders Canada
- Straits of Mackinac between Lakes Huron and Michigan

== See also ==
- List of canals in the United States
- List of rivers in the United States
- List of waterways (in the world)
