= Piers Island =

- Location of Piers Island in British Columbia
- Coordinates: 48°42′00″N 123°25′00″W
- Country: Canada
- Province: British Columbia

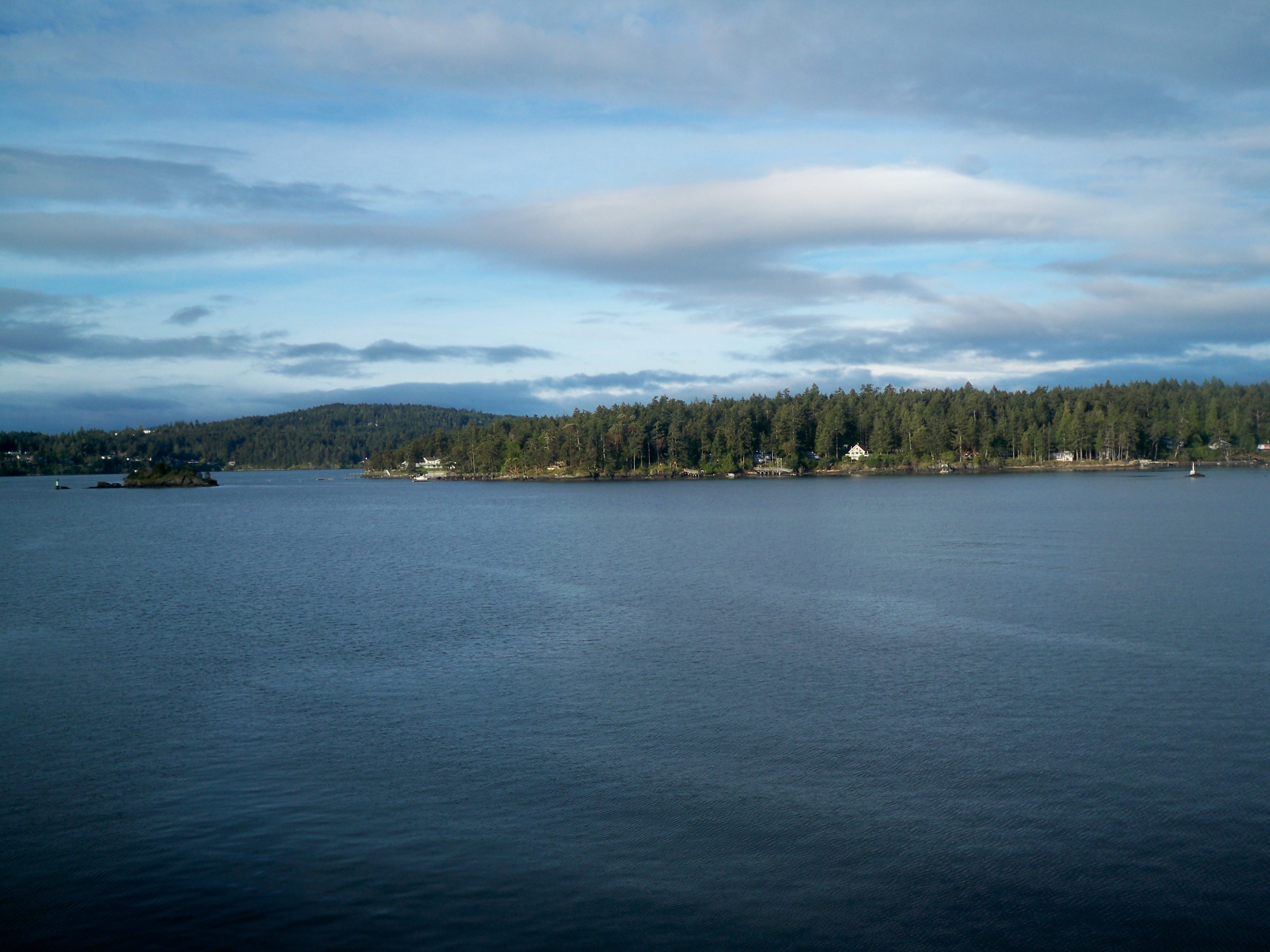
Piers Island

Piers Island is a small island in Satellite Channel, British Columbia, Canada. The channel joins Saanich Inlet on the west with Colburne Passage to Haro Strait on the east, which is the section of the Canada–US border separating the Gulf Islands in British Columbia, of which Piers is a part, from the San Juan Islands of Washington state. Haro Strait is part of the Inside Passage from Washington to Alaska through which ships can find waters relatively sheltered from Pacific Ocean waves and storms for most of its length. Piers Island is separated from the somewhat larger Portland Island by Shute Passage to the northeast.

== Name ==
The island is named for Henry Piers (d. 1902), a Royal Navy surgeon who served on HMS Satellite and HMS Investigator and at the Pacific Station (Esquimalt), later Deputy Inspector of Hospitals and Fleets.

== History ==
In the early 1930s a portion of the island was a penal colony used to house Sons of Freedom (zealots who harassed the Christian Community of Universal Brotherhood of communal Doukhobors).
