= List of canals in Canada =

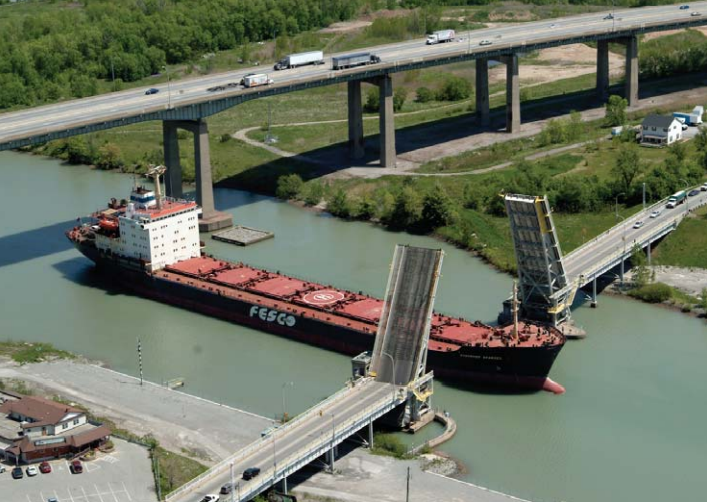
A ship passing through the Welland Canal in St. Catharines, 2017

There exists a number of canals in Canada that are used as aqueducts, diversionary channels for power stations, and for shippings.

== Natural canals ==
A natural canal exists between the Magaguadavic River and Lake Utopia outside St. George, New Brunswick.

== Shipping canals ==
=== Active ===
| Canal | Province | Length | Number of locks | Max boat length | Start point | End point | Year opened | Notes |
|---|---|---|---|---|---|---|---|---|
| Beauharnois Canal | Quebec | 24.5 km (15.2 mi) | 2 | | Lake Saint Francis | Lake Saint-Louis | 1932 | Later incorporated as a part of the Saint Lawrence Seaway |
| Canso Canal | Nova Scotia | 0.56 km (0.35 mi) | 1 | 230 m (740 ft) | St. George's Bay | Chedabucto Bay | 1955 | |
| Carillon Canal | Quebec | 21 km (13 mi) | 1 | | Ottawa River | Ottawa River | 1830 | |
| Chambly Canal | Quebec | 20 km (12 mi) | 9 | | Richelieu River (Chambly) | Richelieu River (Saint-Jean-sur-Richelieu) | 1843 | |
| Dougall Canal | Ontario | 0.8 km (0.50 mi) | | | Lake Couchiching | Lake Couchiching | c. 1960s | Forms part of the Trent–Severn Waterway |
| Lachine Canal | Quebec | 14.5 km (9.0 mi) | 5 (Note: The Lachine Canal initially had seven locks when it opened. The number of locks was reduced to five during the canal's expansion in the 1840s.) | | Saint Lawrence River (Old Port of Montreal) | Lake Saint-Louis | 1825 | |
| Murray Canal | Ontario | 8 km (5.0 mi) | | | Bay of Quinte | Lake Ontario | 1889 | |
| Pender Canal | British Columbia | 200 m (0.12 mi) | | | Bedwell Harbour | Port Browning | 1903 | |
| Rideau Canal | Ontario | 202 km (126 mi) | 47 | 27 m (90 ft) | Ottawa River (Ottawa) | Lake Ontario (Kingston) | 1832 | |
| Saint Lawrence Seaway | Ontario & Quebec (Note: Portions of the Saint Lawrence Seaway also extends into the US state of New York.) | 600 km (370 mi) | 15 | 230 m (740 ft) | Saint Lawrence River (Old Port of Montreal) | Lake Erie (Port Colborne) | 1959 | |
| Sainte-Anne-de-Bellevue Canal | Quebec | | | | Lake Saint-Louis | Lake of Two Mountains | 1843 | |
| Sault Ste. Marie Canal | Ontario | 1.6 km (0.99 mi) | 1 | | St. Marys River | St. Marys River | 1895 | |
| St. Peters Canal | Nova Scotia | 0.8 km (0.50 mi) | 1 | 91 m (300 ft) | Bras d'Or Lake | Atlantic Ocean (St. Peter's) | 1869 | |
| Tay Canal | Ontario | 9.8 km (6.1 mi) | 2 | 27 m (90 ft) | Tay River | Lower Rideau Lake | 1891 | Currently operated as a part of the Rideau Canal |
| Trent-Severn Waterway | Ontario | 386 km (240 mi) | 44 | 26 m (84 ft) | Georgian Bay (Severn) | Bay of Quinte (Trenton) | 1833 | |
| Welland Canal | Ontario | 43 km (27 mi) | 8 | 230 m (740 ft) | Lake Ontario (St. Catharines) | Lake Erie (Port Colborne) | 1829 | Later incorporated as a part of the Saint Lawrence Seaway |

=== Abandoned ===
| Canal | Province | Length | Number of locks | Start point | End point | Year opened | Year closed | Notes |
|---|---|---|---|---|---|---|---|---|
| Baillie-Grohman Canal | British Columbia | 1.5 km (0.93 mi) | | Columbia River | Kootenay River | 1889 | 1902 | |
| Coteau-du-Lac canal | Quebec | 100 m (330 ft) | 3 | | | 1781 | | |
| Desjardins Canal | Ontario | | | Cootes Paradise | Hamilton Harbour | 1837 | 1895 | |
| Newmarket Canal | Ontario | 16 km (9.9 mi) | 3 | Lake Simcoe | East Holland River (Newmarket) | — | — | The canal was cancelled during its construction. |
| Shubenacadie Canal | Nova Scotia | 114 km (71 mi) | 1 (Note: The Shubenacadie Canal initially had nine locks and two inclined planes. The number of operational locks was eventually reduced to one.) | Halifax Harbour (Dartmouth) | Cobequid Bay (Maitland) | 1856 | 1871 | |
| Soulanges Canal | Quebec | | 5 | | | 1899 | 1958 | |
| Welland Recreational Waterway | Ontario | | | Welland Canal | Welland Canal | | c. 1970s | The waterway formed a part of the original alignment for the Welland Canal that passed Welland, prior to the completion of the Welland By-Pass in the 1970s. Motorboats are prohibited from the Welland Recreational Waterway. |

Parts of the Rouge River in Markham, Ontario were being planned by William Berczy in the 1790s as a navigation route between Lake Simcoe and Lake Ontario via Holland River but did not progress beyond clearing of 24 miles along the route.

== Other types of canals ==
| Canal | Province | Start point | End point | Notes |
|---|---|---|---|---|
| Canal de l'Aqueduc | Quebec | | City of Montreal pumping station (Pointe-Saint-Charles) | Open-air aqueduct canal used by the city of Montreal. |
| Kootenay Canal | British Columbia | Kootenay River | Kootenay River | Diversionary canal for the Kootenay Canal hydroelectric plant. |
| Seton Canal | British Columbia | Seton Lake | Fraser River | Diversionary canal for the Seton Powerhouse. |
