= Bentinck Island, British Columbia =

Coordinates: 48.314°N 123.544°W

Bentinck Island is a small island in the Strait of Juan de Fuca just off the southern tip of Vancouver Island in Metchosin, British Columbia, Canada near Race Rocks. It served as a leper colony beginning in 1924, when the federal government shut down D'Arcy Island (also a leprosy colony), as Bentinck Island was closer to medical quarantine facilities, until 1957, when the last person affected by leprosy died.

The Holland America cargo liner Eemdijk ran aground on Race Rocks on 15 October 1925. She was refloated on 19 October and beached on Bentinck Island. The tug Hope and her crew of seven were lost trying to salvage the liner.
