= D'Arcy Island =

Canadian island in the Pacific Ocean

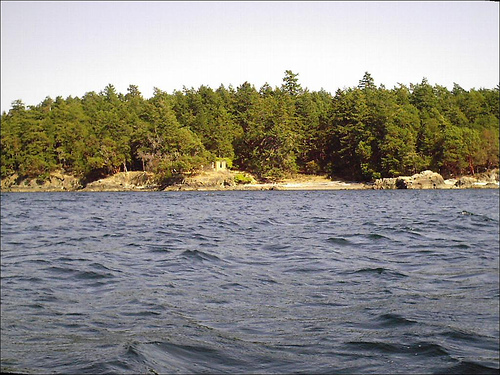
- D'Arcy Island from the west

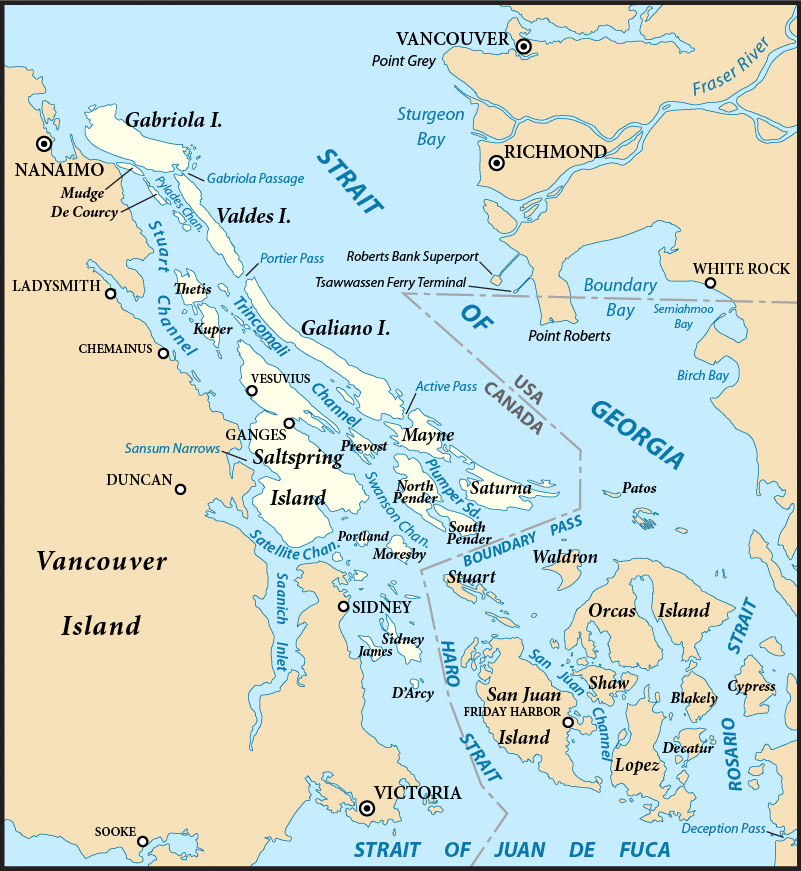
- Gulf Islands, including D'Arcy Island to the south

Geography
- Location: British Columbia, Canada
- Coordinates: 48°33′59″N 123°16′44″W
- Adjacent to: Haro Strait
- Area: 83 ha (210 acres)

D'Arcy Island is an 83-hectare (210-acre) island in Haro Strait, south of Sidney Island and east of the Saanich Peninsula (Vancouver Island). It is the southernmost of the Gulf Islands and is part of the Gulf Islands National Park Reserve.

== History ==
The island was used as a leper colony for Chinese immigrants from 1891 to 1924, when the inhabitants were moved to Bentinck Island, closer to Victoria. Ruins of the time's buildings still visible.

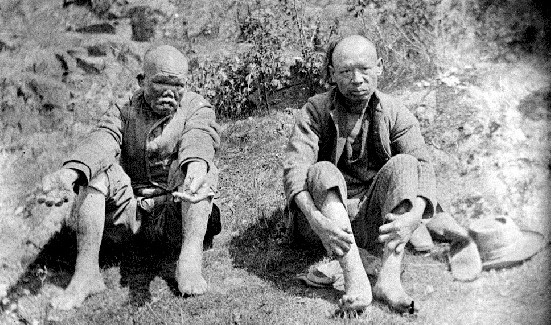
Chinese lepers on D'Arcy Island in the 1890s

D'Arcy Island's proximity to the border with the United States was exploited by American bootlegger Roy Olmstead in the smuggling of Canadian liquor, primarily whisky, to Washington State. His operation would transport the liquor from Victoria, British Columbia, to islands in Haro Strait, including D'Arcy, for later pickup by smaller craft that would move the contraband during rough weather, making it more difficult for the Coast Guard to detect them.

D'Arcy was declared a marine park in 1961 and included as part of the Gulf Islands National Park Reserve in 2003.

== Access ==
D'Arcy is accessible by private watercraft only.

== Camping ==
Gulf Islands National Park Reserve offers seven marine-accessible backcountry campsites on D'Arcy. Facilities are limited to pit toilets and picnic tables. There is no drinking water available, and no campfires are permitted.
