= List of transcontinental canals =

The following is a list of transcontinental canals and waterways, that is, canals or canal proposals, which allows waterway traffic to span across a continent or subcontinent.

== List ==
Canal	Place	Location	Map	Status	Endpoints	Notes
Grand Canal	Chinese subcontinent	34°41′38″N 112°28′6″E		Construction began 15th c. BC; First major section completed in 6th c. BC; First Grand Canal completed 6th c. CE; In-operation	South China; North China Plain	Bypassing the eastern coast of China, it provides a stable pirate-free wave-free channel for ship transport and water transport, crossing across the North China continental block.
Rhine–Main–Danube Canal	European continent	49°11′30″N 11°15′3″E		Initially proposed by Charlemagne; Post-War WWII reconstruction completed 1992; In-operation	North Sea; Black Sea	Channelizing the Rhine, the Main and the Danube, and connecting with a canal crossing the European Continental Divide, it traverses Europe. When combined with the Marne–Rhine Canal, it connects to the English Channel. With the addition of the proposed Danube–Oder Canal, the waterway system would also access the Baltic Sea.
Saint Lawrence Seaway and Great Lakes Waterway	Eastern North America	43.7°N 77.9°W		Completed 1959; In-operation	Great Lakes; Atlantic Ocean (Gulf of Saint Lawrence)	Following the route of the Saint Lawrence River, it allows access to the centre of the continent from the ocean by shipping. When combined with the New York State Canal System, it has a second access to the ocean at Long Island Sound / Hudson Estuary, turning New England into a virtual island. When combined with the Illinois Waterway, it can reach the Gulf of Mexico from the Great Lakes, turning the entire East Coast and Midwest of the United States into a virtual island.
Mississippi River System	Central United States			In-operation	Gulf of Mexico; Great Lakes	Channelizing the Mississippi River and major tributaries/distributaries, it accesses central North America. With the Saint Lawrence Seaway it reaches the Gulf of Saint Lawrence, and turns the Midwest and East Coast of the United States into a virtual island.
Intracoastal Waterway	East Coast and South Coast of North America			In-operation	Boston; Chesapeake; Florida; Brownsville	Following the coastline of North America, wrapping all the way around the coast of the United States, a series of canals, channelized waters, navigable sheltered natural waters, allow protection from the open ocean.
Unified Deep Water System of European Russia	Russia			In-operation	Baltic Sea; Black Sea; Caspian Sea; White Sea	Traversing across European Russia, the shipping waterway accesses the Atlantic and Arctic Ocean basins, and combined with the Suez Canal, accesses the Indian Ocean as well.
Eurasia Canal (Caspian Canal)	Caucasus			Proposed	Caspian Sea; Black Sea	Connecting the Caspian and the Black Seas, it would complete the Manych Ship Canal and Volga–Don Canal to fully connect the two seas with a shipping route.
Iranrud (Caspian Canal)	Iran	35°41′N 51°25′E		Proposed	Caspian Sea; Indian Ocean (Persian Gulf or Gulf of Oman)	Russian plan for independence from the Bosphorus, Straits of Gibraltar, Suez Canal; by digging a canal to connect to the Indian Ocean from the Caspian Sea. through the Iranian Plateau and Iran; needing to cross mountains over 1,600 m (5,200 ft) high and being over 1,400 km (870 mi) long.
Canal des Deux Mers	France			In-operation	Mediterranean Sea; Atlantic Ocean	The Canal des Deux Mers (English: Two Seas Canal) has been used to describe two different but similar things since the 1660s. In some cases, it describes the entire path from the Atlantic to the Mediterranean, including two canals, the Canal du Midi and the Canal Latéral de la Garonne. In others it is used interchangeably with the Canal du Midi in particular.

== See also ==
- List of interoceanic canals
- Lists of canals
