= List of interoceanic canals =

The following is a list of interoceanic canals, that is, canals or canal proposals, which form waterways for traffic to connect one ocean to another.

== List ==
| Canal | Place | Location | Map | Status | Oceans | Notes |
|---|---|---|---|---|---|---|
| Canal of the Pharaohs | Egypt | 30°20′N 32°23′E | | Used in the Late Period to early Islamic period; In ruins | Atlantic Ocean (Mediterranean Sea); Indian Ocean (Red Sea) | This ancient canal once connected the Suez Rift Valley to the Nile River. |
| Suez Canal | Isthmus of Suez | 30°42′18″N 32°20′39″E | | Completed 1869; In-operation | Atlantic Ocean (Mediterranean Sea); Indian Ocean (Red Sea) | The level (lock-less) canal follows the Suez Rift Valley, from the Gulf of Suez to the Mediterranean |
| Palestine Canal | Israel | 31°30′N 35°30′E | | Proposed | Atlantic Ocean (Mediterranean Sea); Indian Ocean (Red Sea) | From the Gulf of Aqaba to the Dead Sea to the Mediterranean, the modern version would expand two proposed water conveyance canals (Red Sea to Dead Sea, and, Mediterranean Sea to Dead Sea) into ship canals. Various proposals have existed since the construction of the Suez Canal. |
| Panama Canal | Isthmus of Panama | 9°04′48″N 79°40′48″W | | Completed 1914; In-operation | Atlantic Ocean (Caribbean Sea); Pacific Ocean | This lock-encumbered canal takes advantage of the Chagres River, used to create Gatun Lake, over the western side of the continental divide |
| Nicaragua Canal | Central America | 11.5°N 85.0°W | | Proposed | Atlantic Ocean (Caribbean Sea); Pacific Ocean | Proposals use Lake Nicaragua to shorten the built canal distance |
| Honduras Canal | Central America | | | Proposed | Atlantic Ocean (Caribbean Sea); Pacific Ocean | |
| Guatemala Canal | Central America | | | Proposed | Atlantic Ocean (Caribbean Sea); Pacific Ocean | |
| Mexico Canal | Isthmus of Tehuantepec | 17.213°N 94.740°W | | Proposed | Atlantic Ocean (Gulf of Mexico); Pacific Ocean | One of the proposed paths connects the Goatzacoalcos River to Tehuantepec |
| Thai Canal (Kra Canal) | Malay Peninsula | 10°11′N 98°53′E | | Proposed | Indian Ocean (Andaman Sea); Pacific Ocean (Gulf of Thailand) | A level crossing across the Kra Isthmus would need to dig out the Tenasserim Hills |
| White Sea–Baltic Canal | Russia | 62°48′N 34°48′E | | Completed 1933; In-operation | Atlantic Ocean (Baltic Sea); Arctic Ocean (White Sea) | |

== See also ==
- List of transcontinental canals
- Lists of canals
