= Port Browning, British Columbia =

Bay in British Columbia, Canada

Coordinates: 48°46′36.51″N 123°16′16.46″W

Port Browning, British Columbia, Canada is formed between North and South Pender Islands in the British Columbia Gulf Islands. There is a government dock and commercial marina at the head of the inlet. From Port Browning, Pender Canal leads to Bedwell Harbour. Port Browning also leads eastward to Plumper Sound.
