= Bedwell Harbour =

Location of Bedwell Harbour in British Columbia

Bedwell Harbour is a harbour between South Pender Island and North Pender Island in British Columbia. Bedwell Harbour is close to the Canada–US border in Boundary Pass, and it is an official port of entry for sailors from the United States.

The Bedwell Harbour Water Aerodrome is located in Bedwell Harbour. Northeast of the settlement lies Skull Islet.

GPS location: 48.747°N 123.226°W

== See also ==
Port Browning, British Columbia
