= List of canals in Massachusetts =

This list is intended to contain all significant canals and aqueducts in the Commonwealth of Massachusetts, USA. It includes both vanished waterways and those that still exist.

- Blackstone Canal, Grafton
- Broad Brook Canal, Ludlow
- Cambridge canals
  - Broad Canal
  - Lechmere Canal
- Cape Cod Canal, Sagamore
- Fort Point Channel, Boston
- Hampshire and Hampden Canal, Hampshire and Hampden Counties
- Hecla Canal, Blackstone
- Holyoke canals
  - First Level Canal
  - Second Level Canal
  - Third Level Canal
- Lowell canals
  - Eastern Canal
  - Hamilton Canal
  - Lawrence Wasteway
  - Massachusetts Wasteway
  - Merrimack Canal
  - Merrimack Wasteway
  - Northern Canal
  - Pawtucket Canal
  - Western Canal
- Long Pond Canal, Lakeville
- Madaket Ditch, Nantucket
- Mattakeset Herring Creek, Edgartown
- Middlesex Canal, Middlesex County
- Mill River Diversion, Easthampton
- Mother Brook, Dedham
- North Canal, Lawrence
- Northfield Mountain Tailrace Tunnel, Millers Falls
- Salem Beverly Waterway Canal, Beverly
- South Hadley Canal, South Hadley
- Turners Falls Canal, Turners Falls
