= List of canals in Texas =

== Transportation canals ==
- Intracoastal Waterway
- Houston Ship Channel
- Sabine–Neches Waterway

== Irrigation canals ==
See Texas Irrigation Canals

- Franklin Canal (Texas)
- Riverside Canal (El Paso)
- American Canal
