= Pender Island =

- Island
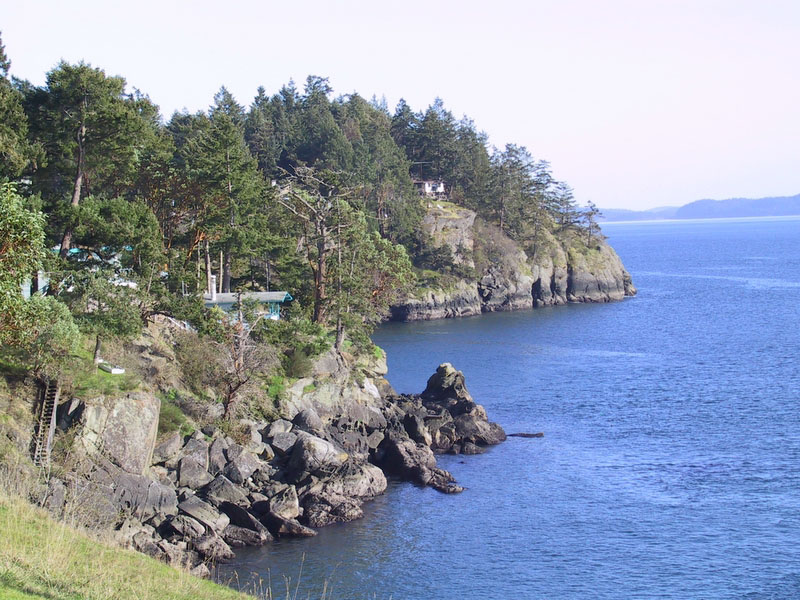
- A view of North Pender Island's shoreline

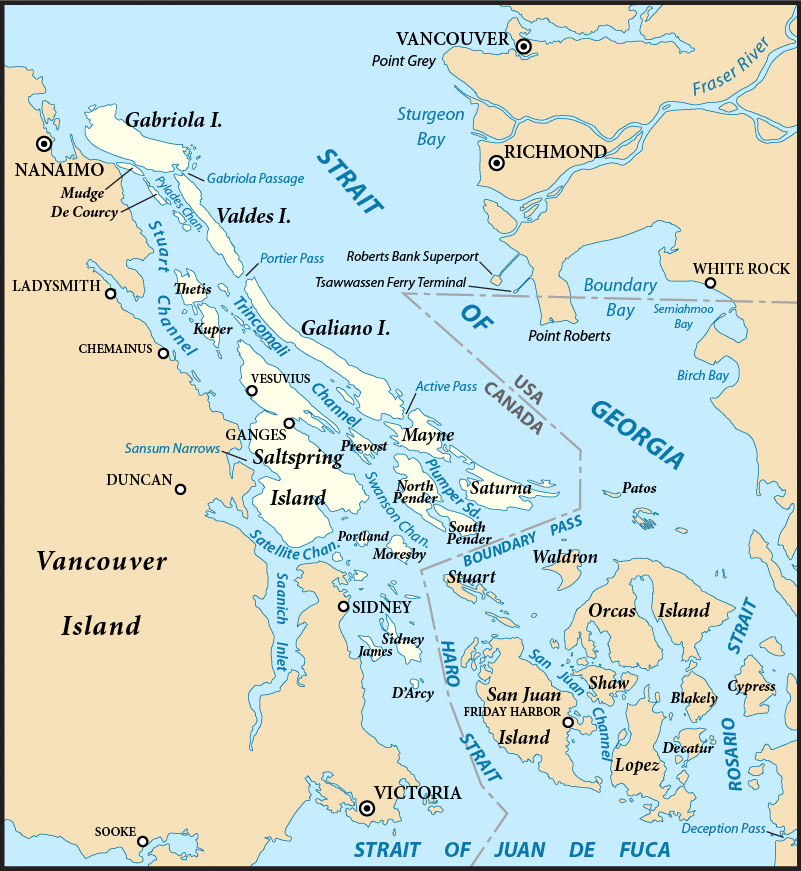
- The Southern Gulf Islands, including North and South Pender.
- Country: Canada
- Province: British Columbia

Government
  - MP: Elizabeth May (Green)
  - MLA: Rob Botterell (Green)

Area
  - Total: 34 km^{2} (13 sq mi)

Population
  - Total: 2,245
- Time zone: UTC−07:00 (Pacific Time)

Pender Island (Saanich: st̕ey̕əs) is the collective name for two Southern Gulf Islands located in the Salish Sea, British Columbia, Canada. The Pender Islands, consisting of North Pender Island and South Pender Island, have a combined area of approximately 34 km^{2} (13 sq mi). The Islands are home to about 2,250 permanent residents, as well as a large seasonal population. Like most of the rest of the Southern Gulf Islands, the Pender Islands enjoy a sub-Mediterranean climate and feature open farmland, rolling forested hills, several lakes and small mountains, as well as many coves and beaches.

== Geography ==
Pender Island consists of two islands, North Pender and South Pender, which are separated by a narrow canal originally dredged in 1903. In 1955 the islands were connected by a one lane bridge.

Most of the population and services reside on North Pender Island, with the highest concentration surrounding Magic Lake.

Sencot'en place names on Pender Island (st̕ey̕əs) include ʔiləčən (Bedwell Harbor), and x̣ʷəl̕isən̕ (Port Browning). North Pender Island place names include:

- šxʷsəɬqʷsət (Shark Cove)
- x̣ʷəx̣ʷiʔéčsəŋ (Shingle Bay)
- kʷeqsən (Stanley Point)
- kʷeqsən (Boat Nook)
- təlasəŋ̕ (Hope Bay)
- sq̕ʷəq̕ʷiŋ̕əs (Oaks Bluff)
- q̕eʔƛ̕əŋ or sq̕eʔəƛ̕əm (Otter Bay)
- x̣ʷiʔx̣ʷnəčénəm or sx̣ʷix̣ʷθəʔ (Wallace Point)

Similarly, a few geographic names on South Pender Island include the following:

- sk̕ʷən̕enxʷ (Gowlland Point)
- st'eyus (Bedwell Harbour)
- smanəč (Teece Point)

== History ==
At the time of European Contact, Pender Island was inhabited by Coast Salish peoples speaking the North Straits Salish language. There is an Indian reserve at Hay Point on South Pender Island, which is home to members of the Tsawout and Tseycum First Nations. Carbon dating of artifacts in shell middens near Shark Cove identify an Indigenous village site that has been more or less continuously inhabited for five millennia. The Poets Cove Resort was built on an ancient First Nations village site. The provincial government's 2007 settlement with the Tsawwassen First Nation included hunting and fishing rights on and around Pender Island—an arrangement to which the Sencot'en Alliance objected, saying those rights are theirs under the 1852 Douglas Treaty.

A Spanish expedition led by Francisco de Eliza visited Pender in 1791, naming it "Ysla de San Eusevio". The islands, along with Pender Harbour on the Sunshine Coast, were named by Captain Richards for Staff Commander, later Captain, Daniel Pender, RN who surveyed the coast of British Columbia aboard HMS Plumper, HMS Hecate, and Beaver from 1857 to 1870. The first permanent resident of European descent arrived on South Pender Island in 1886. Plumper Sound, the body of water between Mayne, Pender, and Saturna islands, is named for HMS Plumper.

In 1903, residents of Pender Island petitioned the government to dredge the isthmus between North and South Pender Islands.

== Culture and Recreation ==
Pender Island is a popular destination for fishing, boating, scuba diving, and other forms of outdoor recreation.

The Pender Islands Handbook is a 400-page traveler's reference published by Richard Fox. It includes information on hiking, biking, boating, the history of the islands, and includes a navigational map. The most recent version is the 10th Anniversary Edition, published in 2016.

The Pender Post is the island's locally owned independent newspaper, which has been operating since 1971. The owner of another local news provider, Island Tides, went on sabbatical in the summer of 2017 and has not resumed publishing.

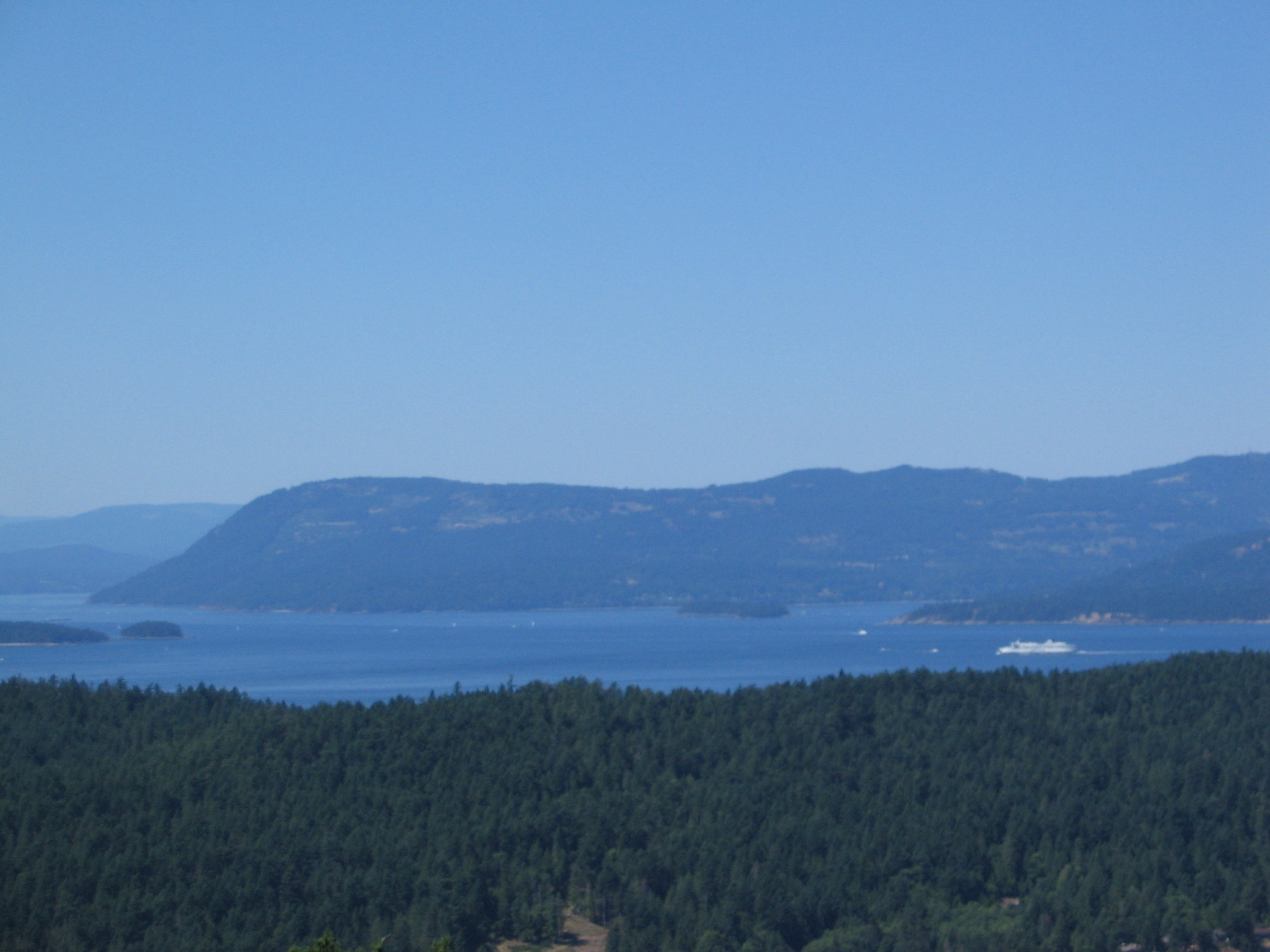
Mount Norman, viewed from Saltspring Island

The island has a 9-hole golf course. Several residents pooled their funds in 1937 to purchase a 60-acre (24 ha) parcel from George Grimmer, a son of Pender pioneer Washington Grimmer. These early investors planned and developed the layout of the golf course, which has operated ever since with the exception of a brief hiatus during World War II.

There is also a 27-hole disc golf course called Golf Island Disc Park, which is close to Magic Lake. It was founded in 1980 and is now maintained through the efforts of volunteers and the Pender Islands Park Commission. The course hosts disc golf tournaments including the Pender Island Invitational.

Pender Island is also home to Canada's first olive grove, called Waterlea Farm. 100 trees were originally planted by owner Andrew Butt with the goal of producing the first "Made in Canada" olive oil. As of December 2023 the property is for sale with 80+ trees listed as surviving.

=== Parks and beaches ===
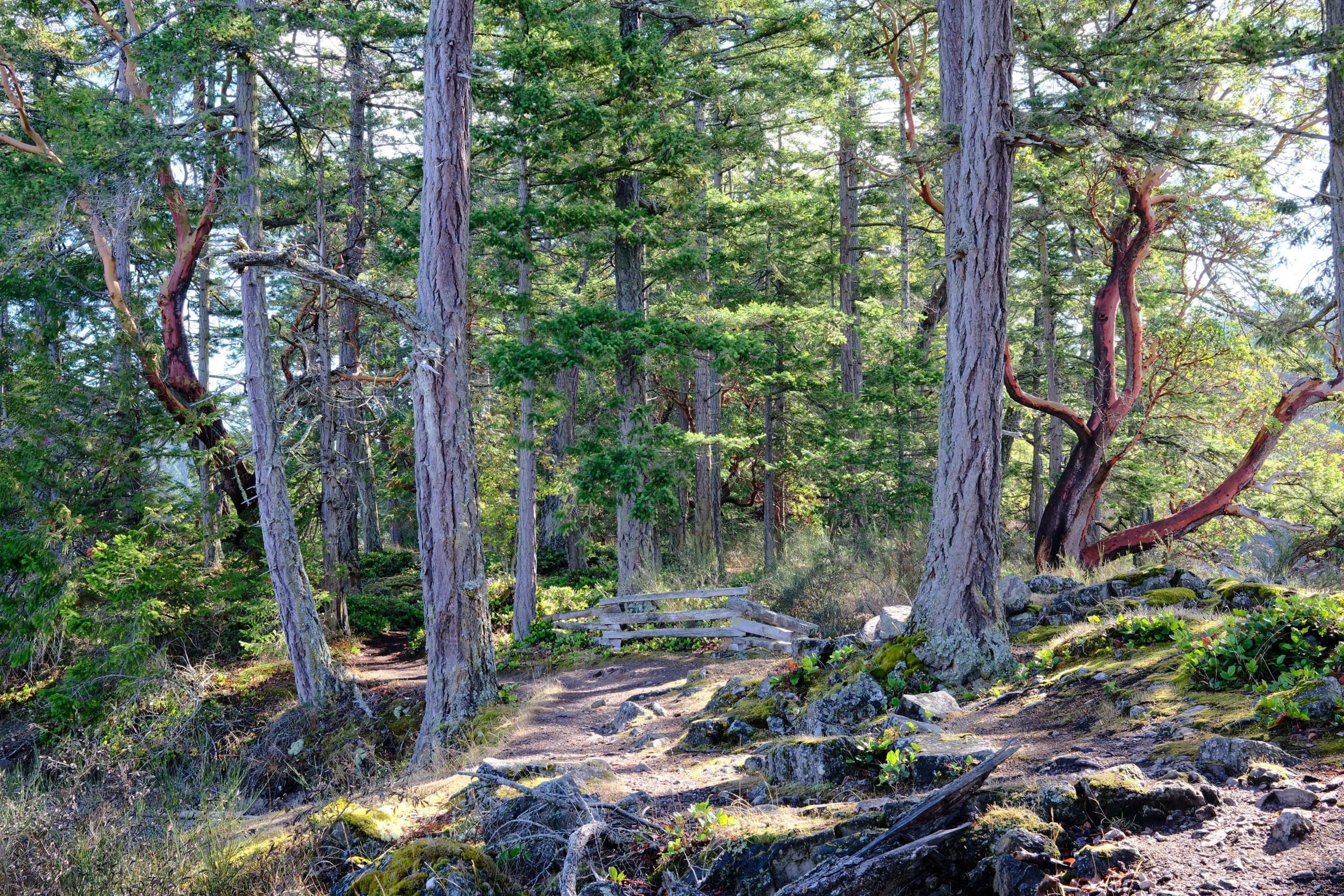
Trees on Roesland, a small islet on North Pender Island

Gulf Islands National Park Reserve has opportunities for boating, kayaking, hiking, camping and wildlife viewing. A difficult 1.5 km (0.9 mi) trail at Beaumont leads from the Ainslie Point parking lot to the shoreline via steep switchbacks that cut through dense temperate rainforest. The difficult 1.5 km (0.9 mi) trail at Mt. Norman ascends 244 m (801 ft) to a panoramic look-out with views of the San Juan Islands. The moderate 1.5 km (0.9 mi) trail at Roe Lake meanders through the Shingle Bay uplands to one of the Southern Gulf Island's few freshwater lakes. At Roesland, a small islet with Arbutus trees and views of the Salish Sea, visitors can explore a historic 1908 farmhouse which has been restored by members of the Pender Islands Museum Society.

=== Camping ===
Gulf Islands National Park Reserve has two options for campers on North Pender at this time: The drive-in, frontcountry sites at Prior Centennial Campground or the walk-in (or kayak-in) backcountry sites at Shingle Bay. Prior Centennial has 17 reservable sites and amenities include potable water, pit toilets, picnic tables and fire pits (seasonally available). Shingle Bay campground in the Roe Lake portion of the Reserve has 10 reservable primitive campsites with picnic tables and a pit toilet but no potable water. The walk/boat in sites at Beaumont on South Pender are closed for overnight camping until further notice as of summer 2022. Beaumont has 11 sites, and amenities include pit toilets and 15 mooring buoys for boaters, which remain open. There is no potable water at Beaumont and no campfires are permitted, regardless of season.

Private camping is available at Port Browning Marina. The sites are drive-in and frontcountry. Tents can be pitched anywhere on the large waterfront lawn of the marina. Small RV's are also welcome but there are no hookups or dump station.

== Transport ==
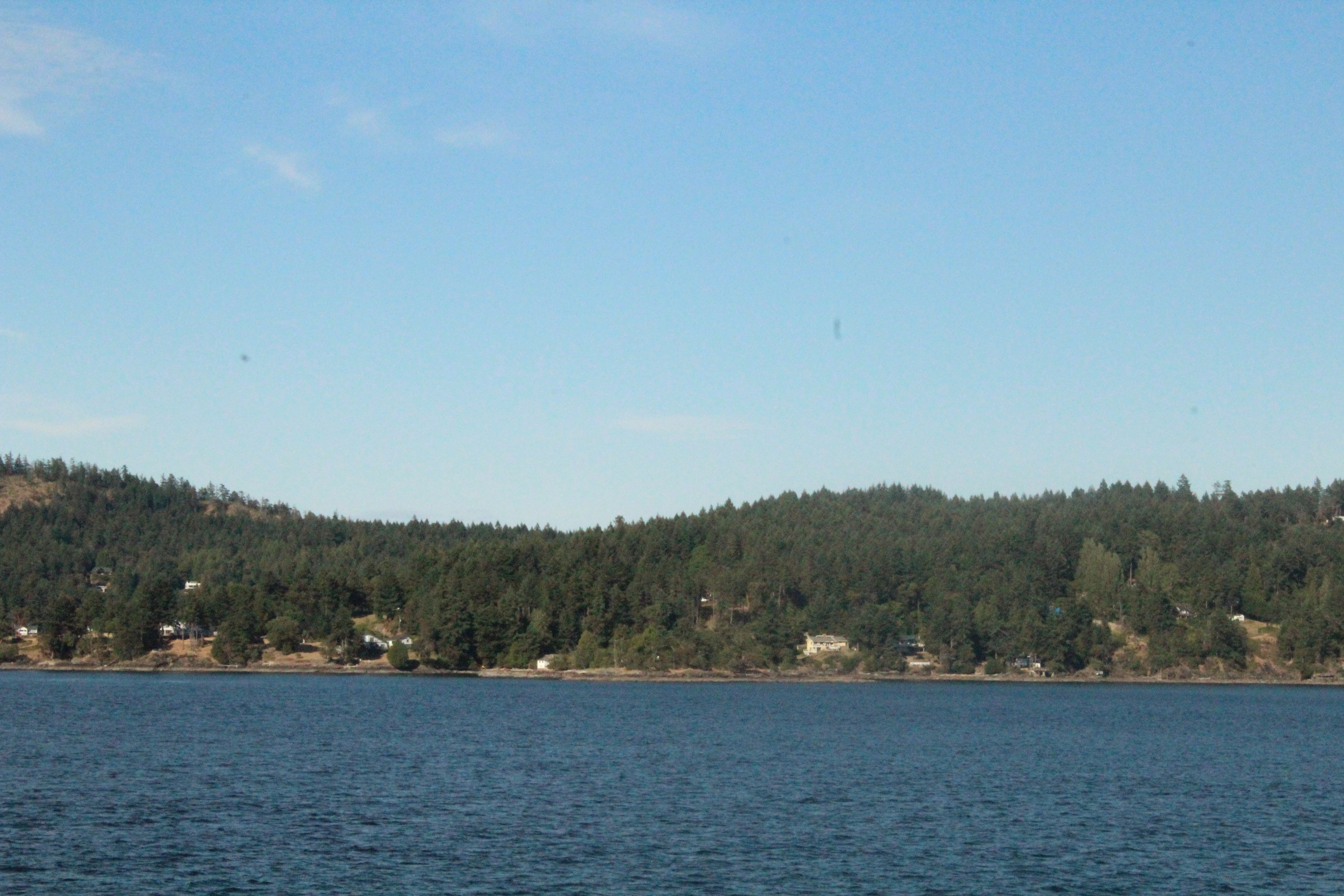
North Pender Island from the ferry

Pender Island can be accessed by regular ferry service provided by BC Ferries from Swartz Bay (near Victoria), Tsawwassen (near Vancouver), and other southern Gulf Islands, which dock in Otter Bay. There are also scheduled seaplane and water taxi services. On the Islands there is a system of "car stops," Pender Island's official alternative to hitch hiking. Conveniently located around the island you will find posts with maps, and often a handy chair.

Pender Island also has a helicopter pad located near the main shopping mall, the Driftwood Centre. Select helicopters can also land at Fire Hall #1. Bedwell Harbour is an official port of entry for sailors from the United States; Port Browning and Otter Bay also offer anchorages.

== Notable people ==
- Nicole Coenen
- Mac DeMarco

== See also ==
- Gulf Islands
- Gulf Islands National Park Reserve
- Juan Carrasco
- Pender Island Invitational
- Olive production in Canada
