= 49th parallel north =

Circle of latitude

49th parallel north (interactive map)

The 49th parallel north is a circle of latitude that is 49° north of Earth's equator. It crosses Europe, Asia, the Pacific Ocean, North America, and the Atlantic Ocean.

The city of Paris is about 15 kilometres (9 miles) south of the 49th parallel and is the largest city between the 48th and 49th parallels. Its main airport, Charles de Gaulle Airport, lies on the 49th parallel.

Roughly 2,030 kilometres (1,260 miles) of the Canada–United States border was designated to follow the 49th parallel from British Columbia to Manitoba on the Canada side, and from Washington to Minnesota on the U.S. side, more specifically from the Strait of Georgia to the Lake of the Woods. This international border was specified in the Anglo-American Convention of 1818 and the Oregon Treaty of 1846, though survey markers placed in the 19th century cause the border to deviate from the 49th parallel by up to 810 metres (0.503 miles).

From a point on the ground at this latitude, the sun is above the horizon for 16 hours, 12 minutes during the summer solstice and 8 hours, 14 minutes during the winter solstice.

This latitude also roughly corresponds to the minimum latitude in which astronomical twilight can last all night near the summer solstice. All-night astronomical twilight lasts about from June 9 to July 2. At midnight on the summer solstice, the altitude of the sun is about −17.56°.

Slightly less than one-eighth of the Earth's surface is north of the 49th parallel.

== Around the world ==
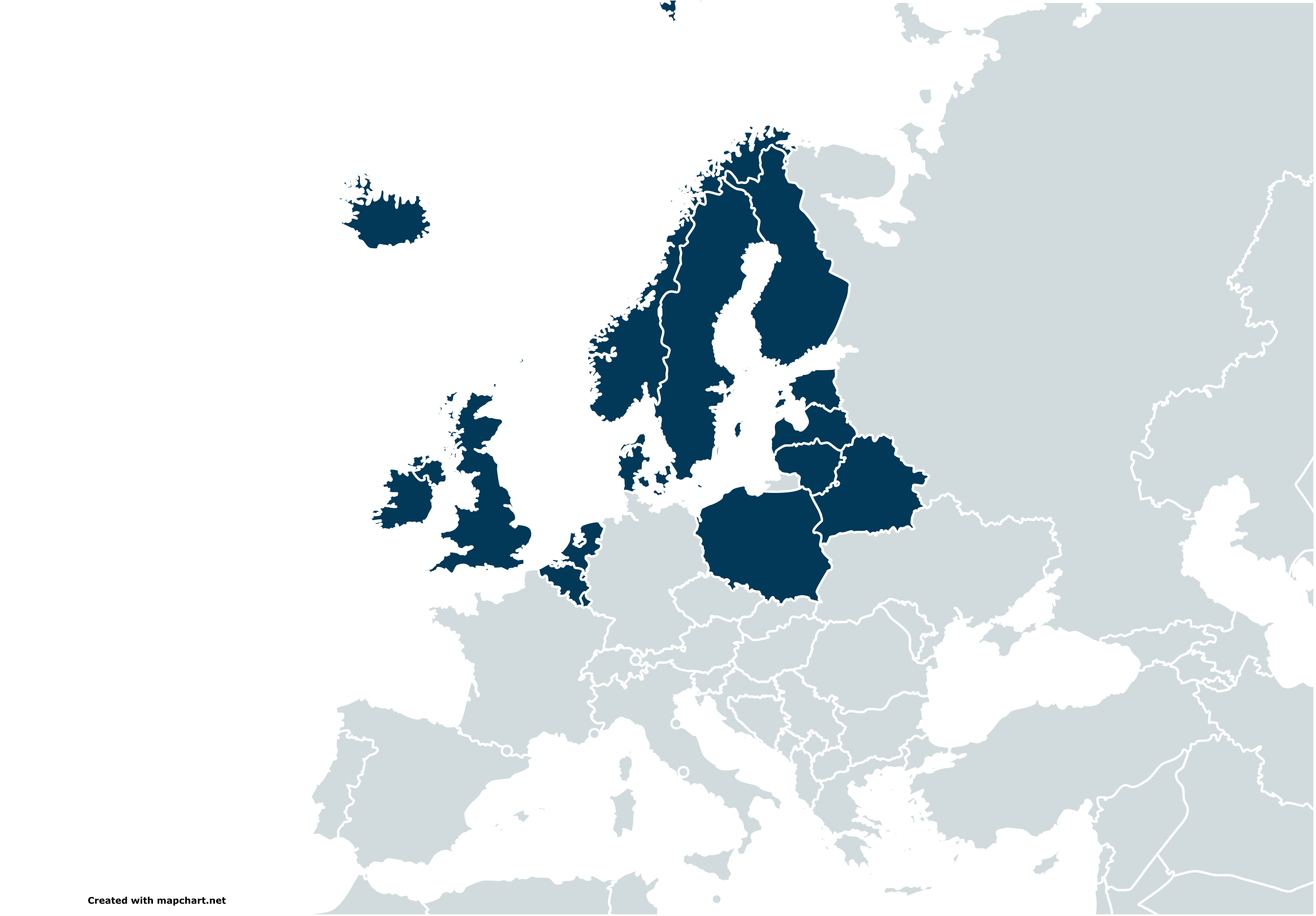
European countries entirely north of 49° N

Starting at the Prime Meridian and heading eastwards, the parallel 49° north passes through:

| Coordinates | Country, territory or sea | Notes |
|---|---|---|
| 49°0′N 0°0′E | France | Normandy; Île-de-France – crossing a runway of Charles de Gaulle Airport; Hauts-de-France; Grand Est |
| 49°0′N 8°4′E | Germany | Rhineland-Palatinate; Baden-Württemberg – passing through Karlsruhe; Bavaria – passing through Regensburg |
| 49°0′N 13°24′E | Czech Republic | Passing just north of České Budějovice |
| 49°0′N 15°0′E | Austria | For about 4.8 km (3 mi) |
| 49°0′N 15°4′E | Czech Republic | For about 5 km (3 mi) |
| 49°0′N 15°8′E | Austria | For about 110 m |
| 49°0′N 15°8′E | Czech Republic | |
| 49°0′N 17°57′E | Slovakia | Trenčín Region; Žilina Region; Prešov Region (passing through Prešov city centre) |
| 49°0′N 22°32′E | Ukraine | Zakarpattia Oblast; Lviv Oblast; Ivano-Frankivsk Oblast – passing through Bolekhiv and Kolomyia; Ternopil Oblast – passing just south of Chortkiv; Khmelnytskyi Oblast; Vinnytsia Oblast – passing just south of Zhmerynka; Cherkassy Oblast – passing through Shpola; Kirovohrad Oblast; Poltava Oblast – passing just through Kremenchuk and Horishni Plavni; Dnipropetrovsk Oblast; Kharkiv Oblast; Donetsk Oblast – passing just through Lyman; Luhanska Oblast – passing through Rubizhne |
| 49°0′N 39°42′E | Russia | Rostov Oblast; Volgograd Oblast |
| 49°0′N 46°55′E | Kazakhstan | |
| 49°0′N 86°44′E | China | Xinjiang |
| 49°0′N 87°55′E | Mongolia | |
| 49°0′N 116°8′E | China | Inner Mongolia; Heilongjiang |
| 49°0′N 130°0′E | Russia | Amur Oblast; Jewish Autonomous Oblast; Khabarovsk Krai |
| 49°0′N 140°21′E | Strait of Tartary | |
| 49°0′N 142°1′E | Russia | Island of Sakhalin |
| 49°0′N 142°57′E | Sea of Okhotsk | Gulf of Patience |
| 49°0′N 144°26′E | Russia | Island of Sakhalin |
| 49°0′N 144°27′E | Sea of Okhotsk | Passing between the islands of Kharimkotan and Ekarma in Russia's Kuril Island chain |
| 49°0′N 154°22′E | Pacific Ocean | |
| 49°0′N 125°41′W | Canada | British Columbia – Vancouver Island, Thetis Island and Galiano Island – passing through Ladysmith |
| 49°0′N 123°34′W | Strait of Georgia | |
| 49°0′N 123°5′W | United States | Washington (Point Roberts) |
| 49°0′N 123°2′W | Boundary Bay | Semiahmoo Bay |
| 49°0′N 122°45′W | United States | Washington |
| 49°0′N 121°56′W | Canada | British Columbia |
| 49°0′N 121°25′W | United States | Washington |
| 49°0′N 120°11′W | Canada | British Columbia |
| 49°0′N 119°49′W | United States | Washington |
| 49°0′N 117°18′W | Canada | British Columbia |
| 49°0′N 116°28′W | United States | Idaho, Montana |
| 49°0′N 115°21′W | Canada | British Columbia |
| 49°0′N 114°57′W | United States | Montana |
| 49°0′N 114°12′W | Canada | British Columbia, Alberta, Saskatchewan |
| 49°0′N 109°41′W | United States | Montana |
| 49°0′N 109°12′W | Canada | Saskatchewan |
| 49°0′N 107°22′W | United States | Montana |
| 49°0′N 106°55′W | Canada | Saskatchewan, Manitoba |
| 49°0′N 98°58′W | United States | North Dakota, Minnesota |
| 49°0′N 96°13′W | Canada | Manitoba |
| 49°0′N 95°17′W | Lake of the Woods | Passing just south of Big Island and Bigsby Island, Ontario, Canada |
| 49°0′N 94°25′W | Canada | Ontario – passing just south of Nipigon; Quebec – passing through Girardville |
| 49°0′N 68°38′W | St. Lawrence River | |
| 49°0′N 66°58′W | Canada | Quebec – Gaspé Peninsula – passing through Les Méchins and Gaspé |
| 49°0′N 64°24′W | Gulf of St. Lawrence | Passing just south of Anticosti Island, Quebec, Canada |
| 49°0′N 58°31′W | Canada | Newfoundland and Labrador – island of Newfoundland – passing through Pasadena and Bishop's Falls |
| 49°0′N 53°44′W | Atlantic Ocean | |
| 49°0′N 5°38′W | English Channel | Gulf of Saint-Malo – passing just south of the island of Jersey |
| 49°0′N 1°33′W | France | Normandy |

== Monuments on the parallel ==
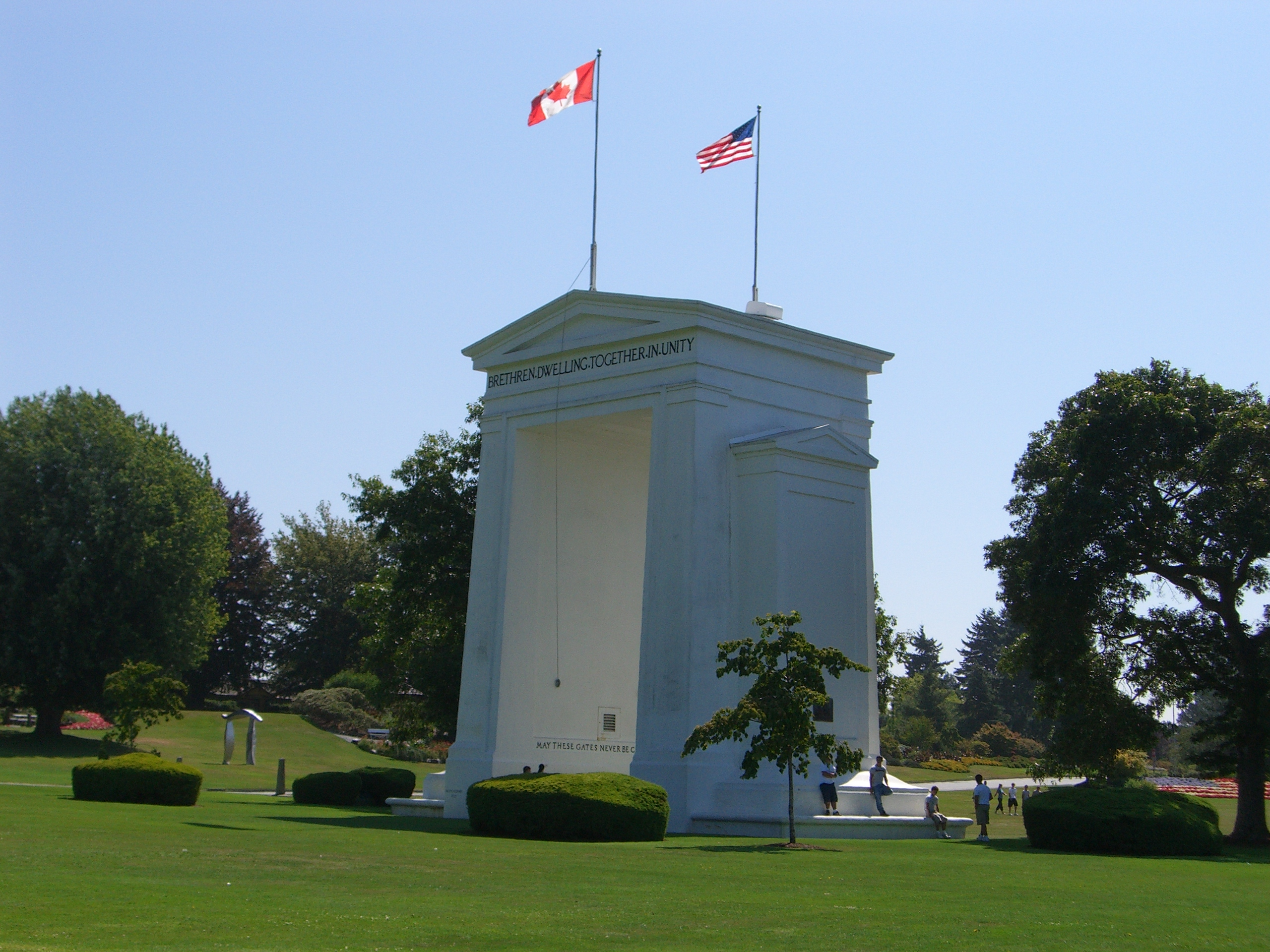
The Peace Arch border

- In North America, the westernmost monument on the 49th parallel is the Point Roberts Boundary Monument near the corner of Marine Drive and Roosevelt Way in the Point Roberts, Washington exclave south of Delta, British Columbia.
- The Peace Arch is a large monument between Surrey, British Columbia, and Blaine, Washington. It is the centerpiece of Peace Arch Park.
- Waterton-Glacier International Peace Park in Alberta and Montana
- The International Peace Garden is located at the border between Manitoba and North Dakota, about midway between the nearby communities of Boissevain, Manitoba and Dunseith, North Dakota. Until its demolition in 2017, the Peace Tower stood at the focal point of the garden, on the border. As of 2018, a new tower is slated to be constructed on the spot.
- The Stadtgarten in Karlsruhe, Germany, marks the 49th parallel with a stone and painted line.
- Monument in the northern part of town centre, Prešov, Slovakia.
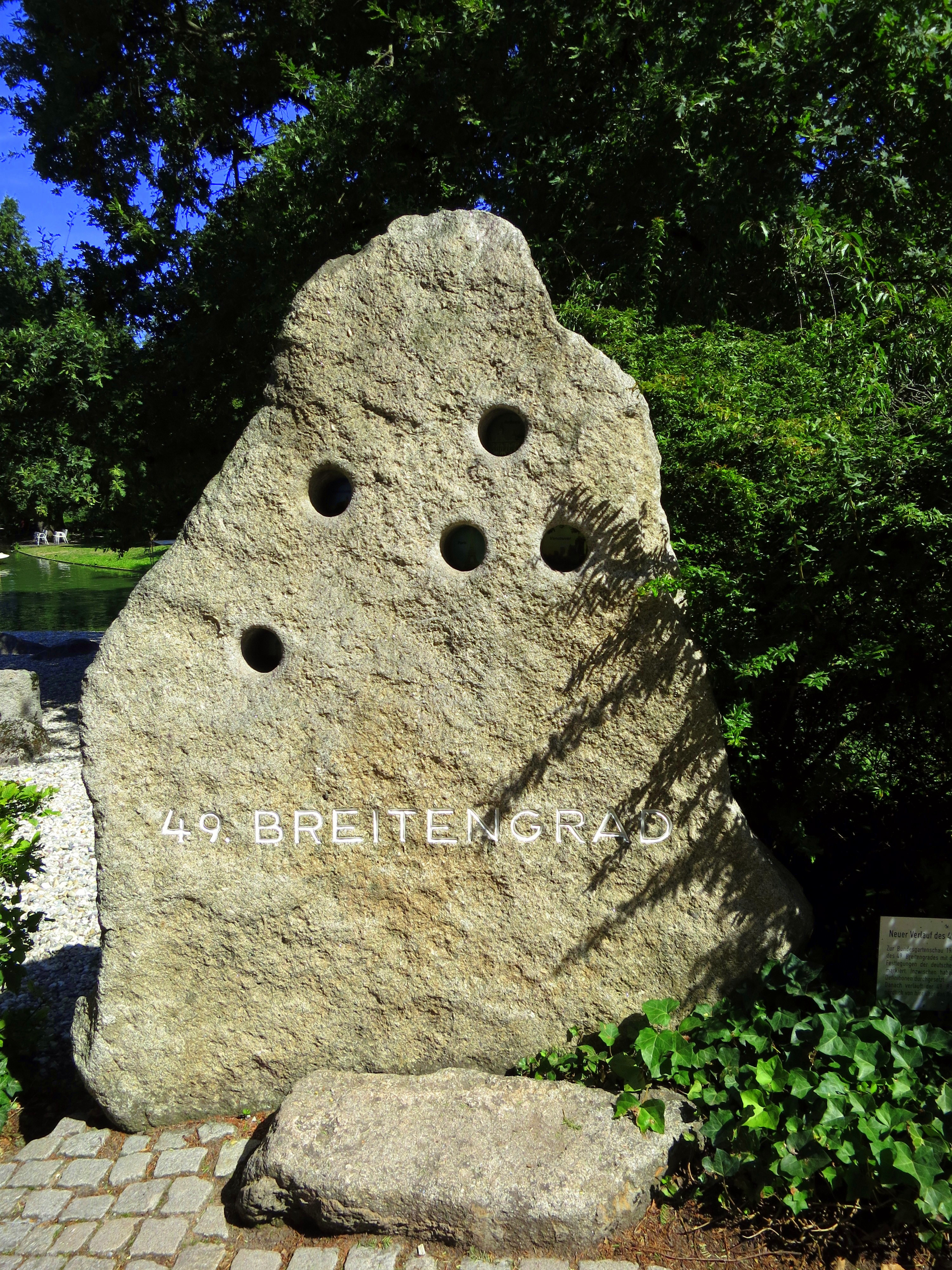
49th parallel north in Karlsruhe

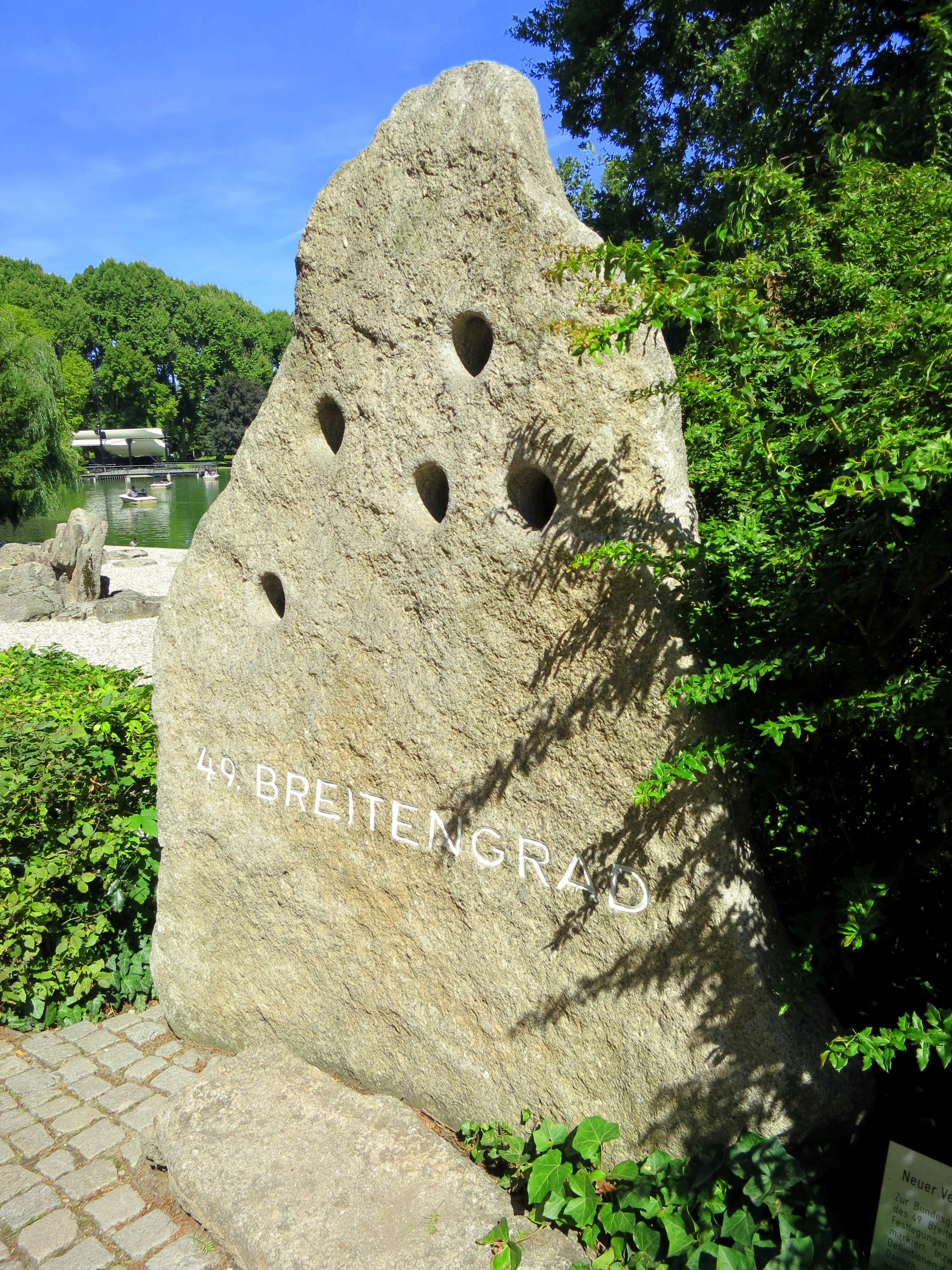
49th parallel north in Karlsruhe

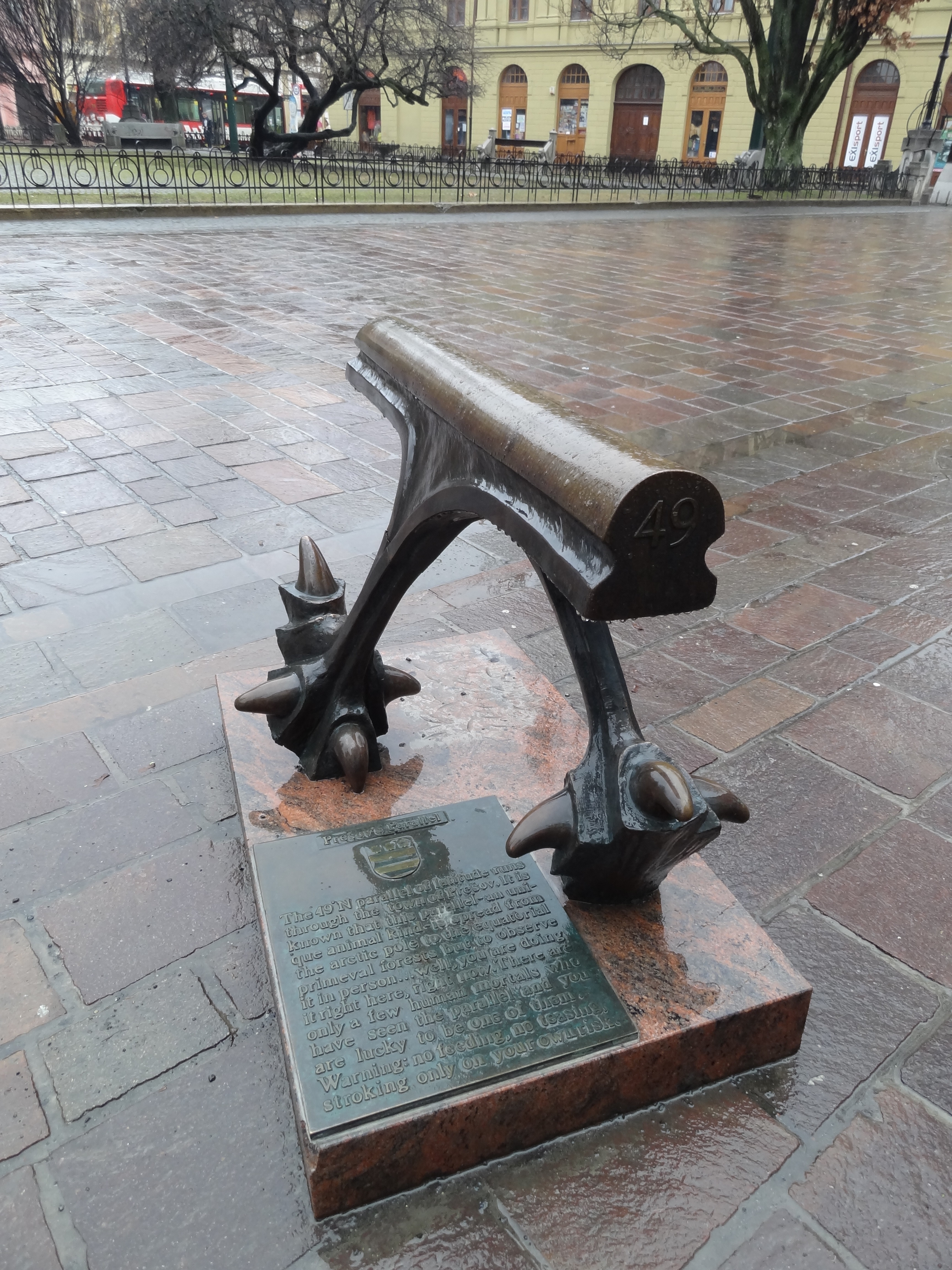
Monument marking the 49th parallel in Prešov

== Canada–United States border ==
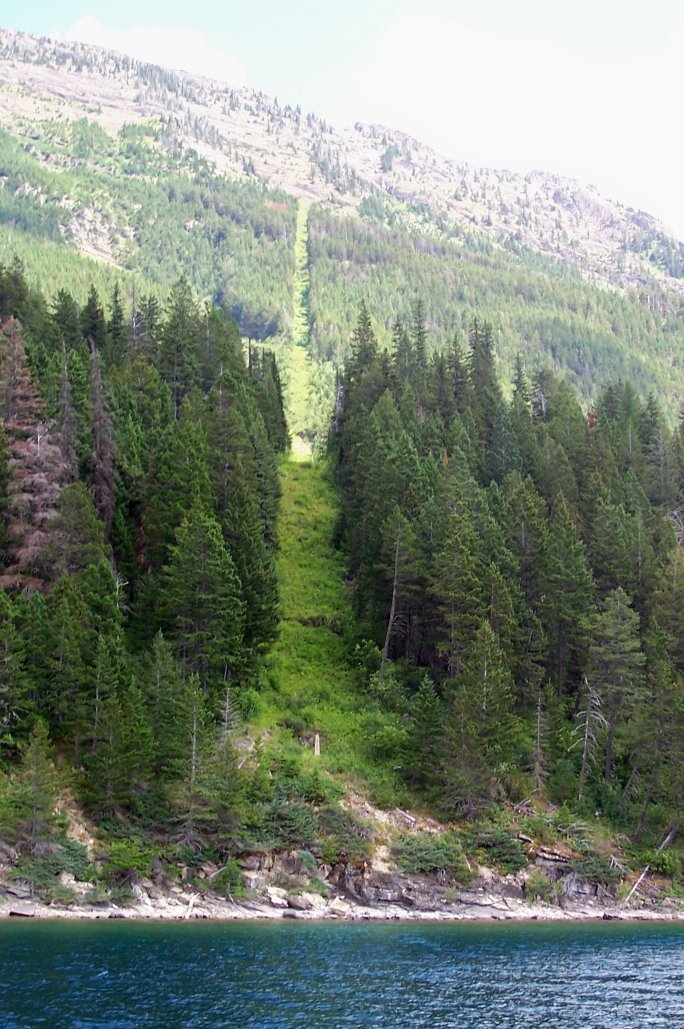
49th parallel at Waterton Lake, showing the cleared strip of land along the U.S./Canada border

=== History ===
In 1714, the Hudson's Bay Company proposed the 49th parallel as the western portion of the boundary between the company's land and French territory. At the time, Britain and France had agreed, in the Peace of Utrecht, to negotiate a boundary, but negotiations ultimately failed.

Following the Louisiana Purchase by the United States in 1803, it was generally agreed that the boundary between the new territory and British North America was along the watershed between the Missouri River and Mississippi River basins on one side and the Hudson Bay basin on the other. However, it is often difficult to precisely determine the location of a watershed in a region of level plains, such as in central North America. The British and American committees that met after the War of 1812 to resolve boundary disputes recognized there would be much animosity in surveying the watershed boundary, and agreed on a simpler border solution in the Treaty of 1818: the 49th parallel. Both sides gained and lost some territory by this convention, but the United States gained more than it lost, in particular securing title to the Red River Basin. This treaty established the boundary only between the line of longitude of the northwesternmost point of Lake of the Woods, on the east, and the Rocky Mountains, on the west. West of the Rockies, the treaty established joint occupation of the Oregon Country by both parties; east of Lake of the Woods, the boundary established in the Treaty of Paris would be retained.

Although the Convention of 1818 settled the boundary, neither country was immediately able to take control over the territories on its side of the line; effective control still rested with local First Nations peoples, mainly the Métis, Assiniboine, Lakota, and Blackfoot. Their power was gradually ceded by conquest and treaty during the several decades that followed. Among these peoples, the 49th parallel was nicknamed the Medicine Line because of its seemingly magical ability to prevent U.S. soldiers from crossing it.

In the 1844 U.S. presidential election, the Democratic Party asserted that the northern border of the Oregon Territory should be 54°40′, later reflected in the 1846 slogan "Fifty-Four Forty or Fight!" However, the Oregon boundary dispute was settled diplomatically in the 1846 Oregon Treaty. This agreement divided the Oregon Country between British North America and the United States by extending the 49th parallel boundary to the west coast, ending in the Strait of Georgia; it then circumvents Vancouver Island through Boundary Pass, Haro Strait, and the Strait of Juan de Fuca. This had the side effect of isolating Point Roberts, Washington.

=== As border ===
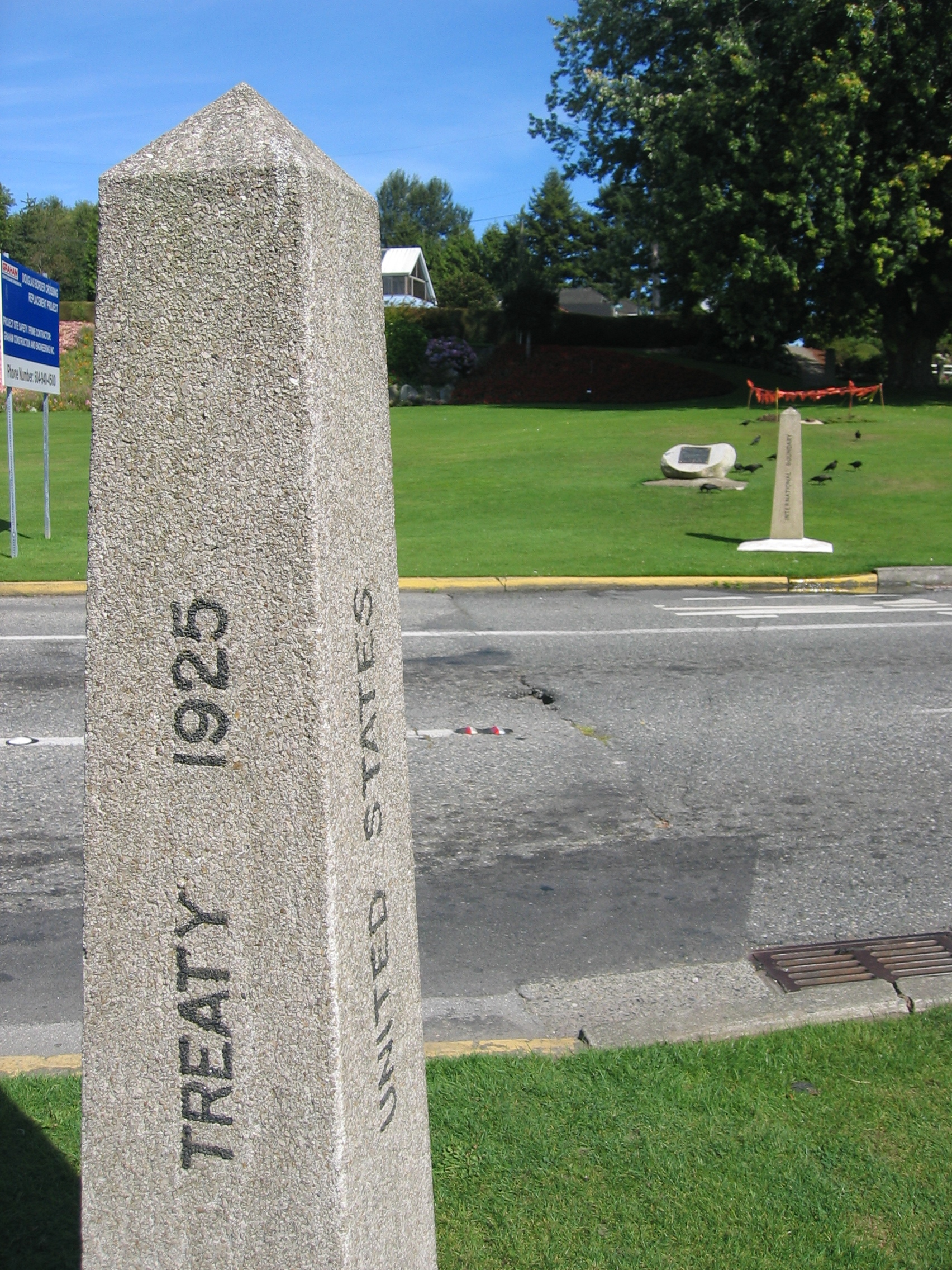
A typical boundary marker, one of many along the 49th parallel. This one divides Blaine, Washington from Surrey, British Columbia.

The 49th parallel north as a border between the Canadian provinces of British Columbia, Alberta, Saskatchewan and Manitoba (to the north), and the U.S. states of Washington, Idaho, Montana, North Dakota and Minnesota (to the south).

Although parts of Vancouver Island and parts of Eastern Canada are south of the 49th parallel, and parts of the United States (Alaska, Northwest Angle) are north of it, the term 49th parallel is sometimes used metonymically to refer to the entire Canada–U.S. border. Actually, many of Canada's most populated regions (and about 72% of the population) are south of the 49th parallel, including the two largest cities Toronto (43°42′ north) and Montreal (45°30′ north). The federal capital Ottawa (45°25′ north), and the provincial capital of seven provinces (Ontario, Quebec, New Brunswick, Prince Edward Island, Nova Scotia, Newfoundland and Labrador, and British Columbia) are south of the 49th parallel. Three provinces, New Brunswick, Prince Edward Island, and Nova Scotia, are each entirely south of the parallel, but the vast majority of Canadian territory lies north of it.

Parts of the 49th parallel were originally surveyed using astronomical techniques that did not take into account slight departures of the Earth's shape from a simple ellipsoid, or the deflection of the plumb-bob by differences in terrestrial mass. The surveys were subject to the limitations of early to mid-19th century technology; consequently, in some places the surveyed border is several hundred feet from the geographical 49th parallel for the currently adopted datum, the North American Datum of 1983 (NAD 83). The Digital Chart of the World (DCW), which uses the Clarke 1866 ellipsoid, reports the border on average at latitude 48° 59′ 51″ north, roughly 270 metres (886 ft) south of the modern 49th parallel. It ranges between 48° 59′ 25″ and 49° 0′ 10″ north, 810 metres (2,657 ft) and 590 metres (1,936 ft) on either side of the average. In any case, the Earth's North Pole moves around slightly, notionally moving the 49th and other parallels with it; see polar motion.

The Northwest Angle is the only part of the contiguous 48 states that goes north of the 49th parallel as surveyed. The Treaty of Paris called for the boundary between the US and British territory to pass through the most northwesterly point of Lake of the Woods, and this was retained even after an 1818 treaty set the boundary west of that point to follow the 49th parallel.

At the time that the United States and Great Britain agreed on the 49th parallel as the boundary, much of the North American continent had not yet been mapped. After the boundary was established, British surveyors discovered that Point Roberts lay south of the 49th parallel. The British requested that the United States cede the territory to Great Britain, but no action was ever taken.

In 1909 the United States, United Kingdom, and Canada signed and ratified a treaty confirming the original survey lines as the official and permanent international border. Nevertheless, in 2002 the difference of the survey from the geographical 49th parallel was argued in front of the Washington Supreme Court in the case of State of Washington v. Norman, under the premise that Washington did not properly incorporate the portions of land north of the geographical 49th parallel, as laid out by detailed GPS surveying. The court decided against the premise, ruling that the internationally surveyed boundary also served as the state boundary, regardless of its actual position.

== Ordnance Survey of Great Britain ==
The British national grid reference system uses the point 49° N, 2° W as its true origin. 49°00′00″N 2°00′00″W

== See also ==
- 48th parallel north
- 49th Parallel, 1941 Canadian and British film
- Hymns of the 49th Parallel, 2004 album by k.d. lang
- 50th parallel north
- Boundary Lake (Manitoba/North Dakota)
- Northwest Angle (northern Lake of the Woods County)
- Oregon boundary dispute
- Pig War, 1859
- War of 1812
- Weißwurstäquator
