= San Juan Islands National Monument =

National monument in Washington, United States

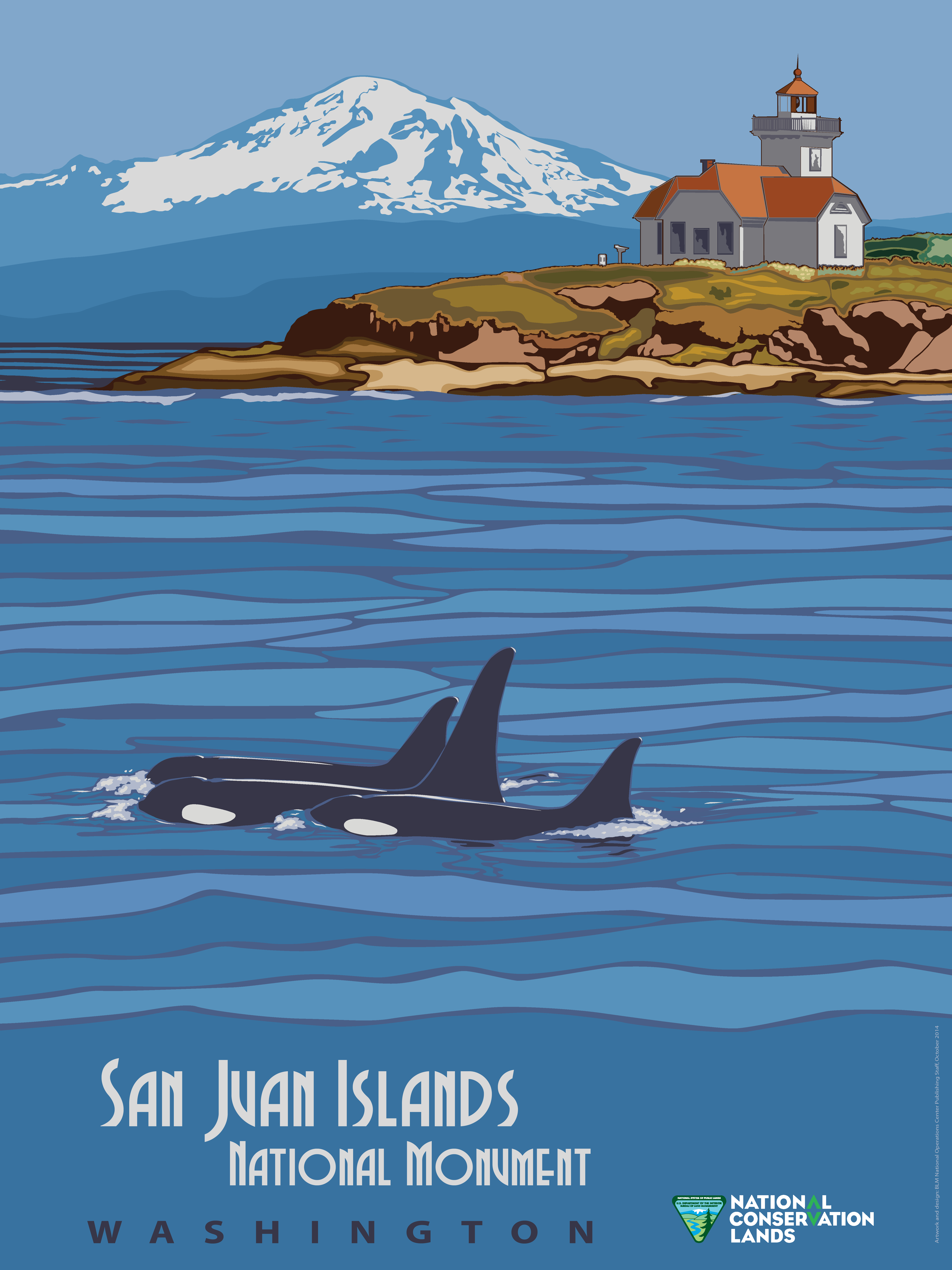

- Location within Washington (state) Location within the United States
- Location: San Juan, Whatcom, and Skagit Counties, Washington, USA
- Nearest city: Friday Harbor, WA
- Coordinates: 48°31′55″N 123°1′45″W
- Area: 1,000 acres (400 ha)
- Created: March 25, 2013
- Governing body: Bureau of Land Management
- Website: San Juan Islands National Monument

U.S. National Monument

San Juan Islands National Monument is a U.S. National Monument located in the Salish Sea in the state of Washington. The monument protects archaeological sites of the Coast Salish peoples, lighthouses and relics of early European American settlers in the Pacific Northwest, and biodiversity of the island life in the region. The monument was created from existing federal land by President Barack Obama on March 25, 2013 under the Antiquities Act.

== Geography ==
The national monument consists of approximately 75 separate sites totaling roughly 1,000 acres (4 km^{2}) in area. They are managed by the U.S. Bureau of Land Management as part of the National Landscape Conservation System.

Name	Major island vicinity	County	Location/GPS Coordinates	Notes
Leo Reef	Lopez Island	San Juan	48°33.19′N 122°51.25′W	
Fauntleroy Rock	Decatur Island	San Juan	48°31′04″N 122°47′44″W	
Dot Rock	Decatur Island	San Juan	48°29.66′N 122°47.73′W	
Reeds Bay Island	Decatur Island	San Juan	48°29′03″N 122°49′20″W	
Cape St. Mary	Lopez Island	San Juan	48.446967°N 122.80026°W	
Chadwick Hill	Lopez Island	San Juan	48.435864°N 122.810369°W	
Watmough Bay	Lopez Island	San Juan	48.42653°N 122.81436°W	
Point Colville	Lopez Island	San Juan	48.421967°N 122.813888°W	
Iceberg Point	Lopez Island	San Juan	48.421227°N 122.88929°W	
Iceberg Point Rocks	Lopez Island	San Juan	48°25′28.751″N 122°53′12.45″W	
Outer Bay Rocks	Lopez Island	San Juan	48°25′56.46″N 122°53′0.89″W 48°25′51.37″N 122°52′57.69″W	
Mackaye Harbor Rocks	Lopez Island	San Juan	48°26′24.32″N 122°52′41.10″W	
Jones Bay Rock	Lopez Island	San Juan	48.445629°N 122.891833°W	
Richardson Island	Lopez Island	San Juan	48°26′50.16″N 122°54′12.14″W	
Richardson Rocks	Lopez Island	San Juan	48°26′42.01″N 122°54′25.66″W 48°26′41.32″N 122°54′22.55″W 48°26′50.16″N 122°54′12.14″W 48°26′42.01″N 122°54′25.66″W 48°26′41.32″N 122°54′22.55″W	
Davis Bay Island	Lopez Island	San Juan	48°27′30.50″N 122°55′48.35″W	
Davis Bay Rocks	Lopez Island	San Juan	48°27′18.75″N 122°56′5.74″W	
Danger Rocks	San Juan Island	San Juan	48°31′15.59″N 122°58′16.86″W 48°31′14.09″N 122°58′15.78″W	
Pear Point Rocks	San Juan Island	San Juan	48°31′5.14″N 122°58′45.18″W 48°31′4.22″N 122°58′40.66″W 48°31′4.88″N 122°58′38.79″W	
Dinner Island Rocks	San Juan Island	San Juan	48°30′29″N 123°0′42″W	
Cattle Point	San Juan Island	San Juan	48°27′3.43″N 122°57′48.72″W	Includes Cattle Point Light
Unnamed Rocks (Grandmas Cove)	San Juan Island	San Juan	48°27′30″N 123°01′27″W	
Unnamed Rocks (False Bay)	San Juan Island	San Juan	48°28′53″N 123°04′42″W	
Kanaka Bay Islands	San Juan Island	San Juan	48°28′57.79″N 123°5′6.87″W 48°28′56.41″N 123°5′15.51″W	
King Islands	San Juan Island	San Juan	48°29′23″N 123°06′27″W	
Unnamed Rocks off Lime Kiln Point	San Juan Island	San Juan	48°30′57.47″N 123°9′10.50″W	
Turn Point	Stuart Island	San Juan	48.68877°N 123.23725°W	Includes Turn Point Light
Prevost Harbor Rock	Stuart Island	San Juan	48°40′53.34″N 123°11′53.104″W 48°40′48.08″N 123°12′10.64″W	
Pudding Island	Stuart Island	San Juan	48°41′7.49″N 123°11′25.43″W	
Satellite Island Rocks	Stuart Island	San Juan	48°40′39.70″N 123°11′5.706″W 48°40′36.94″N 123°11′12.008″W 48°40′35.458″N 123°11′5.098″W 48°40′38.472″N 123°10′59.289″W	
Rock Island and Johns Pass Rocks	Stuart Island	San Juan	48°40′23.007″N 123°10′5.77″W 48°40′32.09″N 123°10′0.48″W	
Unnamed Parcel (Johns Island)	Stuart Island	San Juan	48°40.0′N 123°8.9′W	
Johns Island Rock	Stuart Island	San Juan	48°39′27.371″N 123°8′14.867″W	
Posey Island	San Juan Island	San Juan	48°37′6.23″N 123°10′4.31″W	
Unnamed Island (Westcott Bay)	San Juan Island	San Juan	48°36′16″N 123°08′46″W	
Kellett Bluff	Henry Island	San Juan	48.58861°N 123.2021°W	
Mitchell Bay Rocks (AKA Mud Rocks)	San Juan Island	San Juan	48°34′21.53″N 123°10′12.55″W 48°34′19.57″N 123°10′11.85″W 48°34′20.74″N 123°10′15.01″W	
Mud Island	San Juan Island	San Juan	48°34′19.31″N 123°9′25.69″W	
Little Patos Island	Patos Island	San Juan	48°47′2.88″N 122°58′6.95″W	
Patos Island	Patos Island	San Juan	48°47′1.66″N 122°57′17.67″W	Includes Patos Island Light
Shallow Bay Rocks	Sucia Island	San Juan	48°45′49.42″N 122°55′8.25″W 48°45′48.61″N 122°55′9.34″W	
Rolfe Cove Island	Matia Island	San Juan	48°44′59.43″N 122°50′41.99″W 48°44′57.84″N 122°50′38.18″W	
Barnes Rocks	Clark Island	San Juan	48°42′15.30″N 122°46′30.45″W 48°42′11.45″N 122°46′31.85″W 48°42′11.05″N 122°46′25.34″W	
Clark Rocks	Clark Island	San Juan	48°42′31″N 122°45′58″W	
Indian Island	Orcas Island	San Juan	48°41′32.97″N 122°54′29.49″W	
Point Doughty Rock	Orcas Island	San Juan	48°42′43″N 122°57′02″W	
Beach Haven Rocks	Orcas Island	San Juan	48°41′27.178″N 122°57′42.787″W 48°41′27.174″N 122°57′31.046″W	
Freeman Island	Orcas Island	San Juan	48°41′55.185″N 122°57′3.295″W	
Blind Islands	Orcas Island	San Juan	48°37′44.83″N 122°52′40.52″W 48°37′30.00″N 122°52′36.02″W	
Twin Rocks	Orcas Island	San Juan	48°36′56.45″N 122°52′0.347″W 48°36′55.99″N 122°51′54.23″W	
Unnamed Island (Guthrie Cove)	Orcas Island	San Juan	48°35′38.79″N 122°53′9.28″W	
Foster Point Rocks	Orcas Island	San Juan	48°35′21.67″N 122°53′4.99″W	
Elwha Rock	Orcas Island	San Juan	48°35′36.639″N 122°54′15.16″W	
Picnic Point Rocks	Shaw Island	San Juan	48°33′45.10″N 122°55′19.24″W	Does not include privately owned Picnic Point Island
Cotton Point Island	Orcas Island	San Juan	48°35′37.50″N 122°56′12.74″W	One of the smallest BLM holdings in Washington, 0.25 acres (0.10 ha).
Blind Island	Shaw Island	San Juan	48°35′6.80″N 122°56′13.47″W	
Unnamed Island and Rocks (Blind Bay)	Shaw Island	San Juan	48°34′42.509″N 122°56′30.138″W	
Broken Point Island	Shaw Island	San Juan	48°35′32.71″N 122°58′12.29″W	
Oak Island and Rock	Orcas Island	San Juan	48°36′28.35″N 122°57′16.80″W 48°36′26.84″N 122°57′11.38″W	
Trinka Rock	Orcas Island	San Juan	48°37′42.75″N 122°57′28.56″W	
Skull Island	Orcas Island	San Juan	48°38′21.05″N 122°59′10.34″W	
Massacre Bay Rocks	Orcas Island	San Juan	48°38′2.18″N 122°59′31.93″W	
Harbor Rocks	Orcas Island	San Juan	48°37′48.00″N 122°59′10.34″W	
Victim Island	Orcas Island	San Juan	48°36′49.37″N 122°58′30.96″W	
Lovers' Cove Rocks	Orcas Island	San Juan	48°40′06″N 122°59′23″W	
North Pass Rock	Orcas Island	San Juan	48°36′08″N 123°01′00″W	
McConnell Rocks	Orcas Island	San Juan	48°35′57″N 123°01′32″W	
Parks Bay Island	Shaw Island	San Juan	48°33′58.19″N 122°59′04.79″W	
Reservation Bay Rocks - Coffin Rocks	Fidalgo Island	Skagit	48°24′47″N 122°39′46″W	
Reservation Bay Rocks - Urchin Rocks	Fidalgo Island	Skagit	48°25′01″N 122°39′58″W	
Reservation Bay Rocks - Gull Rocks (Bird Rocks)	Fidalgo Island	Skagit	48°24′53″N 122°39′37″W	
Chuckanut Rock		Whatcom	48°41′05″N 122°30′03″W	
Unnamed Rocks (Carter Point)	Lummi Island	Whatcom	48°38′23.76″N 122°36′29.07″W	
Bakers Reef	Lummi Island	Whatcom	48°41′01″N 122°40′42″W	
Lummi Rocks	Lummi Island	Whatcom	48°40′15″N 122°40′02″W	
Eliza Rocks	Eliza Island	Whatcom	48°38′57.74″N 122°35′32.32″W 48°38′48.15″N 122°34′42.09″W 48°39′39.36″N 122°35′14.14″W	
Tip of Eliza Island	Eliza Island	Whatcom	48°38′43″N 122°34′56″W	Unsurveyed section 5

== See also ==
- List of national monuments of the United States
