= Cattle Point Light =

Lighthouse in Washington, United States

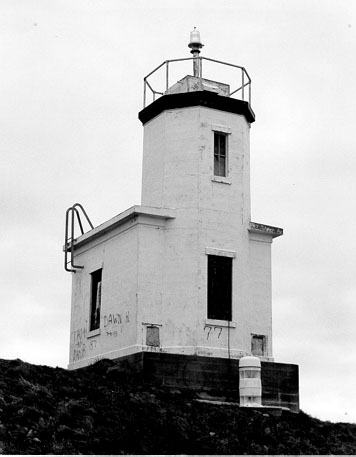
- Cattle Point Light after removal of its lantern
- Location: San Juan Island, Washington
- Coordinates: 48.4504°N 122.9635°W

Tower
- Constructed: 1888
- Foundation: Surface
- Construction: Concrete
- Height: 34 feet (10 m)
- Shape: Octagonal

Light
- First lit: 1888 (current tower 1935)
- Focal height: 29 m (95 ft)
- Lens: Fourth order Fresnel lens (removed)
- Range: 7 nmi (13 km; 8.1 mi)
- Characteristic: Fl W 4s

Cattle Point Lighthouse is a lighthouse on the southeastern tip of San Juan Island overlooking the Strait of Juan de Fuca where the Haro Straits meet the San Juan Channel, in San Juan County, Washington. The light lies adjacent to the state's Cattle Point Natural Resources Conservation Area and, since 2013, is part of the San Juan Islands National Monument.

== History ==
The first light at Cattle Point was a lens lantern on a post erected in 1888. In 1921, the U.S. Navy installed a radio compass station. The modern 34-foot (10 m), octagonal, concrete tower on Cattle Point was erected in 1935. Following automation in the late 1950s, the tower's lantern was removed and replaced with a 250-mm drum lens that sits on a short mast on top of the tower. The lighthouse received a temporary makeover in 1984, when it was used as a backdrop for an Exxon television commercial. The commercial's ahistorical additions were subsequently removed. The Coast Guard announced plans to reinforce the structure, which was in danger of collapse from the forces of erosion, during the summer of 2010.
