= Patos Island Light =

Patos Island Lighthouse
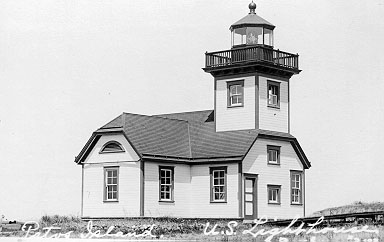
- Location: San Juan Islands, Washington
- Coordinates: 48.789°N 122.9715°W

Tower
- Foundation: Surface
- Construction: Wood
- Automated: 1974
- Height: 38 feet (12 m)
- Shape: Square
- Heritage: National Register of Historic Places listed place

Light
- First lit: 1908
- Focal height: 12 m (39 ft)
- Lens: Fourth order Fresnel lens
- Range: 9 nmi (17 km; 10 mi) (white), 6 nmi (11 km; 6.9 mi) (red)
- Characteristic: White light every 6 s; two red sectors marking dangerous shoals
- Patos Island Light Station
- U.S. National Register of Historic Places
- Nearest city: Eastsound, Washington
- Area: 1 acre
- Built: 1893
- Architectural style: Greek Revival-Victorian
- NRHP reference No.: 77001355
- Added to NRHP: October 21, 1977

Patos Island Lighthouse is an active aid to navigation overlooking the Strait of Georgia at Alden Point on the western tip of Patos Island in the San Juan Islands, San Juan County, Washington, in the United States. The station is the northernmost in the San Juan Islands and marks the division point between the eastern and western passages into the Strait of Juan de Fuca.

In 2013, Patos Island and its lighthouse were included in the US Presidential Proclamation by Barack Obama creating San Juan Islands National Monument, managed by the Bureau of Land Management, part of the US Department of Interior. Limited developments on the island are managed in partnership with Washington State Parks and volunteers with the nonprofit friends group Keeper of the Patos Light. On some maps it is also referred to as Patos Island State Park.

Access to Patos Island is challenging; no public ferry system serves the 200 acre island. Two offshore mooring buoys are available for private boats as permitted through the Washington State Parks. The volunteer organization Keepers of the Patos Light provides some public access to the lighthouse structure during summer months in partnership with the Washington State Parks and Bureau of Land Management, and have developed interpretive exhibits for the lighthouse through a Washington State Lighthouse Environmental Program (LEP) grant.

== History ==
Repeated shipwrecks in the area increased public demand for aids to navigation in Boundary Pass and the Georgia Strait. In 1888, the Canadian government completed construction of East Point Light on Saturna Island. On March 3, 1891, the United States Congress approved the appropriation of $12,000 for the construction of a fog signal station on Patos Island.

The original light station was a post light and third-class Daboll trumpet fog signal. Beginning operation on November 30, 1893, the light was used as a navigational aid to steamships traveling to ports around Georgia Strait such as Vancouver, and up the Inside Passage to Alaska.

The lighthouse was improved in 1908 with a new fog signal and a 38-foot (12 m) tower, which housed a fourth-order Fresnel lens. The light was automated in 1974. Today, it has a modern lens which flashes a white light once every six seconds and has two red sectors marking dangerous shoals off the island. The original fourth-order Fresnel lens is now in private ownership in Oregon.

In addition to the light and fog signals, Patos Island Light was part of a network of radio beacons that aided navigation in Puget Sound. A radio beacon was established on Patos Island in 1936, which broadcast the letter "K" in Morse code. Using radio direction finding, vessels at sea could combine information multiple beacons to triangulate their location.

The early years of the light were recorded in The Light on the Island, the childhood recollections of Helene Glidden, daughter of Edward Durgan, who was lighthouse keeper from 1905-1911.

Patos Island Lighthouse was listed on the U.S. National Register of Historic Places in 1977. Through federal funding from the U.S. Bureau of Land Management, the lighthouse was renovated in 2008 with a new roof, doors, windows, gutters and downspouts, and new paint inside and out. The lighthouse is the last remaining structure at this site; the U.S. Coast Guard demolished the original keepers' residence in 1958. Similar 1893 structures can be viewed at Turn Point Lighthouse, located on Stuart Island and also part of San Juan Islands National Monument.

== List of Lighthouse Keepers ==
The following individuals served as Keeper of the Patos Island Light under either the United States Lighthouse Service or the United States Coast Guard until the United States' entry into World War II.

| Name | Title | Dates of Service |
|---|---|---|
| Harry D. Mahler | Keeper | 1893 - 1903 |
| Albert A. Morgan | Keeper | 1903 - 1905 |
| Edward Durgan | Keeper | 1905 - 1911 |
| George L. Lonholt | Keeper | 1911 - 1922 |
| Hans F. Jensen | Keeper | 1922 - 1928 |
| Criss Curtis Waters | Keeper | 1928 - 1931 |
| Orlo E. Hayward | Keeper | 1931 - 1933 |
| Edmund N. Cadwell | Keeper | 1933 - unknown |
| Frank W. Dorrance | Keeper | 1938 - 1941 |
