= Patos Island =

Island of the San Juan islands in Washington, United States

Patos Island Marine State Park
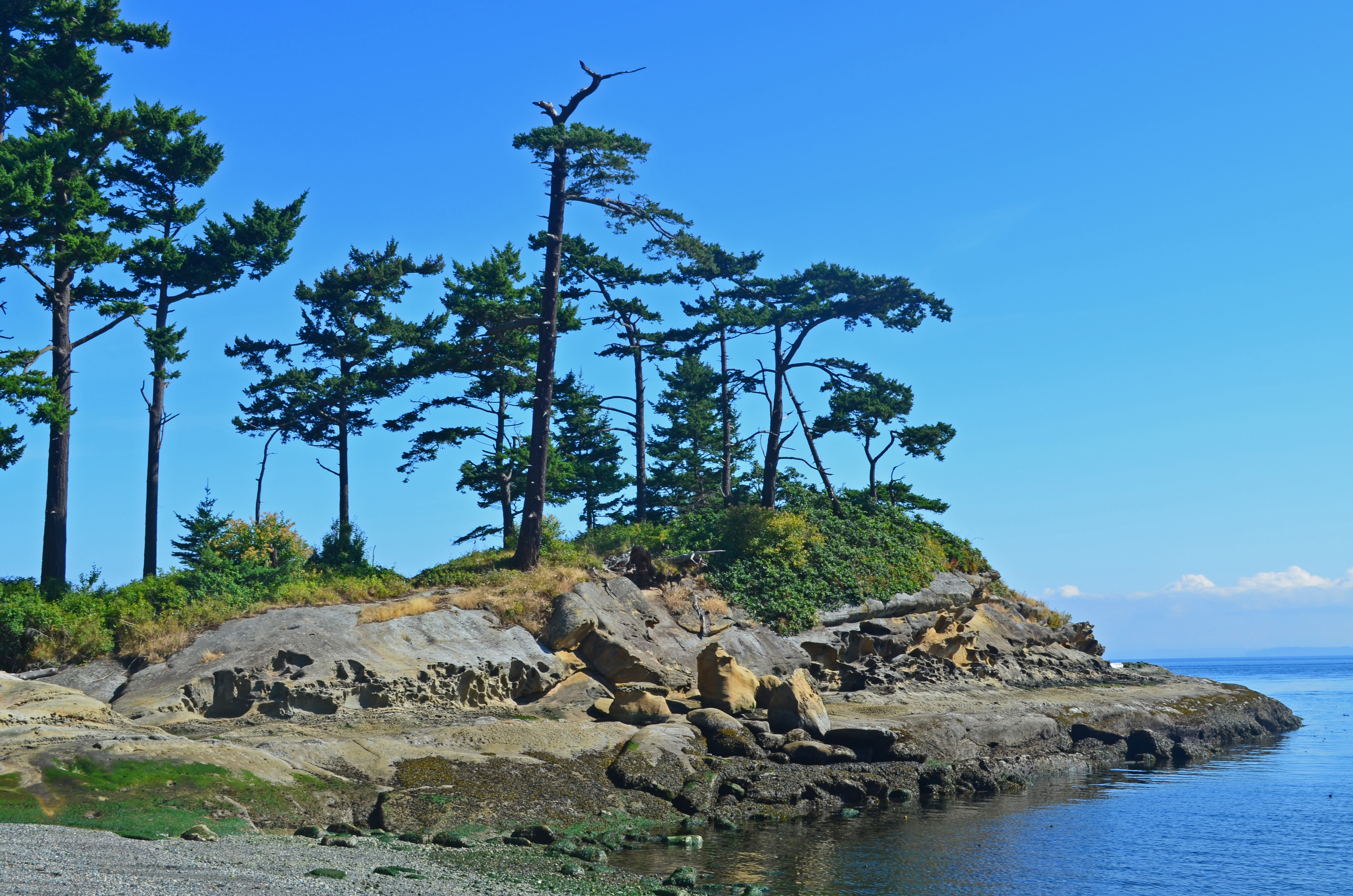
- Toe Point, Patos Island

- Location within Washington (state) Location within the United States
- Location: San Juan County, Washington, United States
- Coordinates: 48°47′04″N 122°57′16″W
- Area: 207 acres (84 ha)
- Elevation: 102 ft (31 m)
- Established: 1974
- Administrator: Washington State Parks and Recreation Commission
- Website: Official website

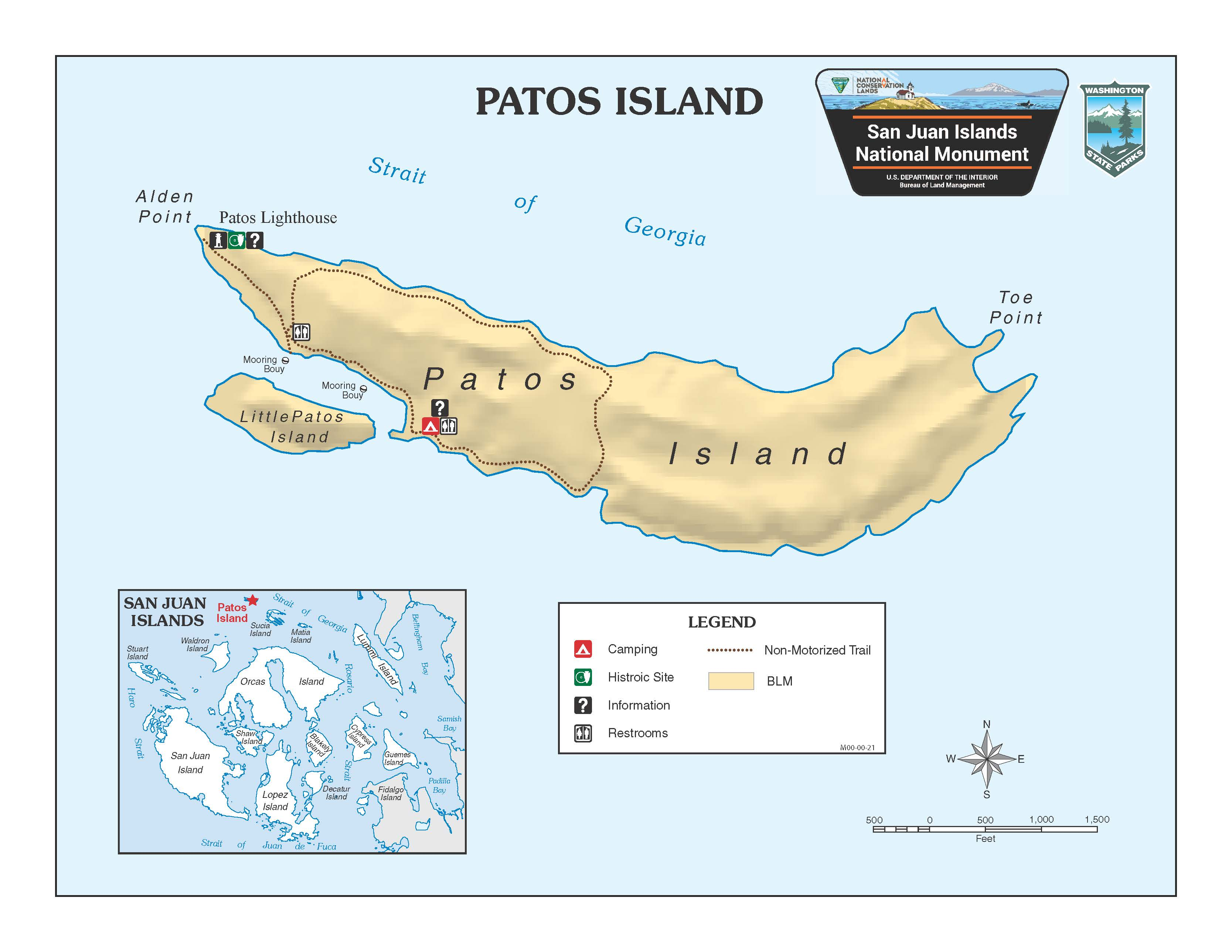
Map of Patos Island and Little Patos Island

Patos Island is the northernmost island of the San Juan Islands of the U.S. state of Washington. Since 1893, the small island has been home to the Patos Island Lighthouse, guiding vessels through Boundary Pass between Canada's Gulf Islands and the United States. It is the site of several border markers establishing the Canada–United States border on Haro Strait, following the settlement of disputes between 1859 and 1908. From 1939 to 1978, the island was owned and operated by the United States Coast Guard, with members manning both the lighthouse and the Coast Guard station full-time.

The island and adjacent islets comprise Patos Island Marine State Park, a 207-acre (0.84 km^{2}) marine park with 20,000 feet (6,100 m) of saltwater shoreline. The Washington State Parks and Recreation Commission began operating Patos Island as a state park under a lease agreement with the Bureau of Land Management in 1974. The entire island is owned by the federal government and is administered by the Bureau of Land Management's Wenatchee Office, which calls the island the "northwestern-most point" in the Lower 48. The Washington State Parks and Recreation Commission operates a small campground facility at Active Cove near the west side of the island, maintains a 1.5-mile (2.4 km) loop trail, and has two offshore mooring buoys.

== Geology ==
The bedrock outcrops of Patos Island are made up of rock that formed from hardened sediment which was deposited about 50 million years ago, during the Eocene. The sediments were left behind by a river that carried minerals and rocks from eastern Washington, prior to the formation of the Cascade Mountains. The climate along this river was tropical, with the presence of forests indicated by fossilized wood typical of the Chuckanut Formation. Strata found on Patos Island, including sandstone from the Nanaimo Group, make up a significant component of the geologic evidence for the presence of an Upper Cretaceous river delta in the San Juan Island formation. The partial leg of a fossil therapod found in the Nanaimo Group rocks on the neighboring Sucia Island, referred to as Suciasaurus, suggests the presence of dinosaurs in the Late Cretaceous period. While much of the shale from these geologic processes has eroded, the more resistant sandstone and conglomerate forms the basis of the island's ridge lines. The island has a varied terrain, with forested rolling hills, rock and sand beaches, and flat, rocky ledges.

Off the southwestern shore of Patos Island, separated by 50 feet (15 m) of water, there is a smaller 15 acres (6.1 ha) island called Little Patos Island. The sheer cliff faces and densely forested surface make this smaller island inaccessible.

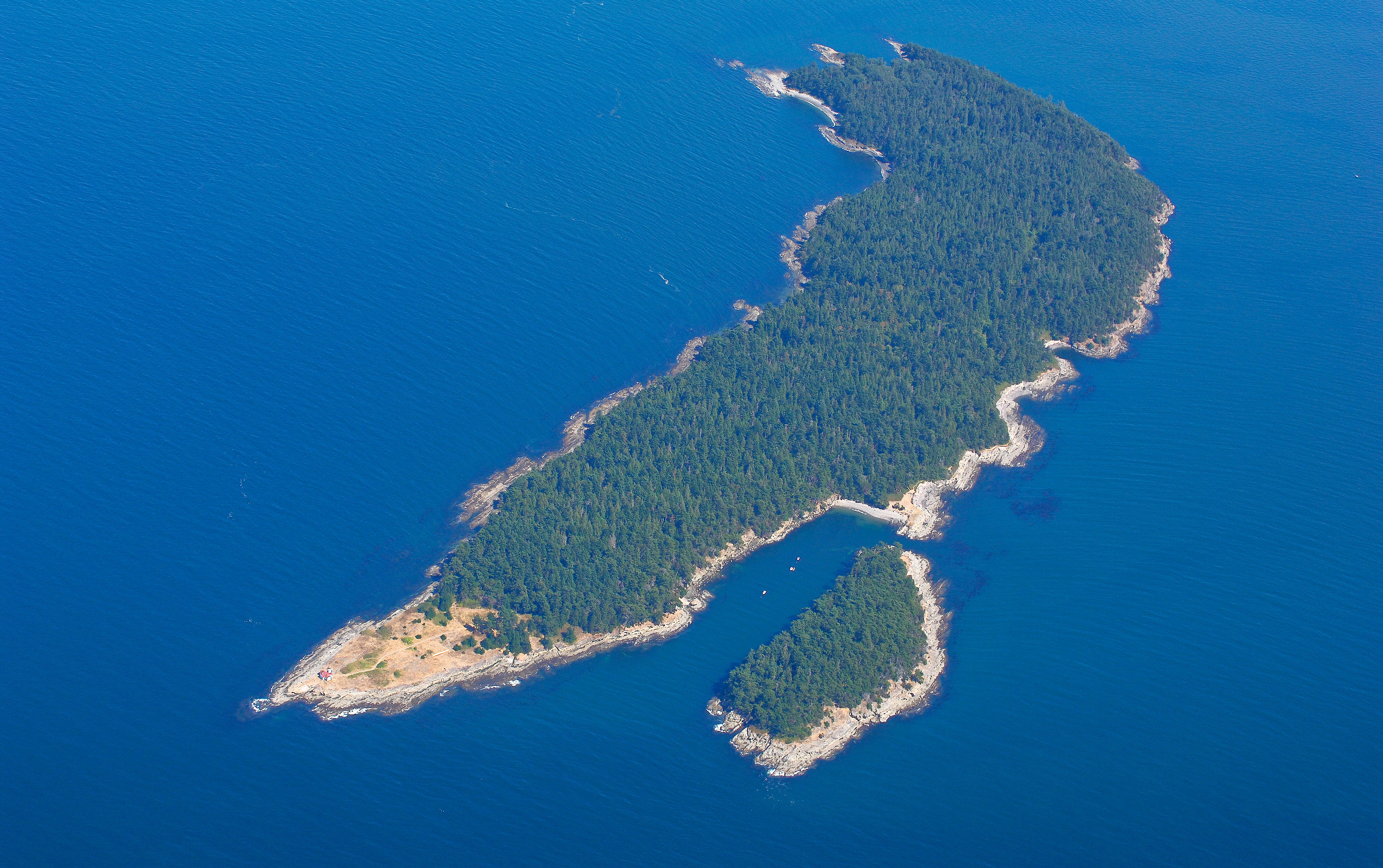
Aerial view of Patos Island and Little Patos Island

== Ecology ==
Patos Island is largely forested, including old-growth forests that have never been logged, with small native grassland areas on the western cape of the island. The 85 acres (34 ha) of old-growth on the eastern side of the island is home to the best example of western redcedar-grand fir-western swordfern forest association in Washington state, a particularly rare association with only five other instances in the state. Other rare associations on the island and neighboring Little Patos Island include ones with Douglas fir, salal, oceanspray, Pacific madrone and western hemlock.

The island was home to 257 species of vascular plants during a plant survey conducted in 2005, including certain plants not found on any other island in the San Juans, making it one of the most diverse islands in the island group.

== History ==
=== Indigenous use and European colonization ===
Prior to European colonization, Patos Island served as a seasonal fishing, hunting, and camping ground for the Lummi (Xwlemi) and Samish (Xws7ámesh) people, as well as Canadian First Nations including the Saanich (W̱SÁNEĆ). The Samish call the island Tl’x’óy7ten in the Samish dialect of North Straits Salish, meaning "Place of Harvesting Oysters," while in the Saanich dialect it is called PEN¸ÁW̱EṈ. The Lummi also refer to the rich oyster harvesting on the island in the Lummi dialectal name for it, Klu-whit-eton, meaning "Place of Abundant Oysters." Throughout the 19th and 20th centuries, the Lummi and Samish continued to use the island to fish despite increased European presence and fishery restrictions.

Europeans first reached Patos Island on June 15, 1791 with the landing of Juan Pantoja y Arriaga, the pilot of the Santa Saturnina (formerly the North West America) on José María Narváez and Francisco de Eliza's expedition into what is now called the Strait of Georgia. Pantoja y Arriaga anchored a longboat off the southeast point of Patos Island at 7pm and spent the night before continuing on to the nearby Sucia Island. The name Patos comes from the Spanish pato, meaning "duck," which was given to the island in 1792 by Commander Dionisio Alcalá Galiano of the Sutil and Captain Cayetano Valdés y Flores of the Mexicana. It is unknown whether the name was given for the presence of ducks on the island or for a rock formation resembling a duck on the island's east side. Galiano and Valdés later shared their charts with Captain George Vancouver, who was surveying the area on behalf of the United Kingdom. Charles Wilkes of the 1841 United States Exploring Expedition listed it as Gourd Island, but the United States Coast Survey and the British Admiralty each retained the Spanish name on their charts in 1854 and 1874, respectively.

Patos Island was among the contested islands in the 1859 Pig War between the United States and the United Kingdom, a dispute settled in favor of the United States during the 1871-1872 Treaty of Washington negotiations. The resolution to the Pig War set the boundary in the Haro Strait and Boundary Pass, due west of Patos Island. The border was further solidified in the 1908 "Treaty Between the United States of America and the United Kingdom Concerning the Boundary Between the United States and the Dominion of Canada from the Atlantic Ocean to the Pacific Ocean," with surveys by the International Boundary Commission in the 1920s drilling boundary markers and bearings into foundations on Patos Island, serving as permanent marks of the present-day Canada–United States border. The border was revised by the International Boundary Commission to pass between Patos Island and Saturna Island in a straight line, rather than a curved line as established by the 1870s Treaty of Washington negotiations.

While conducting hydrographic surveys for the U.S. Coast Survey from 1857 to 1860, Captain James Alden lent his name to Alden Point, at the island's western edge; Alden also named nearby Active Cove, between Patos and Little Patos Islands, after his vessel, the USCS Active. The British Admiralty christened the eastern cape Toe Point in 1858.

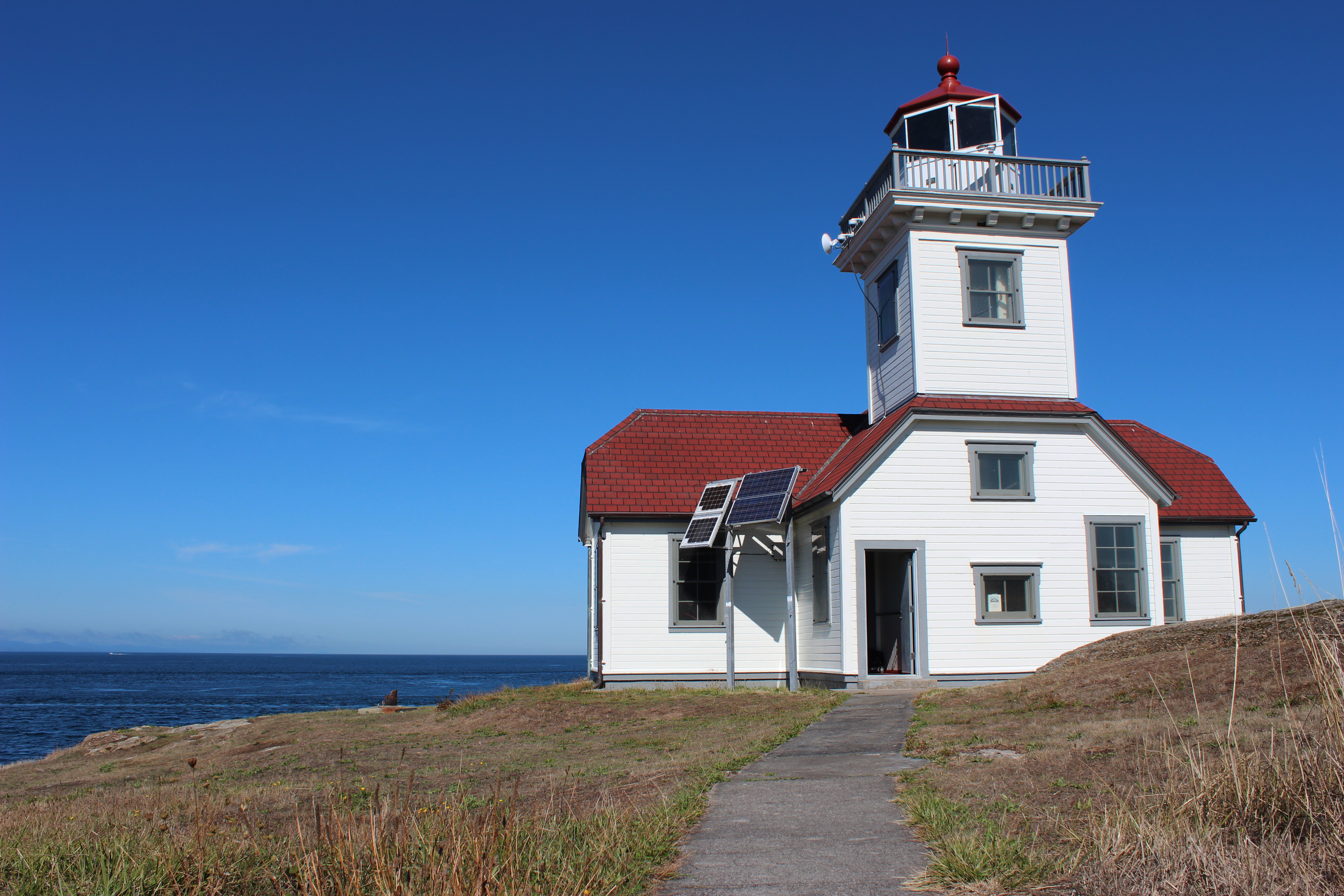
Patos Island Light Station

=== Lighthouse period ===
Boundary Pass was deemed to require a navigational aid due to tidal factors, reefs, and whirlpools, which caused several press-worthy shipwrecks in the late 19th century, including that of the Zephyr (1872) John Rosenfeld (1886). Prior to the construction of Patos Light, Boundary Pass was illuminated on the Canadian side by Saturna Island's East Point Light, built in 1888. Patos island was established as a lighthouse reservation by the U.S. federal government in 1875, when the Treaty of Washington took effect, and surveyed in 1891. The light station was constructed in 1893. Upon the creation of the lighthouse, the island became an attraction for the public, with several hundred visiting each year, often staying with the lighthouse keepers or camping on the island. The second lighthouse keeper, Edward Durgan, brought his wife and children to the island, including his daughter Helen, who would go on to write The Light on the Island about her time growing up on Patos Island.

Throughout the early 20th century, the island was a hub for fish piracy, with thieves stealing from fish traps owned by local canneries and evading the United States Revenue Cutter Service cutters that patrolled the waters around the island. Historian Matt Villeneuve has suggested that various crimes on Patos Island in the 1910s, including robberies and stolen vessels abandoned on its shores, were associated with fish piracy in the San Juan Islands. The island also served as a base of operations for revenue cutters in the period from 1893–1951. Patos Island and the Patos Island Light served in this time-frame as the centerpiece of what Villeneuve describes as a "maritime borderland," in which both the law and criminal elements played a role. Alongside fish piracy, the island played a role in the smuggling of Chinese laborers from Canada in the 19th century, rum-running during Prohibition, and cannabis in the later 20th century and into the present-day. The United States Coast Guard assumed control of the lighthouse and the island in 1939, when the U.S. Lighthouse Board was merged into the USCG.

=== World War II and post-War period ===
In 1942, following the attack on Pearl Harbor in 1941 and the U.S. entry into World War II, a second tower was constructed on Patos Island and the U.S. Navy joined the Coast Guard presence on the island. The second tower was built to hold around-the-clock watch for hostile military presence, including ships and submarines, as well as planes and balloons. During the war, Patos Island light remained off as protection for the military installation, though it was re-activated for necessary transits of Boundary Pass to the Gulf Islands and Vancouver Island and the Inside Passage to Alaska. War-time restrictions on fishing in the San Juan Islands were enforced from Patos Island, and many areas were prohibited from civilian access. No combat occurred within the vicinity of Patos Island, as the closest military engagement of the war occurred on the west side of Vancouver Island, at Estevan Point.

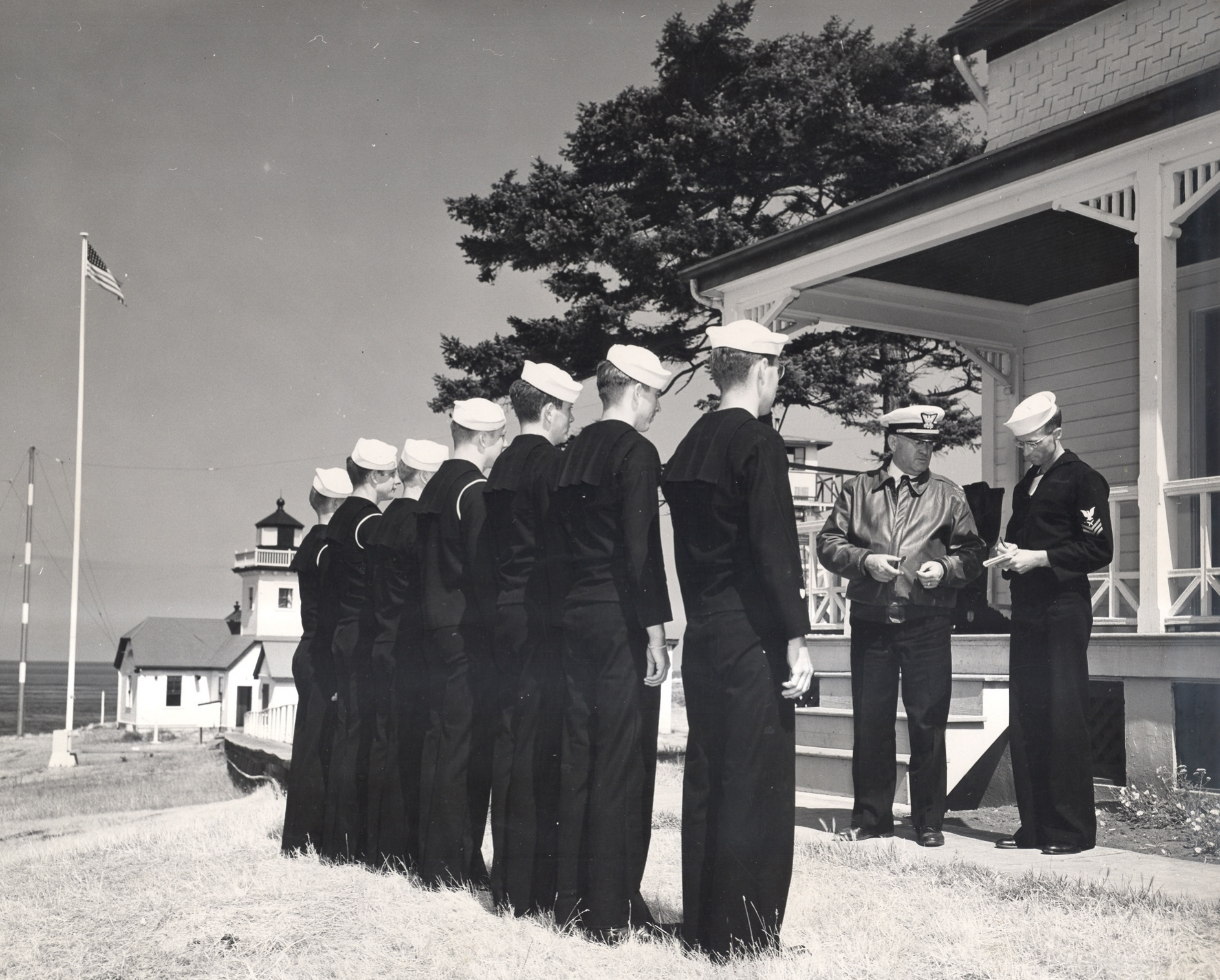
Troops stationed on Patos Island during World War II

Navy and Coast Guard troops were mustered out of Patos Island in 1945, following the conclusion of the war, but the Coast Guard retained control of the Patos Island lighthouse. Other structures, including roadways, sidewalks, and barracks, fell into disuse. The Coast Guard ended their full-time presence on Patos Island in 1978, shortly after the lighthouse was automated and added to the National Register of Historic Places, ending 78 years of continuous habitation. The Coast Guard relinquished most of the island to the Bureau of Land Management in 1987.

=== Present-day ===
The Washington State Parks and Recreation Commission began leasing the island from the Coast Guard in 1974, with a provision for the creation of campsites, creating Patos Island Marine State Park. In 2002, when the Coast Guard relinquished full control to the Bureau of Land Management, the Coast Guard buildings were demolished and the lighthouse was renovated by 2007. The entire island, including the lighthouse, became part of the San Juan Islands National Monument upon its creation by U.S. President Barack Obama in 2013.

Upkeep of the island is shared between the Bureau of Land Management, which continues to own the island, the lessee Washington State Parks, and the "Keepers of the Patos Light", a nonprofit organization focused on preserving the National Historic Site of Patos Light. The Keepers of the Patos Light staff an interpretive center in the lighthouse during select summer weekends.

== Recreation ==
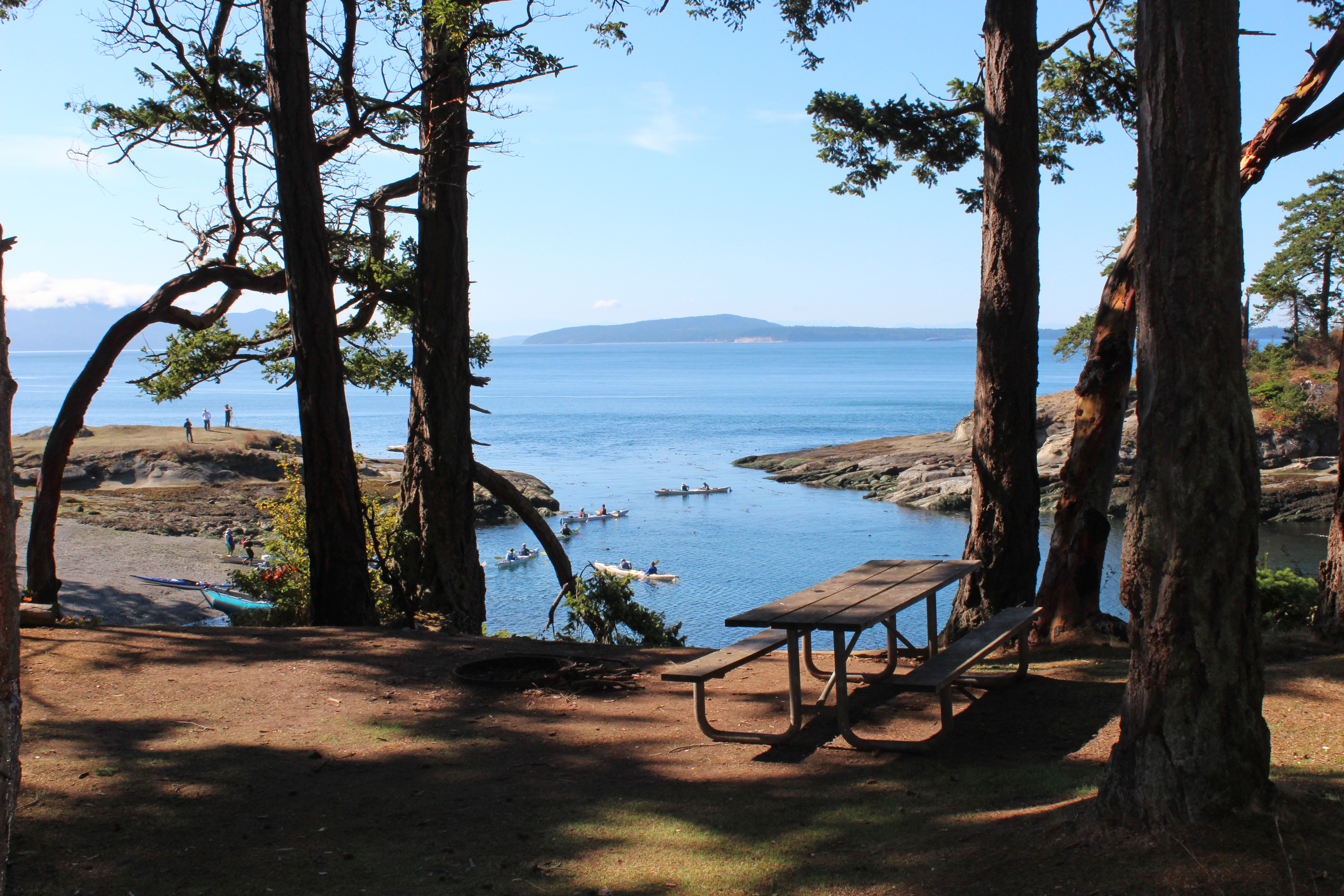
Patos Island recreation site on Active Cove

In 2014, Patos Island saw 8,500 visitors. The island has seven primitive camp sites, a picnic area, and a scenic trail that leads to the lighthouse. There is no potable water and the recreation facilities are served by two composting toilets. In addition to the historic lighthouse and remnants of Coast Guard building foundations, the island is known for wildlife viewing, with both a registered marine mammal haul-out site and seasonally nesting seabirds, fishing, and crabbing. Unlike the more developed west side of the island, the east side has been designated as wilderness by the BLM.

The island is only accessible by boat and sea kayak, with mooring buoys available in Active Cove, located in the small channel between Patos Island and Little Patos Island. Point Roberts, Orcas Island, and Blaine are the nearest American ports-of-call to Patos Island.

=== Patos Island Race ===
Since 1981, Patos Island has served as the focal point of the Patos Island Race, a qualifier for the Van Isle 360 International yacht race. The race source sets out from Sidney, British Columbia, circumnavigates Patos Island, and returns to Sidney in a day-long, overnight regatta. It is considered part of the "Triple Crown" of Vancouver Island yacht races, which also includes the Swiftsure Yacht Race and the Round Saltspring Race.

== See also ==
- The Light on the Island
