= Carl W. Leick =

American architect

Carl W. Leick (1854 –June 10, 1939) was an architect who worked in the Northwest of the United States. He designed structures for 25 sites on the West Coast, including the Turn Point (1893), Patos (1908), Point Wilson (1913–14) and Lime Kiln (1914) lighthouses.

Leick was born in Germany, where he received his professional education and training. In the 1880s, he moved to Astoria, Oregon. His Astoria designs include the Captain George Flavel House and the Grace Episcopal Church.

In 1889, Leick moved to Portland, Oregon, to work as a draftsman for the Engineering Office of the 13th Lighthouse District of the U. S. Light House Board. The office designed navigational aids for maritime traffic throughout the Northwest. As a light station designer, Leick's motto was "Build 'em stout, and make 'em last." Extant examples of his work include the Admiralty Head Lighthouse (18 inch brick walls; his last design made in 1902; unique double arches on front porch) located in Fort Casey Historical State Park, which is within the Central Whidbey Historical District and Ebey's Landing National Historical Reserve on Whidbey Island, Washington (1903) and the Grays Harbor Lighthouse at Westport, Washington (1898). The Mukilteo Light Station is one of several similar wood-frame light stations, designed by Leick, including the second Ediz Hook Light (1908) and the second light at Cape Arago, Oregon. From 1911 to 1926, Leick served as assistant superintendent in the office of the U.S. Lighthouse Inspector. He retired in 1926.
