= Turn Point Light Station =

Turn Point Light
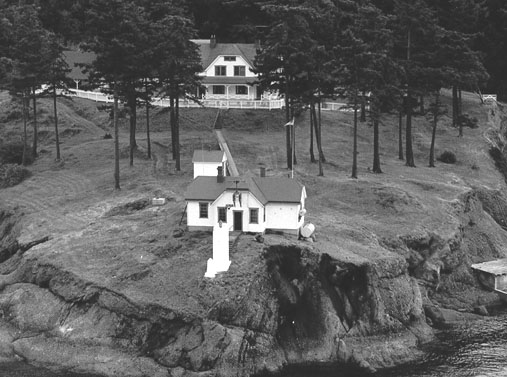
- Location: Stuart Island, Washington
- Coordinates: 48°41′21″N 123°14′14″W

Tower
- Constructed: 1893
- Foundation: Surface
- Construction: Concrete
- Automated: 1974
- Height: 20 feet (6.1 m)
- Shape: Square

Light
- First lit: 1893
- Focal height: 13 m (43 ft)
- Lens: 12 inches (300 mm)
- Range: 8 nmi (15 km; 9.2 mi)
- Characteristic: White flash every 2.5 s

The Turn Point Light Station is an active aid to navigation overlooking Haro Strait from the western tip of Stuart Island, San Juan County, Washington, in the northwest of the United States. The light marks a sharp turn in the shipping lanes at the transition between Haro Strait and Boundary Pass.

== History ==
Operations at Turn Point commenced in 1893 with the construction of a fog signal building, a two-story keeper's quarters, and a barn. The structures were designed by U.S. Lighthouse Board architect Carl W. Leick. The station's first light was a lens lantern displayed from a post located close to the point. A Daboll trumpet served as the fog signal.

As originally configured, the Daboll trumpet was powered by compressed air furnished by air-pumps driven by two Rider hot-air engines (a form of Stirling cycle engine). This machinery, and a supply of coal to fuel the engines, was located in the fog signal building.

The hot air engines were found to be underpowered. In 1900 they were replaced with internal combustion engines.

In 1913, an oil storage building was constructed to house a supply of fuel for the fog signal engines.

The light was electrified in 1925. Electricity for the navigation light and also for the lightkeeper's house was furnished by generators installed in the fog-signal building, in the room previously used to store coal for the old hot-air engines.

In 1936, a square concrete tower was added to the site with a 12-inch (300 mm) light emanating at a 44-foot (13 m) focal plane. A diaphragm foghorn replaced the Daboll trumpet.

The station was automated in 1974.

The fog signal was removed in approximately 2010. The light is still in service.

The station is owned by the U.S. Coast Guard and managed by the U.S. Bureau of Land Management. It is part of the San Juan Islands National Monument, which was created in 2013. Volunteers through the Turn Point Lighthouse Preservation Society offer seasonal docent guided tours of the original 1893 Keepers House. The fog signal building houses a small museum presenting the history of the light station. Information about the orca whales who frequent the waters off Turn Point is displayed the oil storage building.
