= Cotton Point Island =

Island in Washington

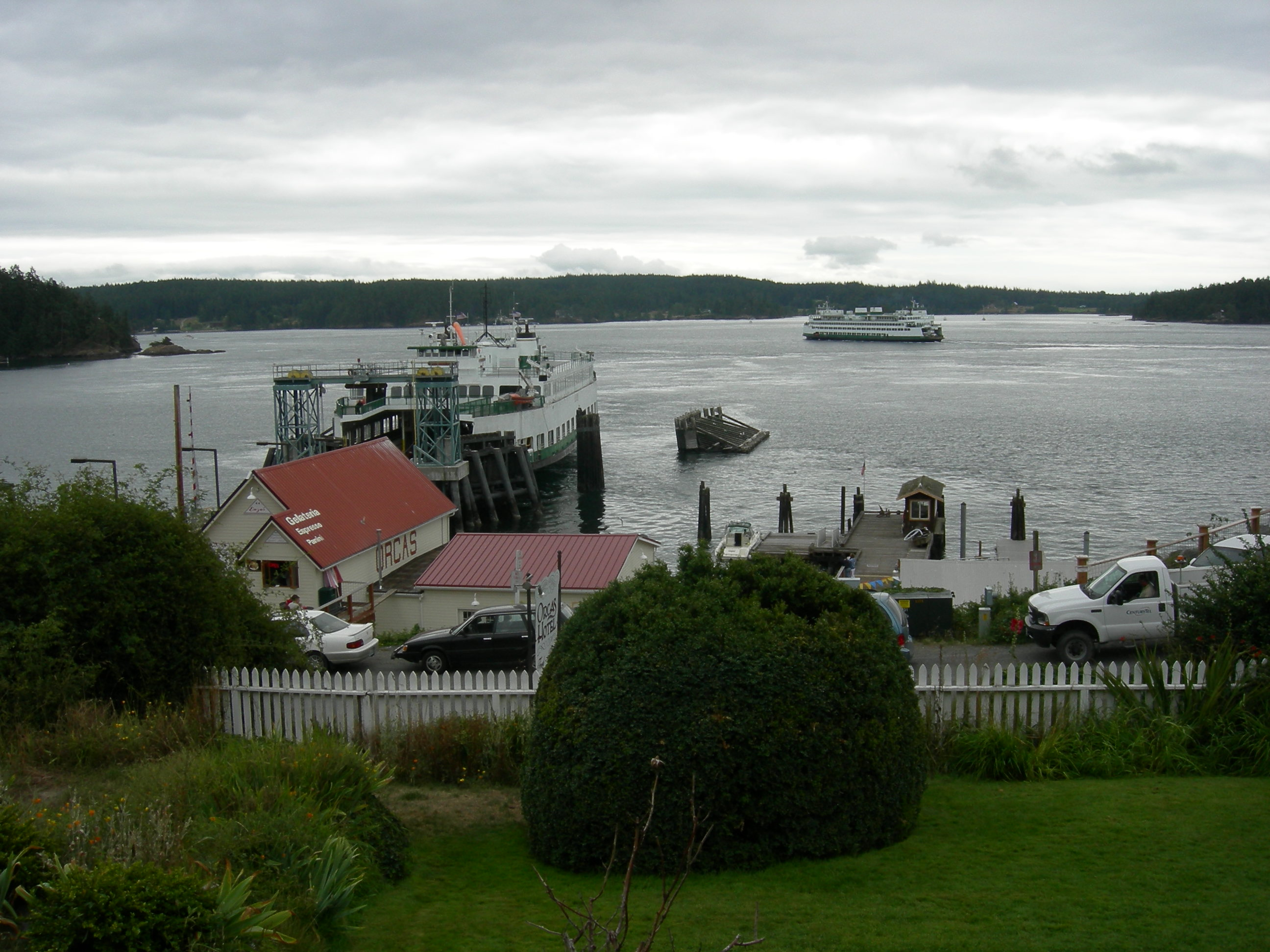
- Cotton Point Island to viewer's left of Washington State Ferries vessel at Orcas landing

- Location within Washington (state)

Geography
- Location: Salish Sea
- Coordinates: 48°35′37.50″N 122°56′12.74″W
- Archipelago: San Juan Islands
- Area: 0.25 acres (0.10 ha)

Administration
- United States of America
- State: Washington
- County: San Juan

Cotton Point Island is a 0.25-acre (0.10 ha) island in Washington State, a few meters offshore of Cotton Point on Orcas Island. It is part of the San Juan Islands National Monument and owned by Bureau of Land Management, perhaps its smallest holding in Washington.
