= Haro Strait =

Navigable international boundary waterway connecting Juan de Fuca and Georgia Straits

- French: Détroit de Haro
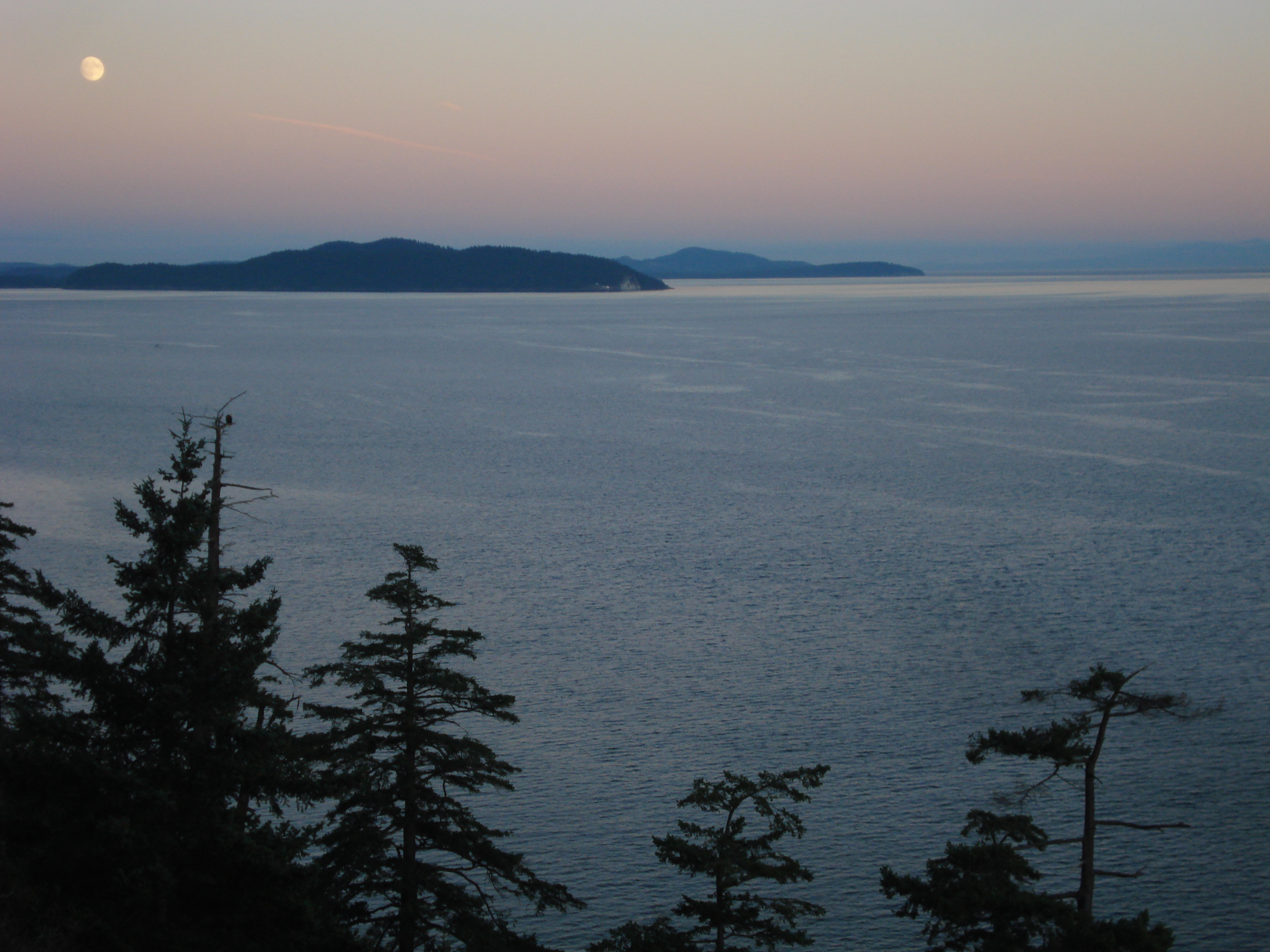
- View of Haro Strait from South Pender Island

- Location within British Columbia

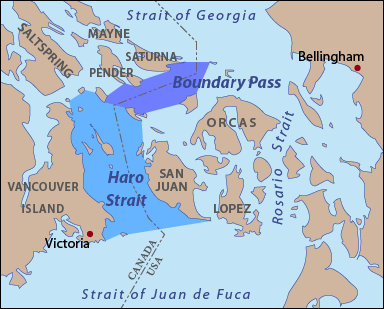
- Map of Haro Strait and Boundary Pass according to USGS definitions
- Location: British Columbia and Washington
- Coordinates: 48°33′N 123°13′W
- Type: Strait
- Part of: Salish Sea
- Basin countries: Canada and United States
- Max. length: 36 km (22 mi)
- Max. width: 19 km (12 mi)
- Settlements: Victoria, Saanich, Sidney

The Haro Strait is one of the main channels connecting the Strait of Georgia to the Strait of Juan de Fuca, separating Vancouver Island and the Gulf Islands in British Columbia, Canada from the San Juan Islands of Washington state in the United States.

The strait is a critical part of the international boundary between Canada and the United States. It stretches from the western terminus of the 49th parallel segment of that boundary, and was chosen by the arbitrator in the San Juan Islands dispute (Pig War) over the Rosario Strait.

== Definition ==
According to the USGS, Haro Strait's southern boundary with the Strait of Juan de Fuca is formed by a line between Discovery Island, just east of Victoria, to Cattle Point at the southern tip of San Juan Island. Haro Strait's northern boundary is defined by a line running from the north tip of the Saanich Peninsula through Piers Island, Portland Island, and Moresby Island, then from Point Fairfax on Moresby Island to Turn Point on Stuart Island, then from the southern end of Stuart Island to McCracken Point at the north end of Henry Island, then to Mitchell Bay on San Juan Island. By this definition Haro Strait does not directly join with the Strait of Georgia. The main channel and international boundary runs from Haro Strait north through Boundary Pass to reach the Strait of Georgia.

== History ==
Haro Strait and other waters flanking the Gulf Islands and San Juans were the home of Straits Salish peoples including the Lummi, Saanich, and Klallam, but the route's natural importance as a regional waterway made it also an important sea-route for raiding and also for regular trade for all marine peoples of the Northwest Coast.

Haro Strait was named in 1790 by Manuel Quimper, commander of Princesa Real, in honor of his pilot, Gonzalo López de Haro. In 1791 Francisco de Eliza sent José María Narváez far into the Strait of Georgia via Haro and Rosario Straits. In 1792 Haro Strait was explored and mapped by George Vancouver. An alternate theory about the naming was proposed by Edmond S. Meany, who suggested that Haro Strait was named for Alonso Núñez de Haro y Peralta, Archbishop of Mexico from 1772 to 1800, and, for several months during 1787, Viceroy of New Spain.

Haro Strait's status as the location of the international boundary was not established until the resolution of the San Juan Islands dispute in 1870, when it was selected by an arbitrator, German Kaiser Wilhelm I, over Rosario Strait, on the eastern side of the San Juans, which was preferred by the British and would have made the San Juans part of British Columbia, as they were originally viewed to be by the British after the Oregon Treaty of 1846.

Haro Strait is also an important location for the regional commercial fishery, as the bulk of the Fraser River salmon run uses the Haro Strait to enter that river.

D'Arcy Island on the Canadian side of the strait was a leper colony for Chinese immigrants in the 19th century.

Older USGS maps, such as the 1976 edition of the Victoria quadrangle (1:250,000 scale), show Haro Strait as encompassing Boundary Pass, passing south of Saturna Island.

== Navigation ==
Haro Strait is a major shipping channel. Haro Strait, along with Boundary Pass, is the westernmost and most heavily used of the three main channels connecting the Strait of Juan de Fuca and the Strait of Georgia. Haro Strait joins Boundary Pass at Turn Point on Stuart Island, where a major navigation beacon, Turn Point Light, is located. Heavy, dangerous rip tides occurs near Turn Point, as well as near the northern end of Boundary Pass, between Patos Island Light on Patos Island and East Point on Saturna Island.

Much shorter than the Rosario Strait, though more difficult to navigate and less sheltered, the strait is the main shipping channel to the Port of Vancouver and other ports around the Gulf of Georgia from the open sea. Navigation through American waters in this stretch by Canadian vessels is sanctioned by the Oregon Treaty, which stipulated that commercial shipping south of the 49th Parallel in these waters would be unmolested.

== Fauna ==
The strait is a favourite locale for whale-watching tours based in Greater Victoria and also in the San Juans because of the density and variety of its marine life, including orcas (killer whales), sea lions, seals and a large range of different species of sea birds.

== See also ==
- Juan Carrasco (explorer)
- Oregon Treaty
