= Eliza Island =

Island in Whatcom County, Washington

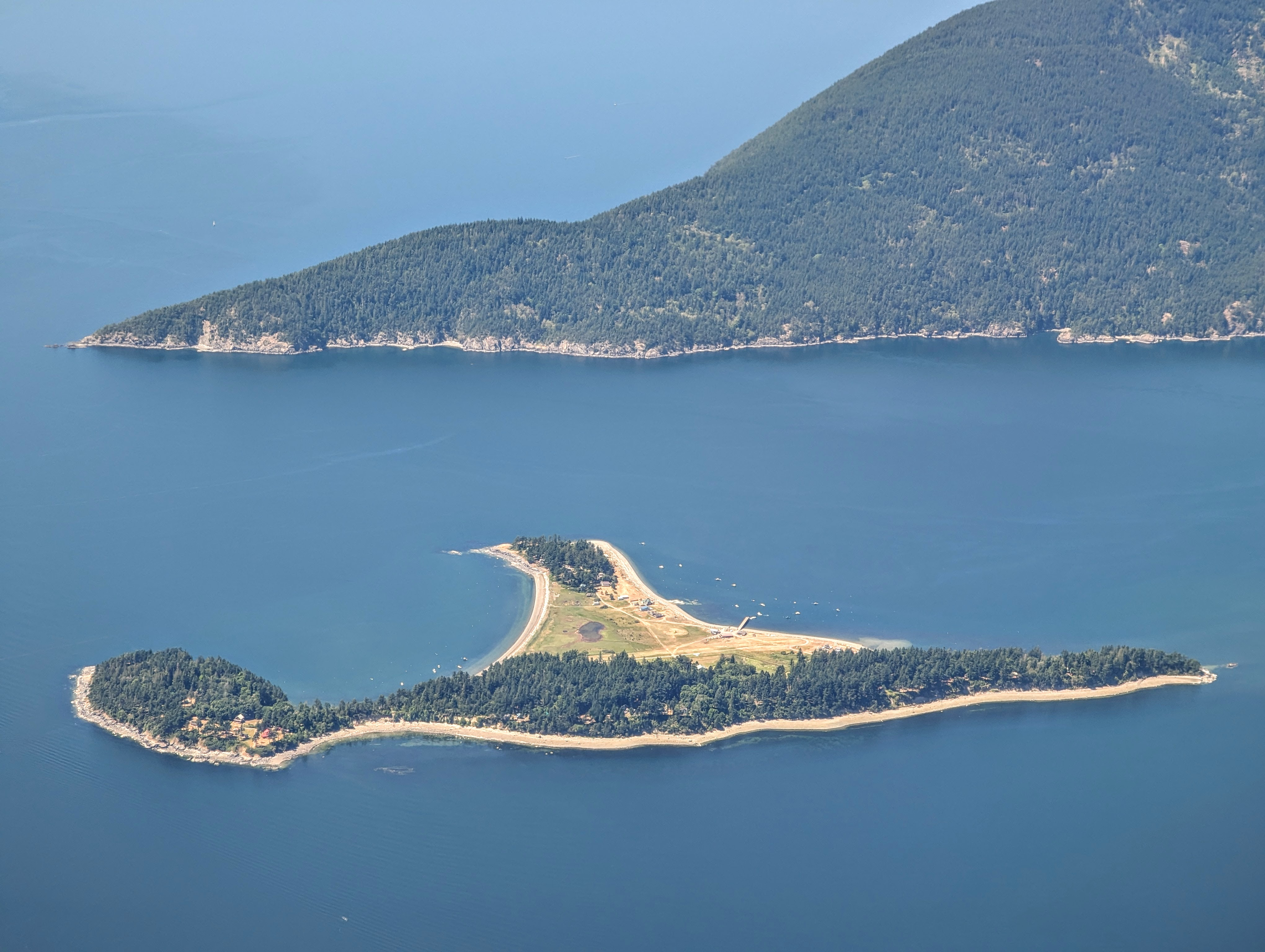
- Aerial view of Eliza Island with Lummi Island behind
- Interactive map of Eliza Island

Geography
- Location: Salish Sea
- Coordinates: 48°39′09″N 122°35′06″W
- Area: 170 acres (69 ha)

Administration
- United States
- State: Washington
- County: Whatcom

Demographics
- Population: 14 (2020)

Eliza Island (Straits Salish: Texwech) is located in the western part of Bellingham Bay in the U.S. state of Washington. It lies just east of the southern part of Lummi Island, in Whatcom County. Eliza Island has a land area of 170 acres (69 ha). Its population was 14 in the 2020 census.

== Etymology ==
The island was named by Charles Wilkes during the Wilkes Expedition of 1838–1842. One of the few names given by Wilkes that does not honor either members of his crew or American naval officers, Eliza possibly refers to Francisco de Eliza, the Spanish commander of a 1791 expedition to the Pacific Northwest. Wilkes may have named the island for his daughter or his sister, both also named Eliza.

The name in Lummi dialect, Texwech, means "shaped like a bow".

== Geology ==
Eliza Island is composed primarily of glacial drift between two bedrock knobs, with a sandbar connecting to a third knob to the west. The knobs are composed of rock from the Lummi Formation, largely metagreywacke.

== Access ==
Eliza Island is only accessible via private charter or plane by its residents.

== Eliza Rock ==
Eliza Rock is a rock off the south end of Eliza Island. It is 0.343 acres (1,390 m^{2}), circular and relatively flat. A navigational aid, called the Eliza Rocks Junction Light, is on the rock. The rock is part of the San Juan Islands National Wildlife Refuge and is home to pigeon guillemots, harbor seals, black oystercatchers, pelagic cormorants, and Steller sea lions, with young seals and oystercatchers being present on the rock during a survey in 2009.
