= The Light on the Island =

1951 novel by Helene Glidden

- First edition
- Author: Helene Glidden
- Cover artist: Cliff Roberts
- Language: English
- Publisher: Coward-McCann
- Publication date: 1951
- Publication place: United States
- Media type: Print (Hardcover & Paperback)
- Pages: 216 pp
- ISBN: 0-9707399-0-7
- OCLC: 46895158

The Light on the Island, by Helene Glidden, recounts her early years in the lighthouse on Patos Island in Washington State's San Juan Islands. Set during Edward Durgan's eight-year term as lighthouse keeper from 1905 to 1913, it offers a child's perspective on a number of adult themes, including death, murder, strong language, and smugglers. It has been suggested that many of the events in the book could not have happened as described and that many of the characters were not on the island, either from flawed memory or the desire to make the story more interesting.
