= Strait of Georgia =

Waterway between Vancouver Island and mainland North America

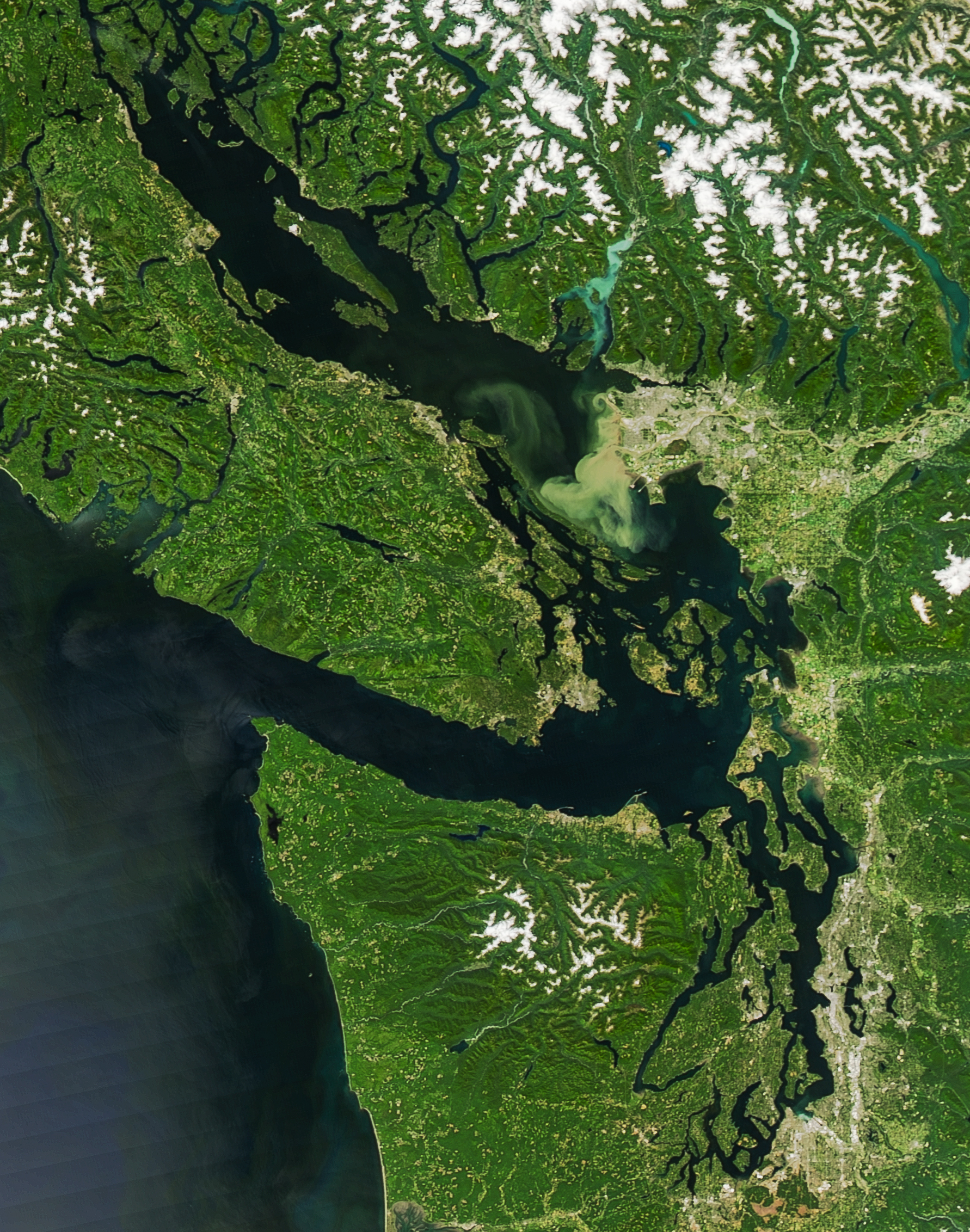
- The Strait of Georgia with sediment from the Fraser River clearly visible.

- Location within Vancouver Island Location within British Columbia
- Location: British Columbia and Washington
- Coordinates: 49°17′39″N 123°48′26″W
- Part of: Salish Sea
- River sources: Fraser River, Squamish River
- Ocean/sea sources: Pacific Ocean
- Basin countries: Canada and United States
- Surface area: 6,800 km^{2} (2,600 mi^{2})
- Average depth: 156 m (512 ft)
- Max. depth: 420 m (1,380 ft)
- Residence time: 160 days
- Sections/sub-basins: Malaspina Strait
- Settlements: Vancouver, Surrey, Richmond, Delta, Nanaimo, Courtenay, Point Roberts, Blaine, Birch Bay

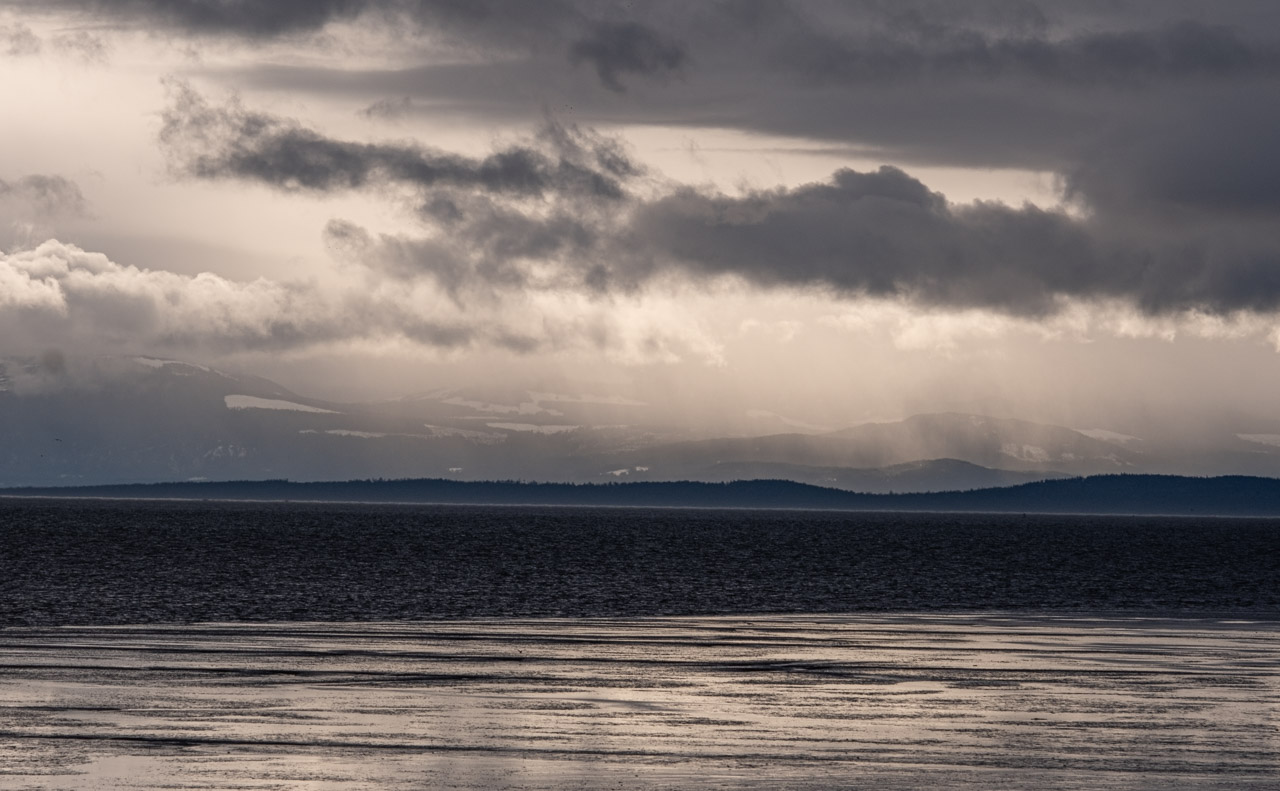
Looking west across the strait from Iona Park in Richmond towards Gabriola and Valdes Islands.

The Strait of Georgia (French: Détroit de Géorgie) or the Georgia Strait is an arm of the Salish Sea between Vancouver Island and the extreme southwestern mainland coast of British Columbia, Canada, and the extreme northwestern mainland coast of Washington, United States. It is approximately 240 kilometres (150 mi) long and varies in width from 20 to 58 kilometres (12 to 36 mi). Along with the Strait of Juan de Fuca and Puget Sound, it is a constituent part of the Salish Sea.

Archipelagos and narrow channels mark each end of the Strait of Georgia, the Gulf Islands and San Juan Islands in the south, and the Discovery Islands in the north. The main channels to the south are Boundary Pass, Haro Strait and Rosario Strait, which connect the Strait of Georgia to the Strait of Juan de Fuca. In the north, Discovery Passage is the main channel connecting the Strait of Georgia to Johnstone Strait. The strait is a major navigation channel on the west coast of North America, owing to the presence of the port of Vancouver, and also due to its role as the southern entrance to the Intracoastal route known as the Inside Passage.

== Geography ==
The United States Geological Survey defines the southern boundary of the Strait of Georgia as a line running from East Point on Saturna Island to Patos Island, Sucia Island, and Matia Island, then to Point Midgley on Lummi Island. This line touches the northern edges of Rosario Strait, which leads south to the Strait of Juan de Fuca, and Boundary Pass, which leads south to Haro Strait and the Strait of Juan de Fuca.

The Strait of Georgia has a mean depth of 156 m (512 ft) and average surface area of 6,800 km^{2} (2,600 mi^{2}). The Ballenas Basin in the centre of the strait reaches a maximum depth of 420 m (1,380 ft) approximately 15 km (9.3 mi) north of Nanaimo.

The Fraser River accounts for roughly 80 percent of the freshwater entering the strait. Water circulates in the strait in a generally counterclockwise direction.

=== Major islands ===
The strait contains several major islands, the largest by far being Texada Island at 300.45 km^{2} (116.00 mi^{2}). Other major islands include Nelson Island, Denman Island, Lasqueti Island, and Hornby Island.

=== "Gulf of Georgia" ===
The term "Gulf of Georgia" includes waters other than the Georgia Strait proper, such as the inter-insular straits and channels of the Gulf Islands, and may refer to communities on the shore of southern Vancouver Island. As defined by George Vancouver in 1792, the Gulf of Georgia included all the inland waters beyond the eastern end of the Strait of Juan de Fuca, including Puget Sound, Bellingham Bay, the waters around the San Juan Islands, as well as the Strait of Georgia.

== History ==
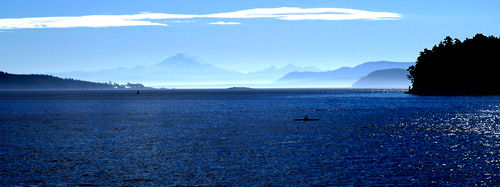
Georgia Strait in the morning

First Nations communities have surrounded the Strait of Georgia for thousands of years. The first European exploration of the area was undertaken by Captain Jose Maria Narvaez and Pilot Juan Carrasco of Spain in 1791. At this time Francisco de Eliza gave the strait the name "Gran Canal de Nuestra Señora del Rosario la Marinera."

In 1792, it was renamed for King George III as the "Gulf of Georgia" by George Vancouver of Great Britain, during his extensive expedition along the west coast of North America. Vancouver designated the mainland in this region as New Georgia and areas farther north as New Hanover and New Bremen.

The June 23, 1946, Vancouver Island earthquake shocked the Strait of Georgia region, causing the bottom of Deep Bay to sink between 3 and 26 m (9.8 and 85.3 ft).

The two busiest routes of the BC Ferries system cross the strait, between Tsawwassen (south of Vancouver) and Swartz Bay (near Victoria) and between Horseshoe Bay (north of Vancouver) and Nanaimo.

The Strait of Georgia is known as a premier scuba diving and whale watching location.

In 1967, the Georgia Strait inspired the name of Vancouver's alternative newspaper, The Georgia Straight, which has been published continuously since.

== Cities ==
Towns and cities on the strait include Campbell River, Courtenay, Comox, Qualicum Beach, Parksville, Lantzville, and Nanaimo on the western shore, as well as Powell River, Sechelt, Gibsons, and Greater Vancouver on the east.

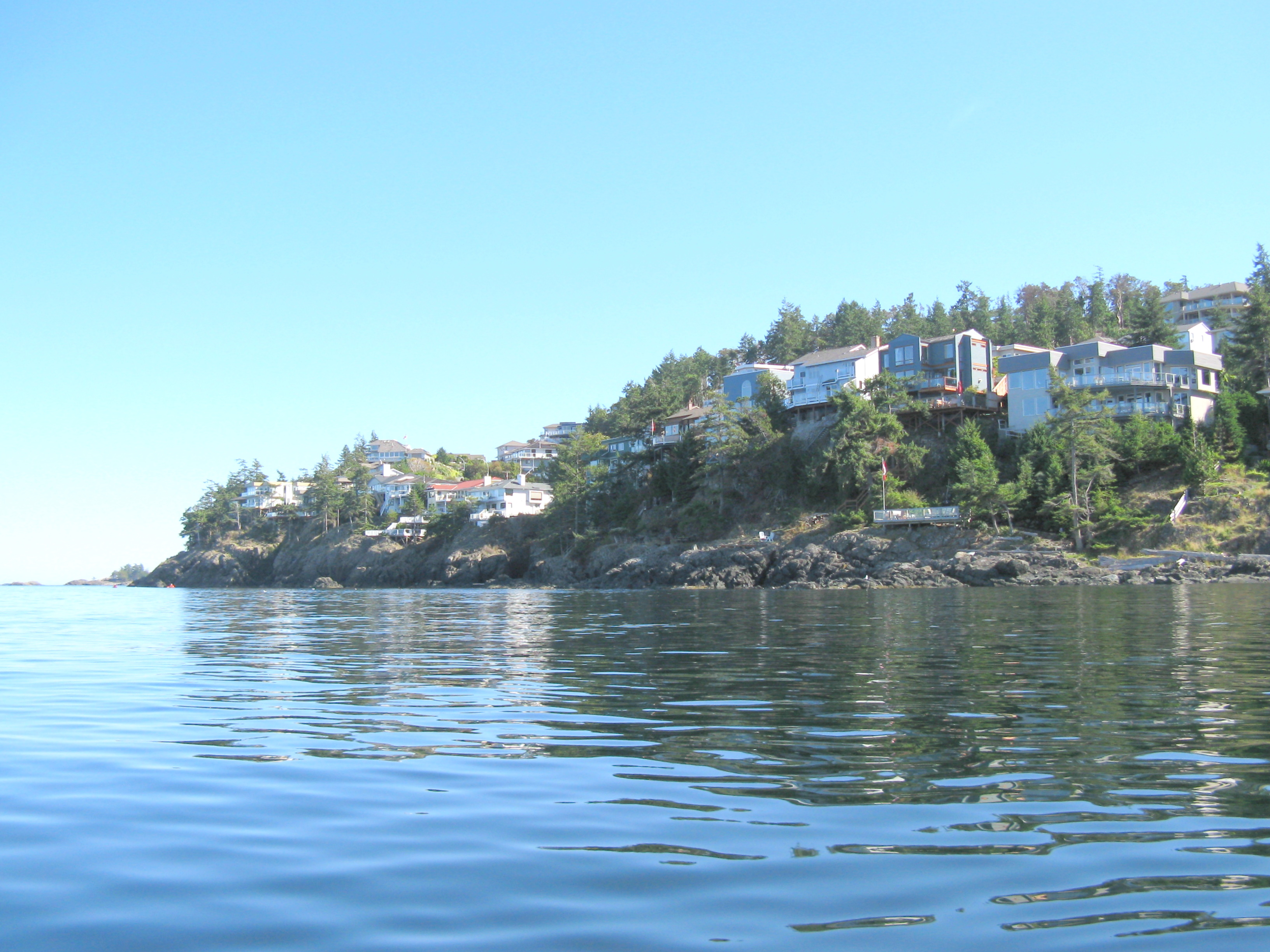
Nanaimo from Georgia Strait

Across the border in the United States, Bellingham, Washington and other communities also lie on the eastern shore. Other settlements on Vancouver Island (such as Duncan) and the mainland are separated from Georgia Strait itself by islands and lesser straits but are often spoken of as being in the Strait of Georgia region.

== Transportation ==
BC Ferries operates ferry services connecting Vancouver Island with the mainland. Notable lines include Duke Point-Tsawwassen, Departure Bay-Horseshoe Bay, and Little River-Westview. Minor ferry operators and water taxis provide service to minor islands dotting the strait.

== Salish Sea ==
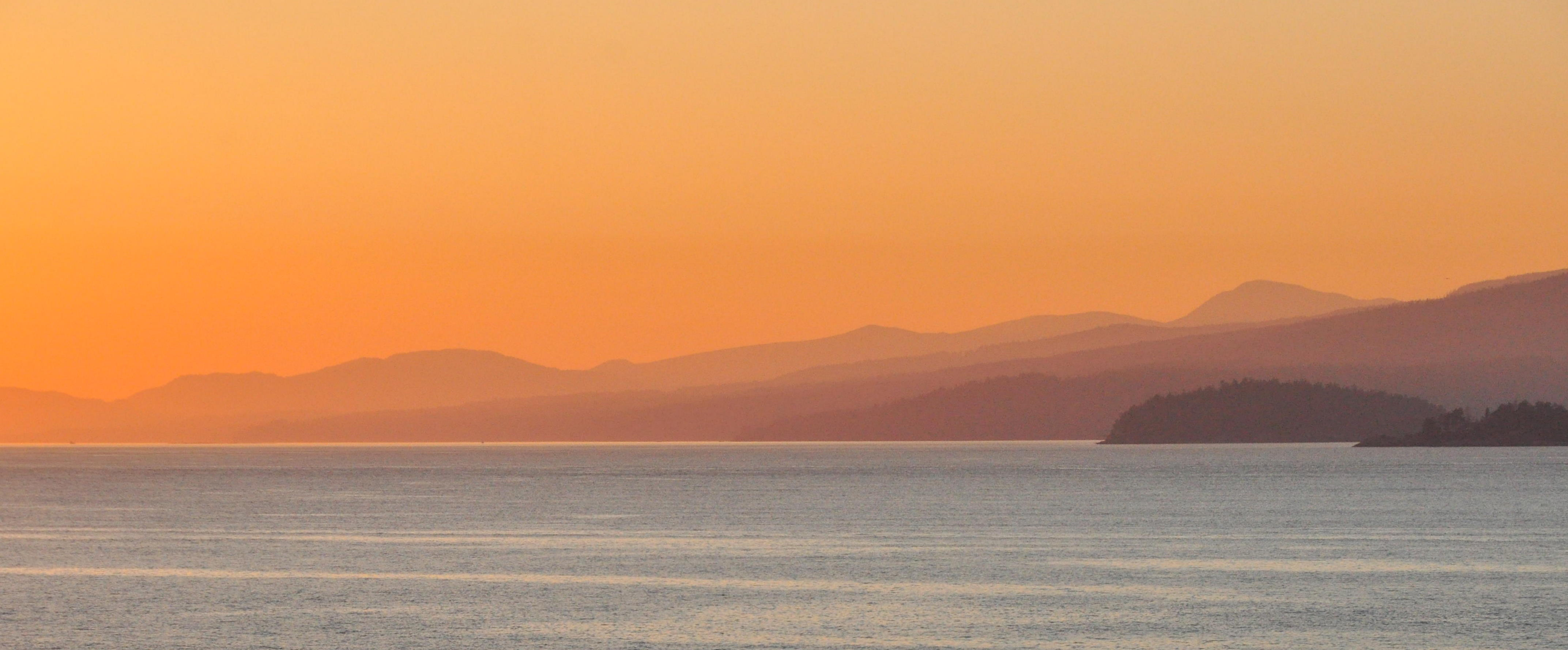
Sundown over the strait from the ferry

In March 2008, the Chemainus First Nation proposed renaming the strait the "Salish Sea", an idea that reportedly met with approval by B.C.'s Aboriginal Relations Minister Mike de Jong, who pledged to put it before the B.C. cabinet for discussion. Making the name "Salish Sea" official required a formal application to the Geographical Names Board of Canada. A parallel American movement promoting the name had a different definition, combining of the Strait of Juan de Fuca and Puget Sound as well as the Strait of Georgia and related waters under the name Salish Sea. This latter definition was made official in 2009 by geographic boards of Canada and the United States.

In October 2009, the Washington state Board of Geographic Names approved the Salish Sea toponym, not to replace the names of the Strait of Georgia, Puget Sound, and Strait of Juan de Fuca, but instead as a collective term for all three. The British Columbia Geographical Names Office passed a resolution recommending that the name only be adopted by the Geographical Names Board of Canada should its US counterpart approve the name change. The United States Board on Geographic Names approved the name on November 12, 2009 and Canada approved it in 2010.

== Counties and regional districts facing the Strait ==
- British Columbia
  - Capital Regional District
  - Comox Valley Regional District
  - Cowichan Valley Regional District
  - Metro Vancouver Regional District
  - Nanaimo Regional District
  - qathet Regional District
  - Strathcona Regional District
  - Sunshine Coast Regional District
- Washington
  - San Juan County
  - Whatcom County

== See also ==
- Howe Sound
- Sunshine Coast
- Burrard Peninsula
- Georgia Basin
- Royal eponyms in Canada
