= Boundary Pass =

Strait between the United States and Canada

- French: Passe Frontière
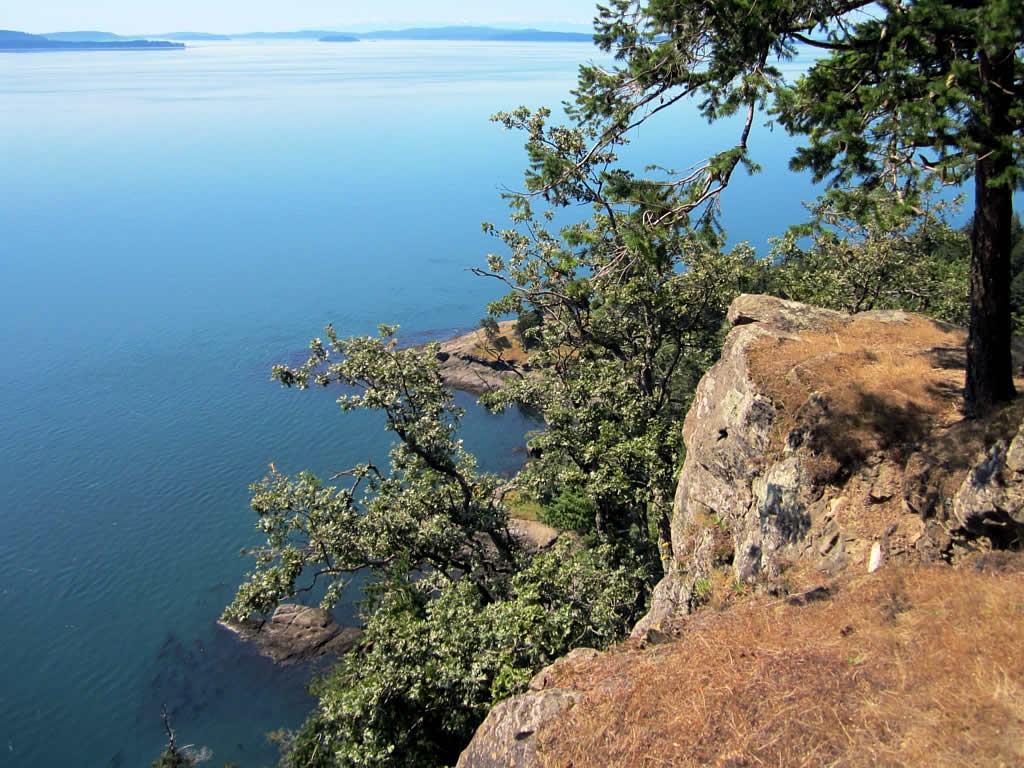
- View of Boundary Pass from Monarch Head, Saturna Island

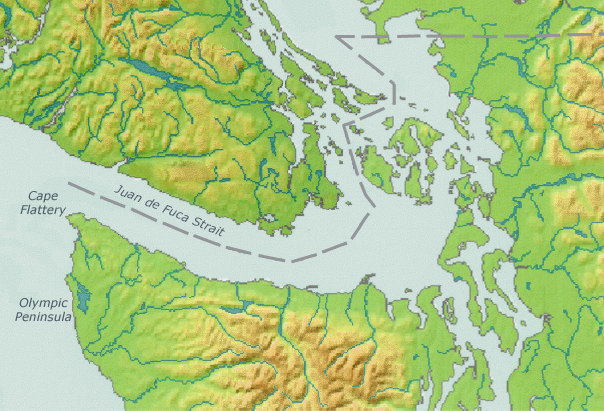
- Location within Strait of Juan de Fuca Location within British Columbia

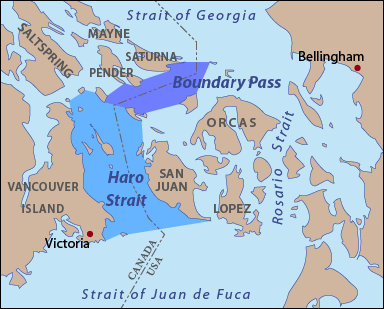
- Map of Boundary Pass and Haro Strait according to USGS definitions
- Location: British Columbia and Washington
- Coordinates: 48°43′00″N 123°08′00″W
- Type: Strait
- Part of: Salish Sea
- Basin countries: Canada and United States
- Max. length: 23 km (14 mi)

Boundary Pass is a strait that runs for about 23 kilometres (12 nmi) along the boundary between the U.S. state of Washington and the Canadian province of British Columbia. It connects Haro Strait to the south with the Strait of Georgia to the north.

The USGS defines its northern boundary as a line extending from East Point on Saturna Island to Alden Point on Patos Island. Its southeastern boundary is a line from Alden Point on Patos Island to Point Hammond on Waldron Island then from Sandy Point on Waldron Island to Charles Point on Stuart Island. Its southwestern boundary is a line connecting Turn Point on Stuart Island to Point Fairfax on Moresby Island. Its western boundary is a line running from Pelorus Point on Moresby Island to Wallace Point on North Pender Island then to Tilly Point on South Pender Island then from Teece Point on South Pender Island to Taylor Point on Saturna Island.
