= Burgoyne (disambiguation) =

Burgoyne is a surname.

Burgoyne may also refer to:

== Places ==
- Burgoyne, Ontario, a community of the municipality of Arran-Elderslie, Ontario, Canada
- Burgoyne Bay, British Columbia, Canada
- Fort Burgoyne, a fort northeast of Dover, England, United Kingdom
- 19543 Burgoyne, an asteroid

== People ==
- Burgoyne Diller (1906–1965), American abstract painter
- Burgoyne baronets, two British baronetcies

== Other uses ==
- The Burgoyne Hotel, Reeth, North Yorkshire, England
- Burgoyne Bridge, St. Catharines, Ontario, Canada
- D&KR Burgoyne Class, a class of mid-19th century steam locomotives, also the name of the class lead
- Ulmus americana 'Burgoyne', a cultivar of Ulmus Americana

== See also ==
- Burgoyne Bay Provincial Park, British Columbia, Canada
- Bourgogne (disambiguation)
- Burgundy (disambiguation)
