= Stuart Island (Washington) =

Westernmost of San Juan Islands in the Salish Sea archipelago in Washington, US

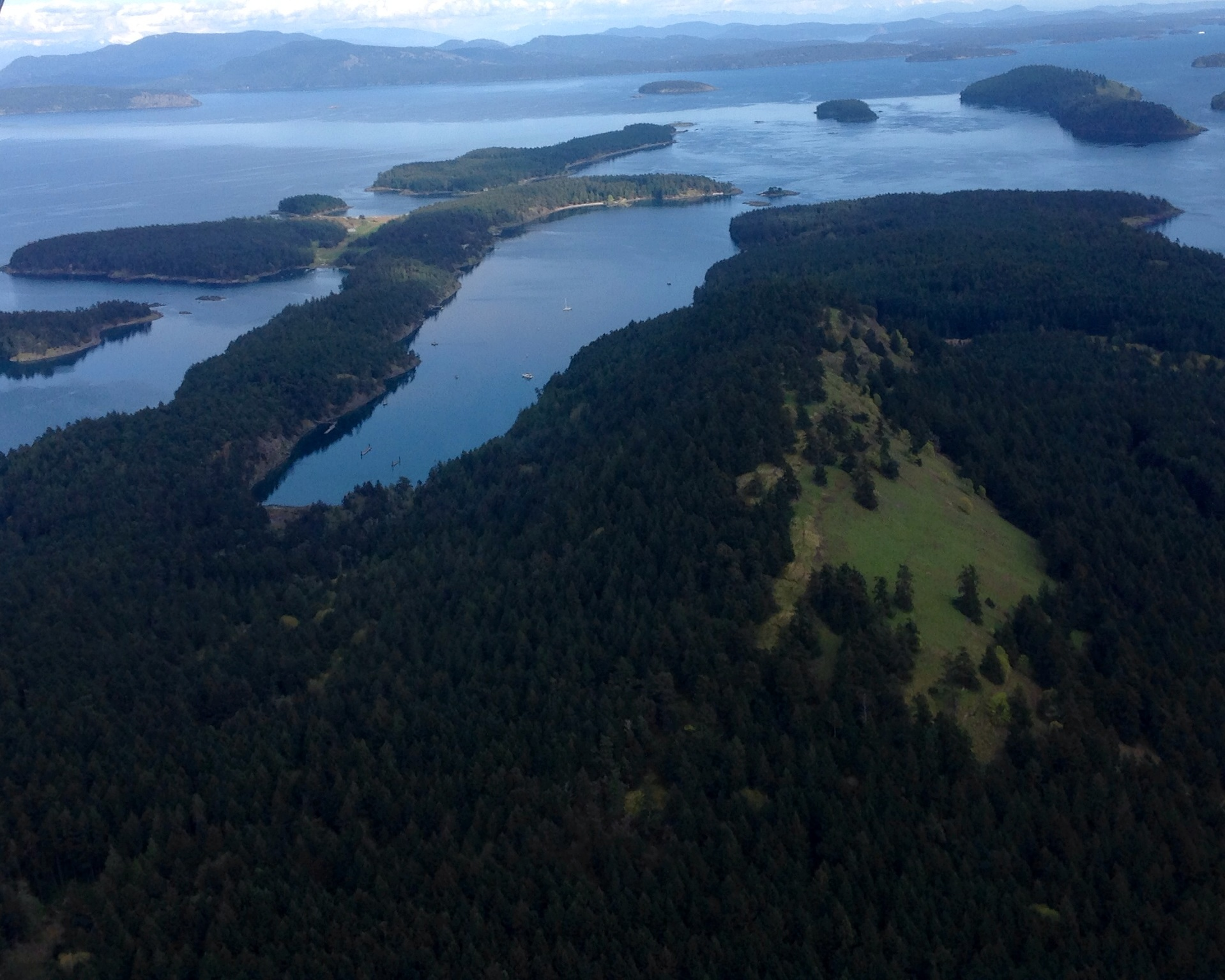
- South-facing aerial view of Reid Harbor on Stuart Island

- Location of Stuart Island within the San Juan Islands

Geography
- Coordinates: 48.6736°N 123.2051°W
- Archipelago: San Juan Islands
- Area: 7.462 km^{2} (2.881 sq mi)

Administration
- United States
- County: San Juan
- State: Washington

Stuart Island is one of the San Juan Islands, north of San Juan Island and west of Waldron Island in the U.S. state of Washington. The 7.462-square-kilometer (2.881 sq mi) island is home to two communities of full and part-time residents, a state park, a one-room schoolhouse, and two airstrips.

== History ==
Stuart Island was named by Charles Wilkes during the Wilkes Expedition of 1838–42, to honor Frederick D. Stuart, the captain's clerk of the expedition.

Prevost Harbor is named for James Charles Prevost, captain of HMS Satellite. Nearby Prevost Island in British Columbia is also named after Prevost, while Satellite Island is named after his ship.

== Arts and culture ==
=== Parks and recreation ===
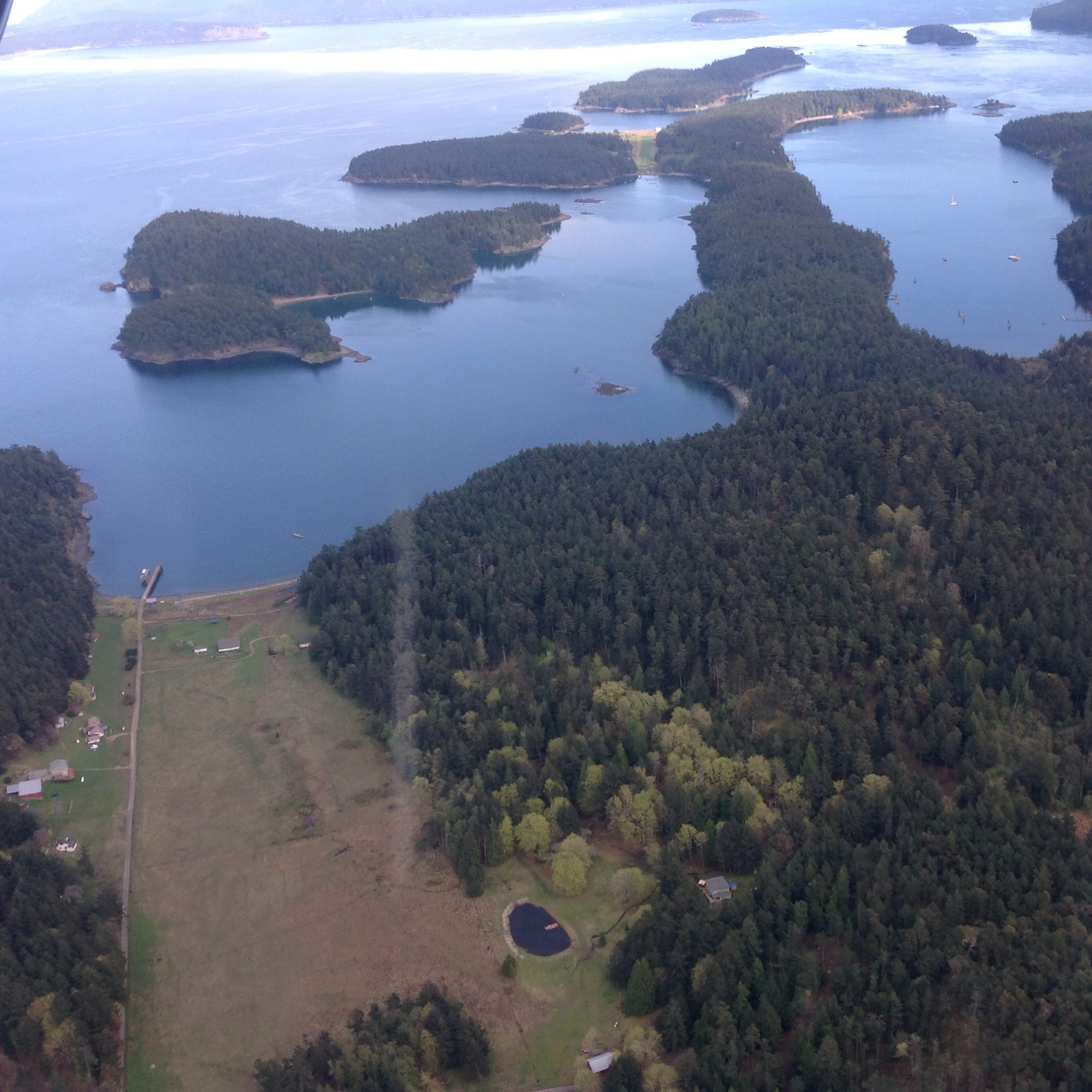
Stuart Island Airpark (background) lies on the eastern shore of Prevost Harbor across from Satellite Island

Two sites, both part of Stuart Island State Park, are on public lands. One is located near the center of the island, and another is on the western coast, the site of the Turn Point Light Station, a lighthouse guiding shipping in the busy waters of Boundary Pass to the island's north. Turn Point Light Station is on land administered by the Bureau of Land Management's Spokane District, Wenatchee Resource Area, Lopez Island Office.

Sheltered anchorages for boaters can be found in Reid Harbor and Prevost Harbor, with public state park facilities in each.

Satellite Island, which lies in Prevost Harbor on the northeast side of the island, is used by YMCA Camp Orkila as a basecamp for teen expeditions and for field trips by campers.

== Infrastructure ==
Two airstrips are located on the island. Stuart Island Airstrip (7WA5) is a 2,000-foot (610 m) grass runway, and Stuart Island West (2WA3) is a 1,560-foot (475 m) dirt runway). The island also includes a one-room schoolhouse part of the San Juan Island School District. The current schoolhouse building was built in 1980, and the original building from 1897 is now a small museum and library.

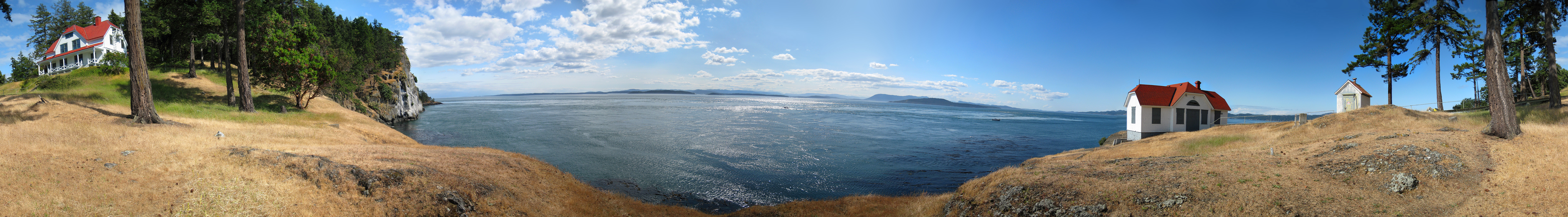
Panorama showing typical views from Turn Point.
