= Burgoyne Bay Provincial Park =

Provincial park in British Columbia, Canada

- IUCN category II (national park)
- Location within Vancouver Island Location within British Columbia
- Interactive map of Burgoyne Bay Provincial Park
- Location: Saltspring Island Land District, British Columbia, Canada
- Nearest city: Duncan, BC
- Coordinates: 48°47′08″N 123°31′00″W
- Area: 524 ha (1,290 acres)
- Established: May 17, 2004
- Governing body: BC Parks

Burgoyne Bay Provincial Park is a provincial park in British Columbia, Canada located on southwestern Saltspring Island near Fulford Harbour. The parks faces northwest to Sansum Narrows, which is the channel between Saltspring Island and Vancouver Island. Mount Maxwell Provincial Park lies adjacent to the north.

Burgoyne Bay was named in 1859 by Captain Richards for Commander Hugh Talbot Burgoyne VC, an officer aboard HMS Ganges. The park was established in 2004 via private land acquisition with an area of 334 hectares (830 acres), and further expanded in 2007 to 524 hectares (1,290 acres).
