= Satellite Island (Washington) =

Island in Washington, United States

Coordinates: 48.6814°N 123.1909°W

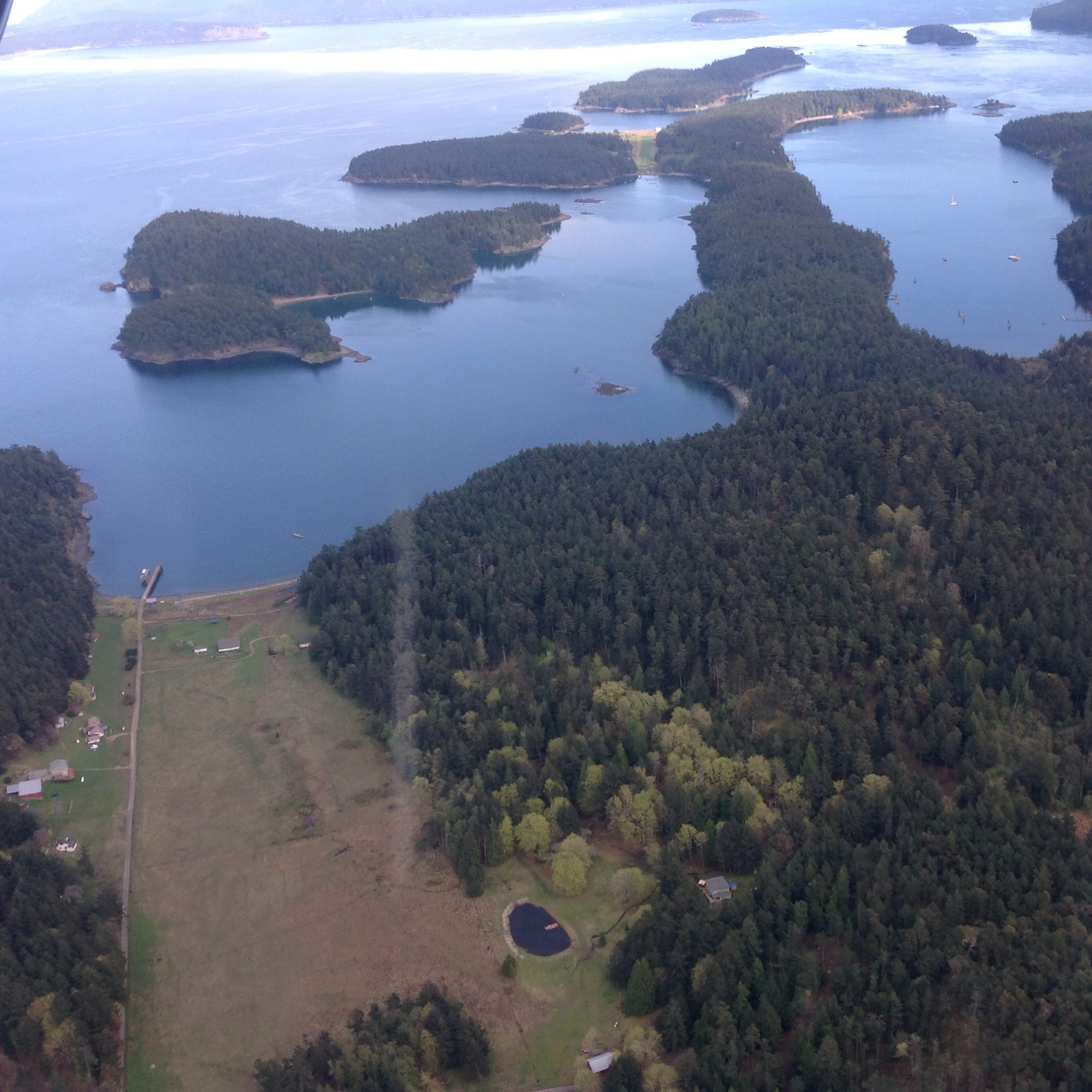
Stuart Island Airpark (foreground) lies on the western shore of Prevost Harbour across from Satellite Island

Satellite Island lies in Prevost Harbor on the north side of Stuart Island in the San Juan Islands of San Juan County, Washington, United States. It has a land area of 116.42 acres (47.11 ha) and no resident population as it is a private island owned by the YMCA, which has five camping areas set up for its use. Two of the camps, Sunset Camp and Fellowship Camp, are used for overnight island trips by campers from YMCA Camp Orkila and are located on the western half of the island. Islander Camp is located on the east side of the island, and is used primarily by the Islander Teen Expedition, a kayaking trip which crosses into Canada's Gulf Islands. Mariner Camp is located on the east side of the island, near Islander Camp, and is used by the Mariner Teen Expedition, a sailing trip for teenagers.

Satellite Island commemorates the ship (HMS Satellite) captained by the British naval officer James Charles Prevost, who was stationed at Vancouver Island from 1857 to 1860.
