= Mount Maxwell Provincial Park =

Provincial park in British Columbia, Canada

- IUCN category II (national park)
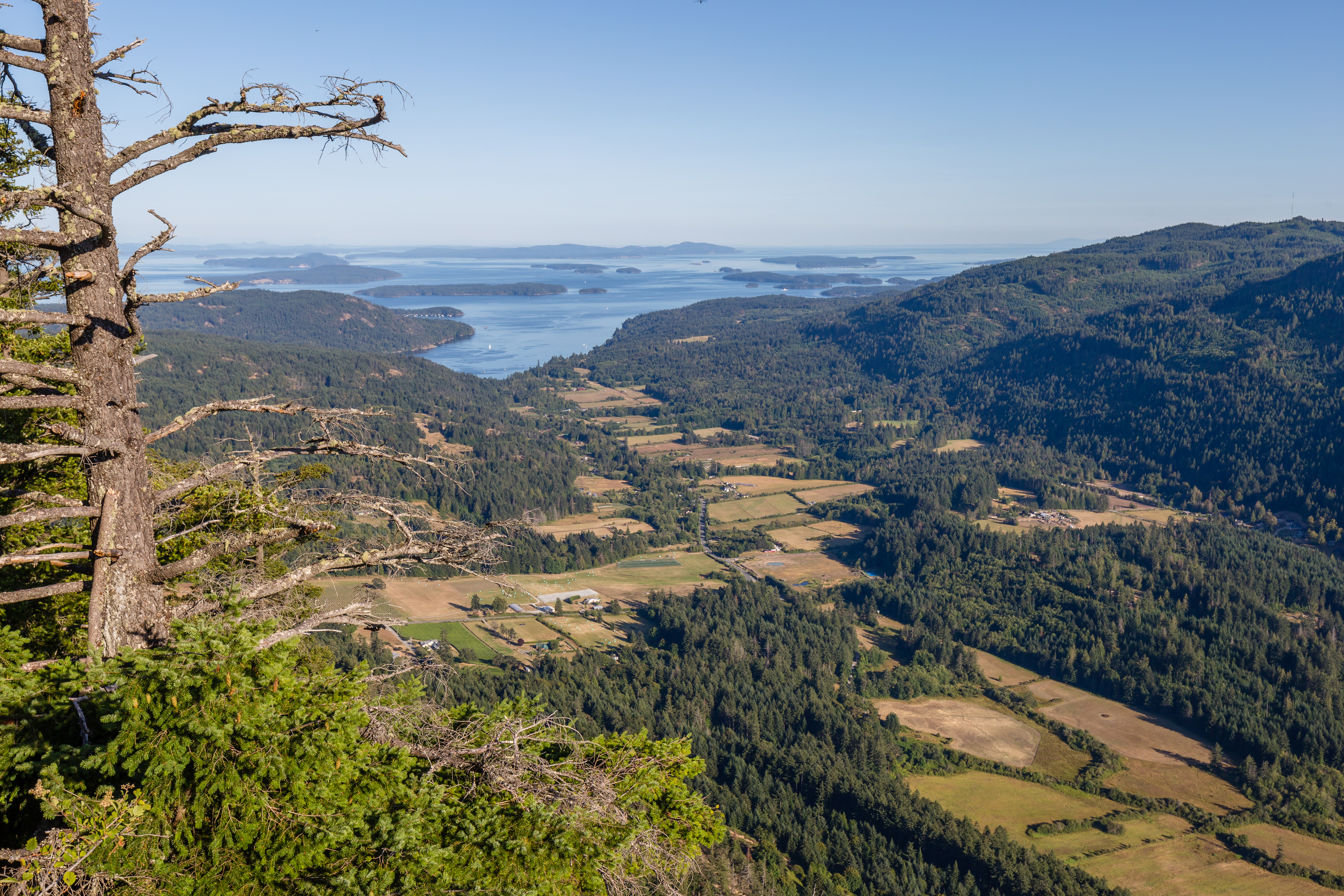
- View from Baynes Peak

- Location within British Columbia Location within Capital Regional District
- Interactive map of Mount Maxwell Provincial Park
- Location: Salt Spring Island, British Columbia
- Nearest city: Duncan
- Coordinates: 48°48′18″N 123°30′55″W
- Area: 231 ha (570 acres)
- Designation: Provincial Park
- Created: 1938
- Governing body: BC Parks

Mount Maxwell Provincial Park is a provincial park in the Gulf Islands of British Columbia, Canada. It is located on Burgoyne Bay and the Sansum Narrows on the western shores of Saltspring Island.

It was established in 1938 for the views afforded from Baynes Peak, the highest point on the mountain, which encompass Vancouver Island, the Gulf Islands and mainland British Columbia. It has an area of 231 hectares, but is adjoined by the Mount Maxwell Ecological Reserve to the west, and Burgoyne Bay Provincial Park to the south, creating a contiguous area of over 1100 ha of protected land.

== History ==
Mount Maxwell was initially named Mount Baynes by Admiralty surveyor George Henry Richards, after Admiral Sir Robert Lambert Baynes in about 1859. However, local inhabitants began calling it Mount Maxwell, a name which was officially accepted in 1911. When the park was created it was agreed to name the summit Baynes Peak. The Indigenous placename for Mt. Maxwell in the Hul'qumi'num language, is recognized as Hwmet'utsun, which means 'bent over place'.

== Accessibility ==
The mountain top can be accessed by gravel road, or by hiking trails from the north-east or Burgoyne Bay Provincial Park to the south. It has an elevation of 580m above sea level.

== Gallery ==
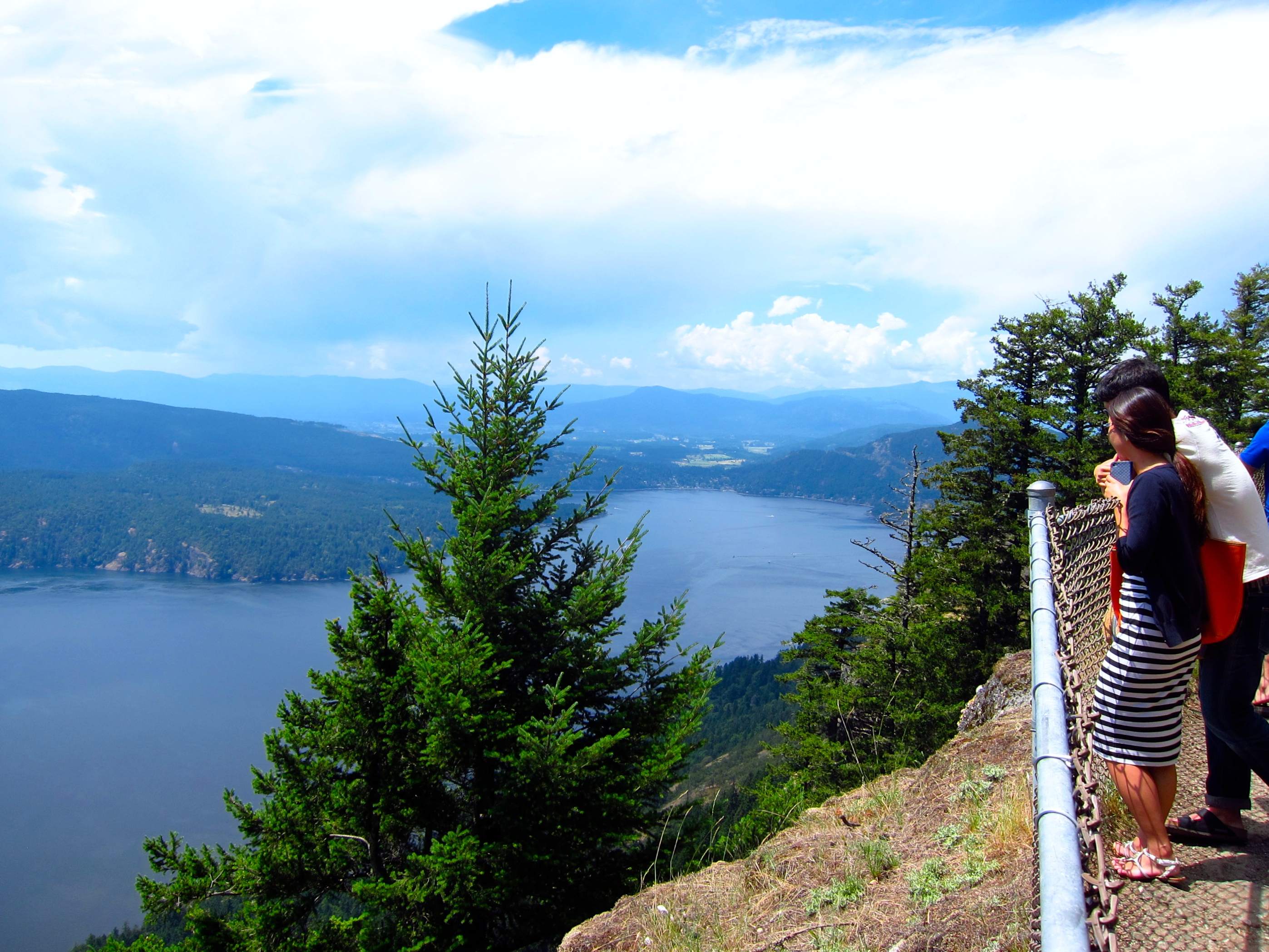
Mount Maxwell Provincial Park

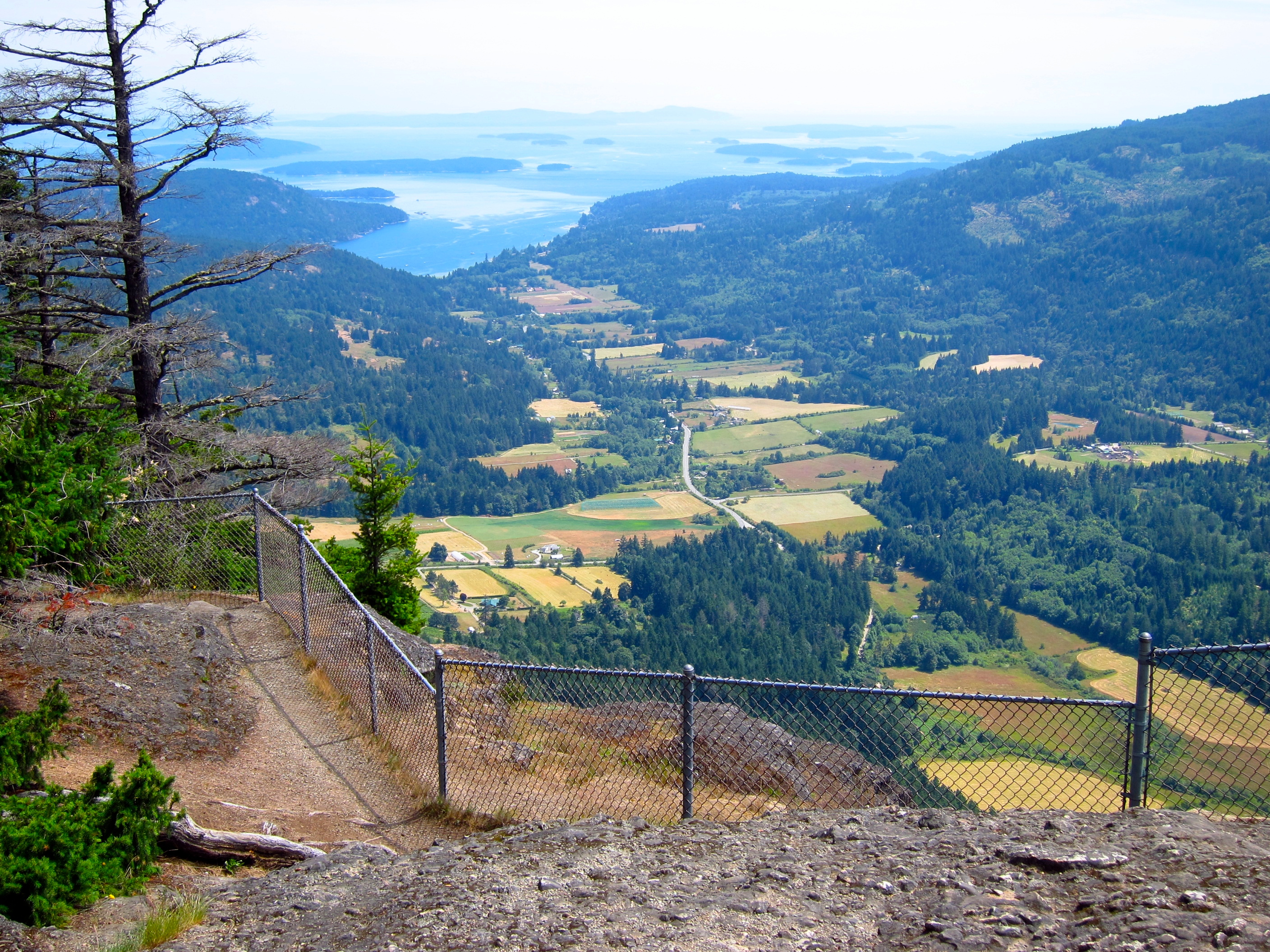
Mount Maxwell Provincial Park

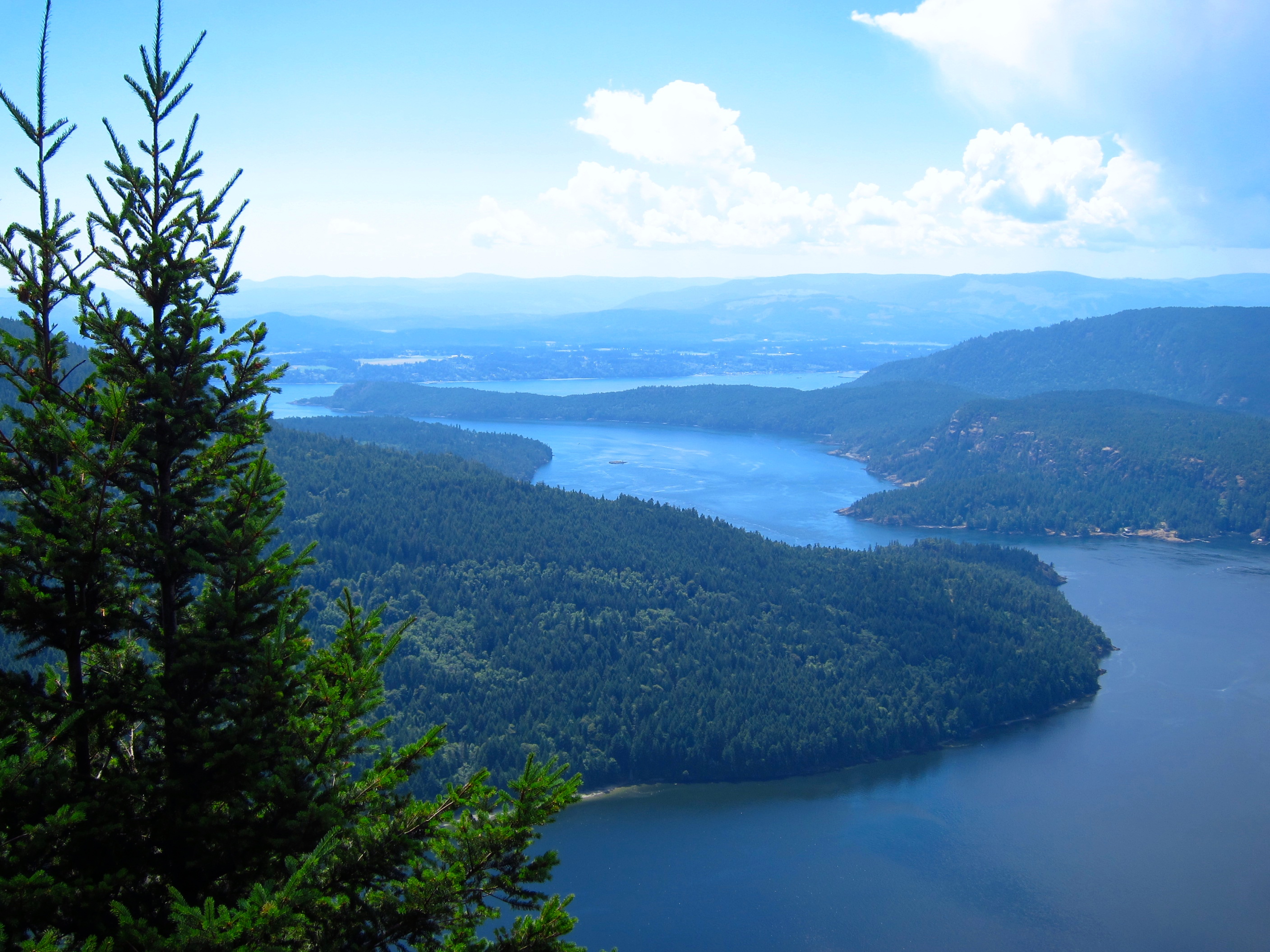
Mount Maxwell Provincial Park
