= Mount Prevost =

Mountain in British Columbia, Canada

- Swuq'us
- Location within Vancouver Island Location within British Columbia
- Location near Duncan and North Cowichan

Highest point
- Elevation: 788 m (2,585 ft)
- Prominence: 605 m (1,985 ft)
- Listing: Mountains of British Columbia
- Coordinates: 48°49′53″N 123°46′04″W

Naming
- Native name: Swuq'us (Halkomelem)

Geography
- Location: Vancouver Island, British Columbia, Canada
- District: Cowichan Land District
- Parent range: Vancouver Island Ranges
- Topo map: NTS 92B13 Duncan

Mount Prevost (Halkomelem: Swuq'us) is a mountain on Vancouver Island, British Columbia, Canada. It is northwest of Duncan and has a distinctive skyline with the two rock bluffs. On top of the highest north bluff is a war memorial.

== History ==
The mountain was featured in the legends of the creation of the Cowichan First Nation. During the Great Flood one man took refuge on top of Swuqus or Swukas (Prevost) while all the others died. In Sooke, there were two women who also stayed on high ground to escape the waters. When the waters receded they moved up island and found the lone Cowichan man. These three people are the ancestors of the Cowichan tribe.

The mount's modern name is a tribute to Captain James Charles Prevost, RN, who served aboard HMS Satellite and was British Commissioner in the San Juan Islands boundary dispute also known as The Pig War.

The forest became part of a Municipal Forest established in 1946.

== Access ==
The mountain is open all year except during periods of high fire hazard. Some of the roads have gates and these may be closed at certain times. There are many trails on the mountain, but none were built or are maintained by the municipality of North Cowichan. There are expansive views of the Gulf Islands and Cowichan Valley from the mountain. It has been used as a launching site for hang gliding, complete with a wind sock.

Mount Prevost can be reached from Mt. Prevost Road off Somenos Road. The road to the summit is about 8 kilometres or 20 minutes long.
