= Burgundy (disambiguation) =

Burgundy is a former region of France. The name was from various states that were sometime outside the current borders.

== Places ==
- Kingdom of Burgundy (5th–15th century), a term used for various kingdoms located in historical Burgundy:
  - Kingdom of Burgundy (411–534), an early medieval state founded by the Burgundians
  - Lower Burgundy (879–933), a Burgundian kingdom founded by the Bosonid dynasty
  - Upper Burgundy (888–933), a Burgundian kingdom ruled by the Welf dynasty
  - Kingdom of Burgundy (Arles) (933–15th century), a medieval state, formed from Upper and Lower Burgundy (932), and incorporated into the Holy Roman Empire (1032)
- Duchy of Burgundy (918–1477), a medieval duchy in the Kingdom of France, west of the river Saône
- County of Burgundy (982–1678), a medieval county of the Holy Roman Empire, east of the river Saône
- Landgraviate of Burgundy, a medieval territory in central parts of modern Switzerland
- Burgundian State (1384–1482), domains of the Valois-Burgundy dynasty, including Burgundian lands
- Burgundian Circle, an administrative unit of the Holy Roman Empire (1512–1797)
- Franche-Comté (1678–2016), a former east-Burgundian province and région in France
- Bourgogne-Franche-Comté (2016–present): current Burgundian region in France, formed by the union of Bourgogne and the Franche-Comté

== Other ==
- Burgundy wine, wine from the Burgundy region
- Burgundy (color), a purplish dark-red similar to the color of Burgundy wine
- Burgundy Records, a record label
- Burgundy (stock market), an alternative stock exchange
- Ron Burgundy, a fictional newscaster in the film Anchorman: The Legend of Ron Burgundy
- "Burgundy", a 1999 song by Coal Chamber from their album Chamber Music
- "Burgundy", a 2019 song by Chris Brown from his album Indigo
- "Burgundy", a 2013 song by Earl Sweatshirt from his album Doris
- Eshon Burgundy
- Project Burgund, an abandoned plan developed by Heinrich Himmler to create an SS-run polity roughly corresponding with the lands of the Burgundian State

== See also ==
- Bourgogne (disambiguation)
- Burgoyne (disambiguation)
- Burgundian (disambiguation)
- House of Burgundy (disambiguation)
