= Parker Island =

Island in British Columbia, Canada

Coordinates: 48.884416°N 123.410668°W

A map of Parker Island and the larger Galiano Island

Parker Island is a roughly 400-acre (160 ha) island in the Southern Gulf Islands of British Columbia, Canada. It forms the western side of Montague Harbour, sheltering it from the strong wind gusts of Trincomali Channel. The island may be reached by floatplane, private boat, helicopter or water taxi; there is no public ferry service.

On Parker Island, there is a cable terminal of HVDC Vancouver Island, which is the endpoint of the second overhead line section of HVDC Vancouver Island starting at the east coast of Galiano Island and which reaches Parker Island in a 880-metre (2,890 ft) long span.

Parker Island is named after Lieutenant George Ferdinand Hastings Parker of HMS Ganges, flagship of the Royal Navy's Pacific Station, which was based in Esquimalt.

Parker Island has approximately 25 residents. Half of these residents live there part-time, due to the island's rustic grounds and harsh weather conditions.

== See also ==
- List of islands of British Columbia
