= House of Burgundy (disambiguation) =

The House of Burgundy was a cadet branch of the Capetian royal family that ruled the Duchy of Burgundy from 1032 until 1361.

House of Burgundy may also refer to:

- Anscarids, ruling house of the County of Burgundy (982–1190)
- Castilian House of Burgundy, an Anscarid cadet branch, ruling house of the Kingdoms of Castile and León (1126–1369)
- Portuguese House of Burgundy, a cadet branch of the Capetian House of Burgundy, ruling house of the Kingdom of Portugal (1093–1383)
- House of Valois-Burgundy, a Valois cadet branch, ruling house of the Duchy of Burgundy (1363–1482)

== See also ==
- Burgundian (disambiguation)
- Burgundy (disambiguation)
