= Trincomali Channel =

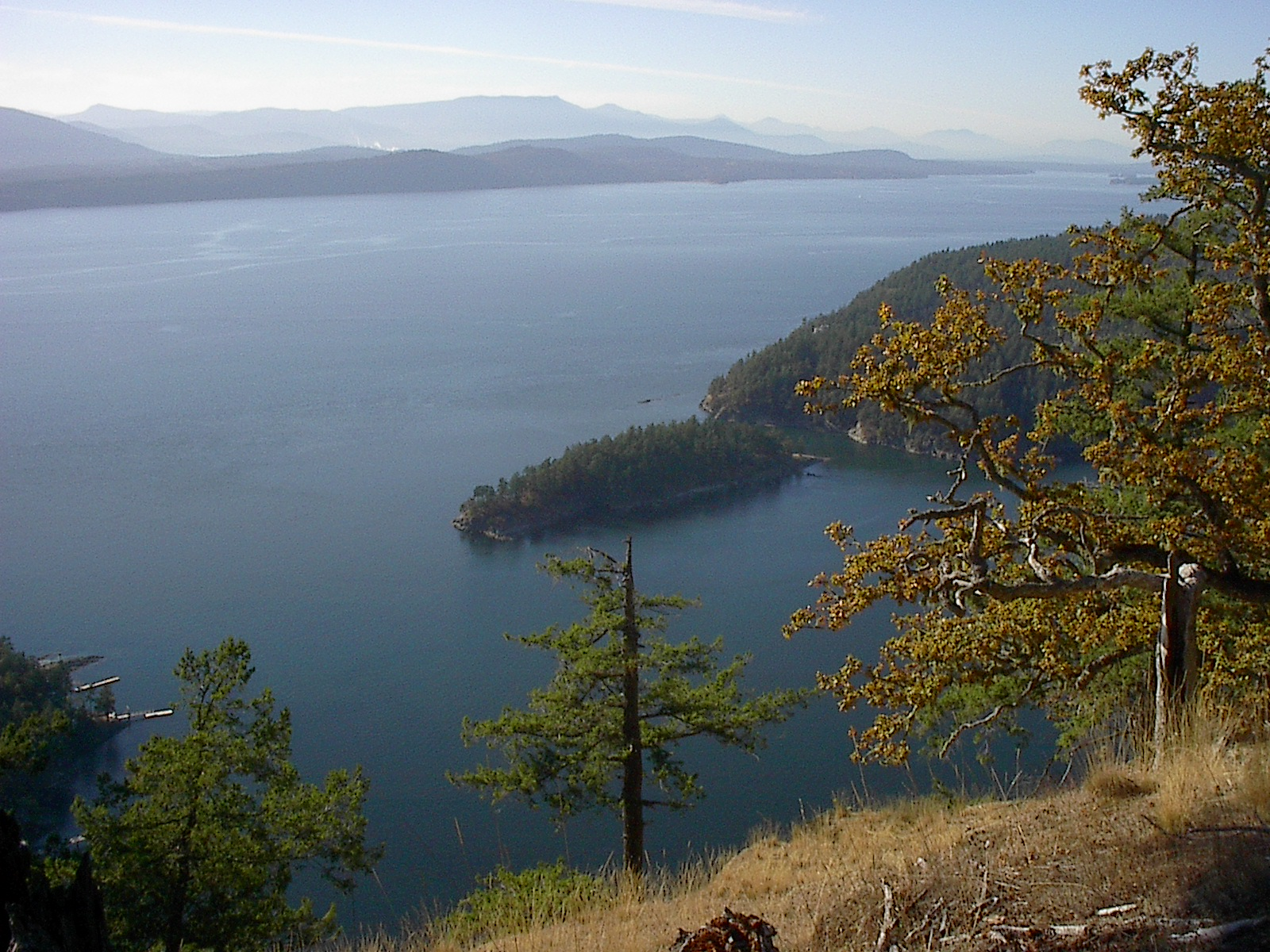
- Looking up Trincomali Channel from Sutil Mountain on Galiano Island

- Location within British Columbia

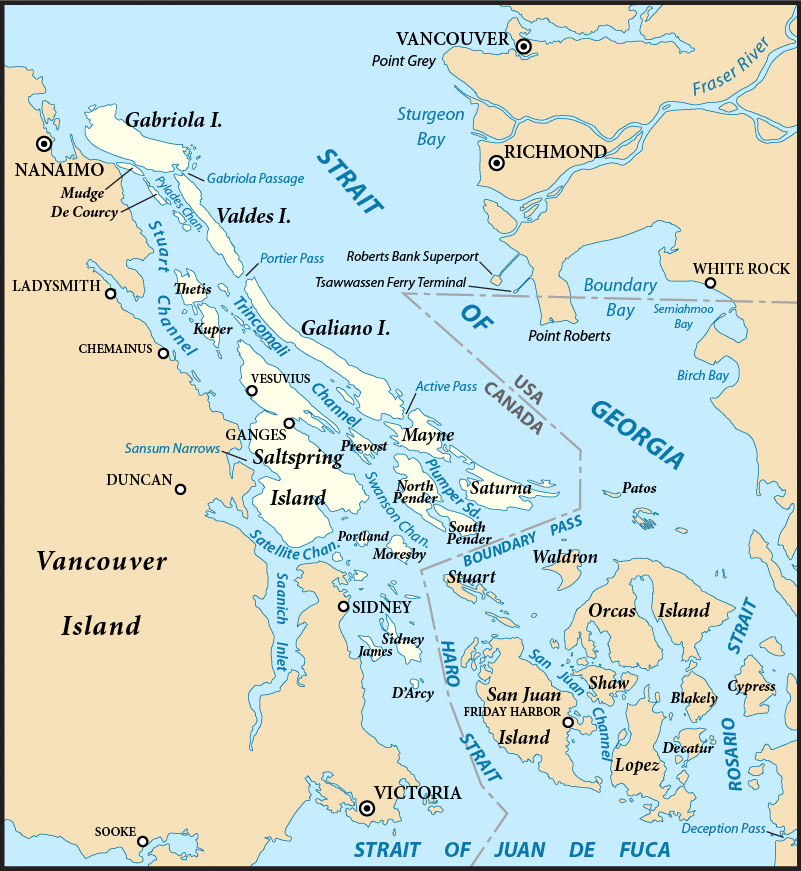
- Map of the Southern Gulf Islands showing Trincomali Channel (centre left)
- Location: Southern Gulf Islands, British Columbia, Canada
- Coordinates: 48°58′00″N 123°35′00″W
- Type: Channel
- Part of: Salish Sea
- Max. length: 34 kilometres (21 mi)
- Max. width: 5 kilometres (3.1 mi)

Trincomali Channel is a channel between Galiano Island and Saltspring Island in the Gulf Islands of British Columbia, Canada.

== Etymology ==
Trincomali Channel is named for the ship HMS Trincomalee, which was assigned to the Royal Navy's Pacific Station at Esquimalt from 1852 to 1856.

== Geography ==
Trincomali Channel is located between Pylades Island to the north; Thetis, Penelakut, and Salt Spring Islands to the west; Valdes and Galiano Islands to the east; and Prevost Island to the south. Active Pass and Porlier Pass link the channel to the Strait of Georgia at the south and north ends of Galiano Island, respectively.

The channel contains several islands, the largest being Parker Island located southwest of Galiano Island.

== See also ==
- Active Pass
- Sansum Narrows
