= Burgundian =

Burgundian can refer to any of the following:

- Someone or something from Burgundy.
- Burgundians, an East Germanic tribe, who first appear in history in South East Europe. Later Burgundians colonised the area of Gaul that is now known as Burgundy (French Bourgogne)
- The Old Burgundian language (Germanic), an East Germanic language spoken by the Burgundians
- The Modern Burgundian language (Oïl), an Oïl language also known as Bourguignon spoken in the region of Burgundy, France.
- Frainc-Comtou dialect, sometimes regarded as part of the Burgundian group of languages
- Burgundian (party), a political faction in early 15th century during the Hundred Years' War
- Kingdom of the Burgundians (411–534), an early medieval state founded by the Burgundians
- Burgundian Netherlands (1384–1482), the parts of the Duchy of Burgundy that correspond to the Low Countries

== See also ==
- Burgundian War (disambiguation)
- Burgundy (disambiguation)
- Bourgogne (disambiguation)
