= Canoe Island =

Canoe Island can refer to:

- Canoe Island (Nova Scotia)
- Canoe Island (Ontario)
- Canoe Island (Washington)
