= Prevost Island =

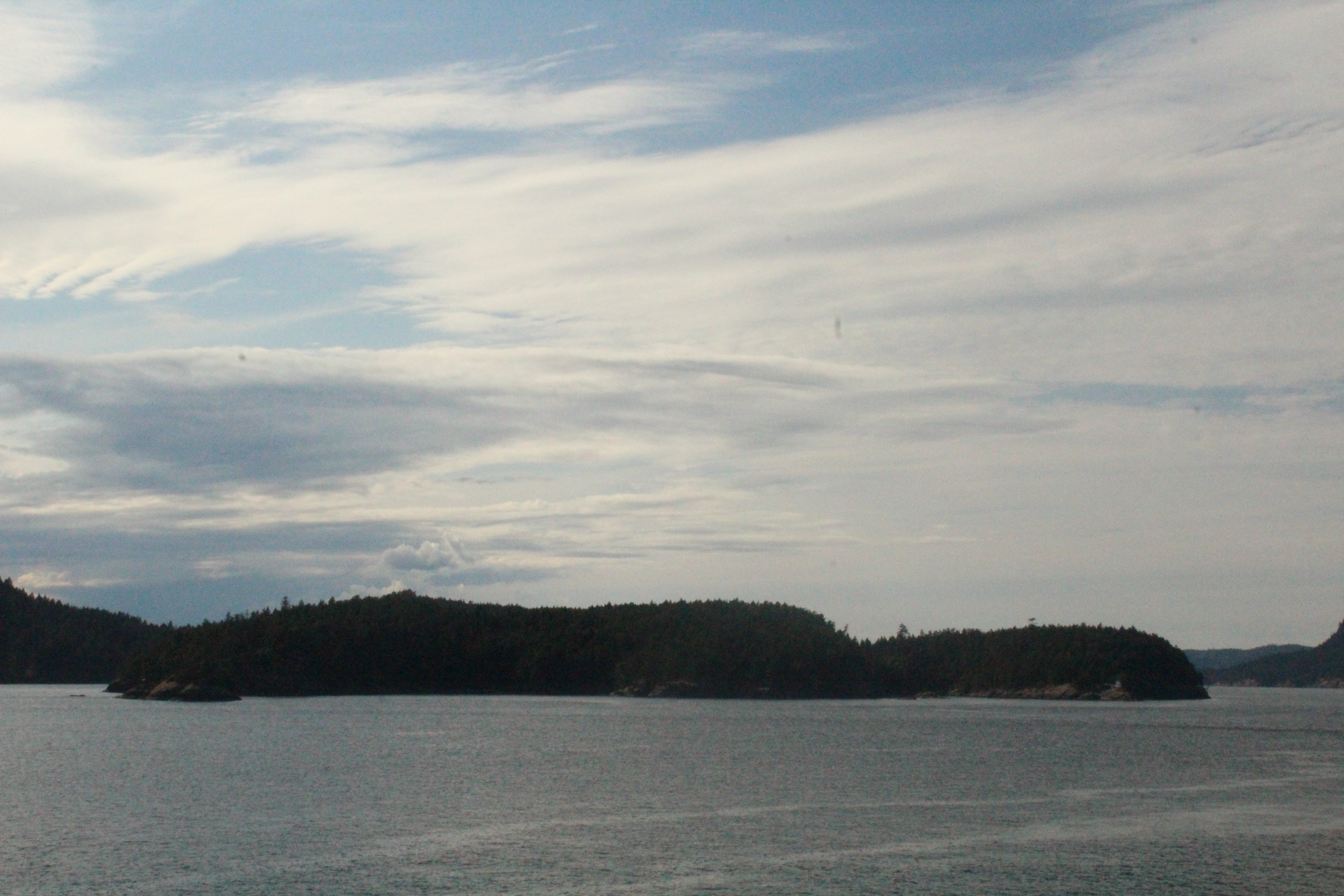

- Location of Prevost Island in British Columbia
- Coordinates: 48°50′00″N 123°23′00″W
- Country: Canada
- Province: British Columbia

Area
  - Total: 6.75 km^{2} (2.61 sq mi)

Prevost Island is an island in the southern Gulf Islands of the South Coast of British Columbia, Canada, located east of Ganges Harbour and midway between the southeastern extremity of Salt Spring Island (W) and the southern end of Galiano Island (E). The island was named for James Charles Prevost, who was British Commissioner for the San Juan Island boundary dispute of 1859-1870 and captain of HMS Satellite. Prevost Harbor on nearby Stuart Island, Washington is also named after Prevost and Satellite Island, within Prevost Harbor, is named after his ship. The Satellite played a critical role in the Lamalcha War in the same area in 1863.

Most of the island was bought as a farm in the 1920s by Digby de Burgh, an Irishman from County Limerick, who used it to raise sheep, goats and cattle. His descendants still own much of the island, which is still primarily a sheep and cattle farm. A few smaller private homes were built on the northwest side of the island.

== Gulf Islands National Park Reserve ==
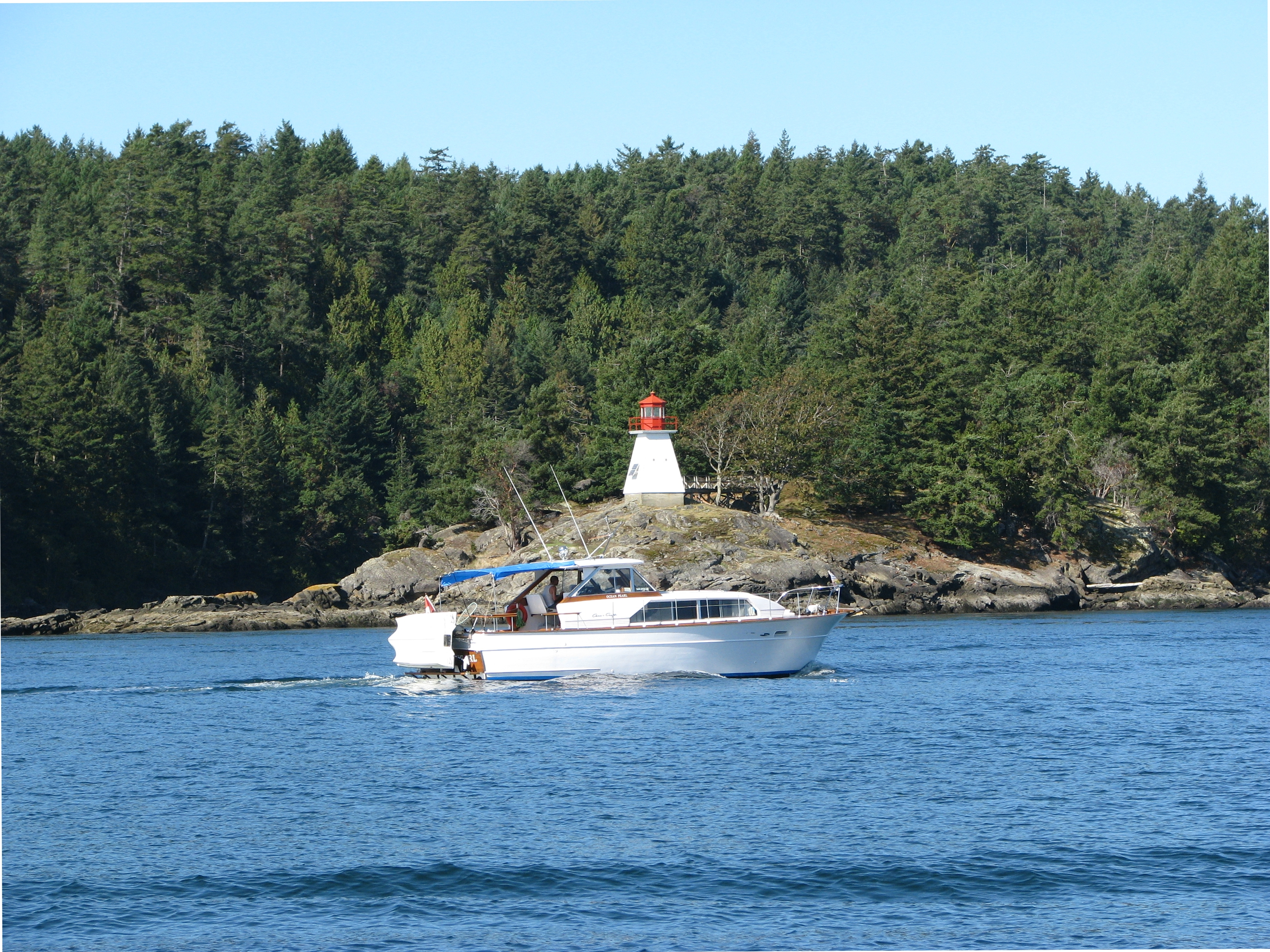
Portlock Point Lighthouse

James Bay (also named for Captain Prevost) is a part of Gulf Islands National Park Reserve (GINPR). There are 10 marine-accessible backcountry campsites available at James Bay. Facilities are limited to pit toilets; no campfires are permitted. The Current Map and Hiking and Camping Information brochure on the GINPR website provides updated camping fee information . Boaters will find good anchorage at Selby Cove, and paddlers can land at James Bay beach.

== The Portlock Point Lighthouse ==
The Portlock Point Lighthouse, on the eastern extremity of the island, was built in 1895. It replaced a stake lighthouse built five years earlier. The light was automated in the late 1960s and rebuilt in 1987. Portlock Point is now a part of Gulf Islands National Park Reserve.
