= Hugh Burgoyne =

Captain Hugh Burgoyne VC
- Captain Hugh Talbot Burgoyne, VC RN
- Born: 17 July 1833; Dublin, Ireland
- Died: 7 September 1870 (aged 37); Cape Finisterre
- Burial place: Brompton Cemetery
- Military career
- Allegiance: United Kingdom
- Branch: Royal Navy
- Rank: Captain
- Commands: HMS Captain
- Conflicts: Crimean War
- Awards: Victoria Cross

Captain Hugh Talbot Burgoyne VC (17 July 1833 – 7 September 1870) was an Irish recipient of the Victoria Cross. Born in Dublin, he was the son of John Fox Burgoyne and the grandson of John Burgoyne.

Burgoyne was a 21-year-old Royal Navy lieutenant, serving in the Crimean War when he performed the deed for which he was awarded the VC.

== Details ==
On 29 May 1855, in the Sea of Azov, Crimea, Lieutenant Burgoyne of HMS Swallow, with Lieutenant Cecil William Buckley from HMS Miranda and Gunner John Robarts from HMS Ardent, volunteered to land at a beach where the Russian army were in strength. They were out of covering gunshot range of the ships offshore and met considerable enemy opposition, but managed to set fire to corn stores and ammunition dumps and destroy enemy equipment before embarking again.

Burgoyne was Commander on HMS Ganges under Captain John Fulford during that vessel's service in the waters of the Colonies of Vancouver Island and British Columbia during the fledgling years of the latter colony's establishment. "When the American merchant ship Northern Eagle was burned in Esquimalt Harbour, Captain Burgoyne was highly commended for his efforts to save everything possible from the burning ship. Seamen from the Ganges, Pylades, Tribune, and Plumper also assisted."

== Later career ==
Burgoyne later achieved the rank of captain and was killed when in command of HMS Captain, which capsized off Cape Finisterre during a gale on 7 September 1870. This revolutionary masted turret ship had been the subject of considerable controversy during its design and construction and its loss was attributed to its poor stability.

Lost at sea, Burgoyne and his father (Field Marshal Sir John Fox Burgoyne, buried at the Tower of London) are memorialised in Brompton Cemetery, London, at the Burgoyne family plot against the wall, towards the north-east corner of the cemetery.

== Legacy ==
Burgoyne Bay in British Columbia was named after him in 1859.

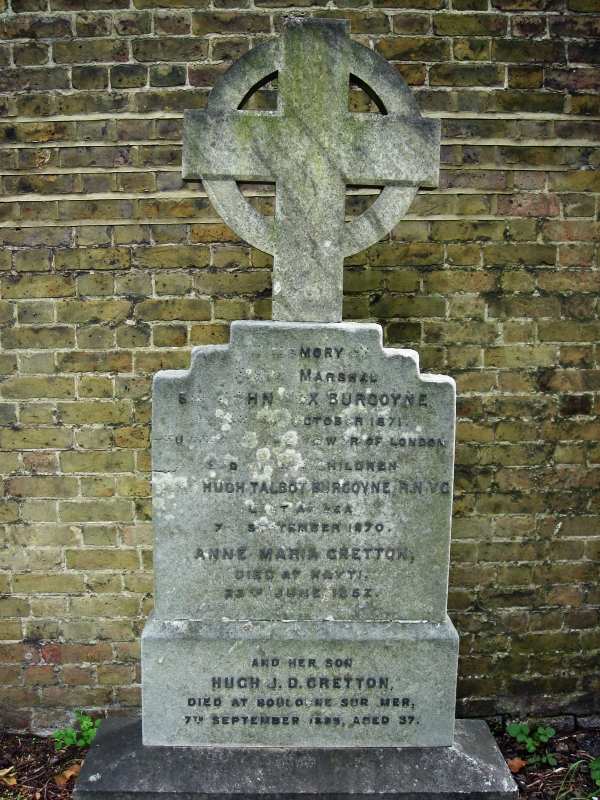
Funerary monument, Brompton Cemetery, London

St. Paul’s Cathedral, London houses a memorial to Burgoyne and the officers, marines, men and boys who perished off the Spanish coast.
