= Canoe Island (Washington) =

Island in the U.S. state of Washington

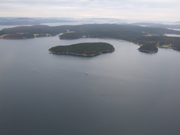
- Aerial view of Canoe Island.

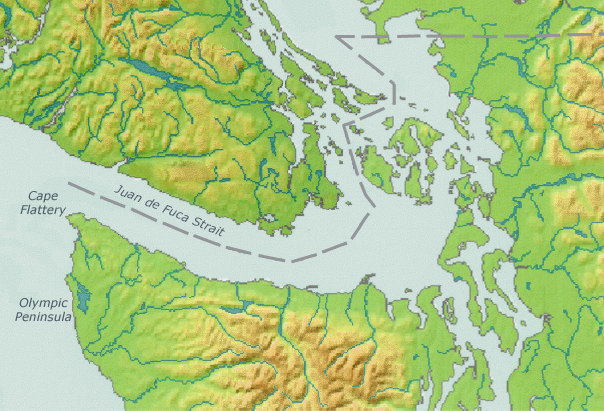
- Location within Strait of Juan de Fuca Location within Washington (state)

Geography
- Location: Pacific Northwest
- Coordinates: 48.556082°N 122.927495°W
- Archipelago: San Juan Islands
- Area: 47 acres (19 ha)
- Highest elevation: 127.7 ft (38.92 m)
- Highest point: Mount Austin

Administration
- United States
- State: Washington
- County: San Juan County

Demographics
- Population: 5 humans, 1 Australian Shepherd, 23 hens, 1 rooster, 2 bucks

Canoe Island is a 47-acre (19-hectare) island located in the center of the San Juan Islands, an archipelago in the U.S. state of Washington. The island is situated in Upright Channel between Shaw and Lopez Islands. Canoe Island's surface is mostly forested with second-growth cedar, fir, hemlock, and madrona, with some old-growth trees, too. Its maximum elevation is 127.7 feet (38.9 metres). The rocky shoreline is bordered by dense forests of bull kelp.

While Canoe Island is only accessible by boat, several Washington State Ferry routes pass between the southern tip of the island and Flat Point on Lopez Island, docking at Friday Harbor, and Lopez Ferry Landing. Canoe Island is privately owned by Canoe Island French Camp, a 501(c)(3) nonprofit that runs an overnight summer camp for children.

== History ==
=== Indigenous Presence ===
Prior to European settlement, Canoe Island may have been occupied or visited by Indigenous Coast Salish peoples. Specifically, Canoe Island may have been part of the territory of the Lhaq'temish (Lummi), Tulalip, S'Klallam, and Samish Nations. The Samish name for the island is Skwsá7 snéxwlh. The island has several shell middens from this era.

=== Early European Exploration ===
The name Canoe Island first appears on the British Admiralty Chart 2840, Richards, 1858–1860. Additional surveys by Captain George Henry in the 1850s and 1860s describe the channel surrounding Canoe Island as a safe passage with mild tides.

=== Military Reserve ===
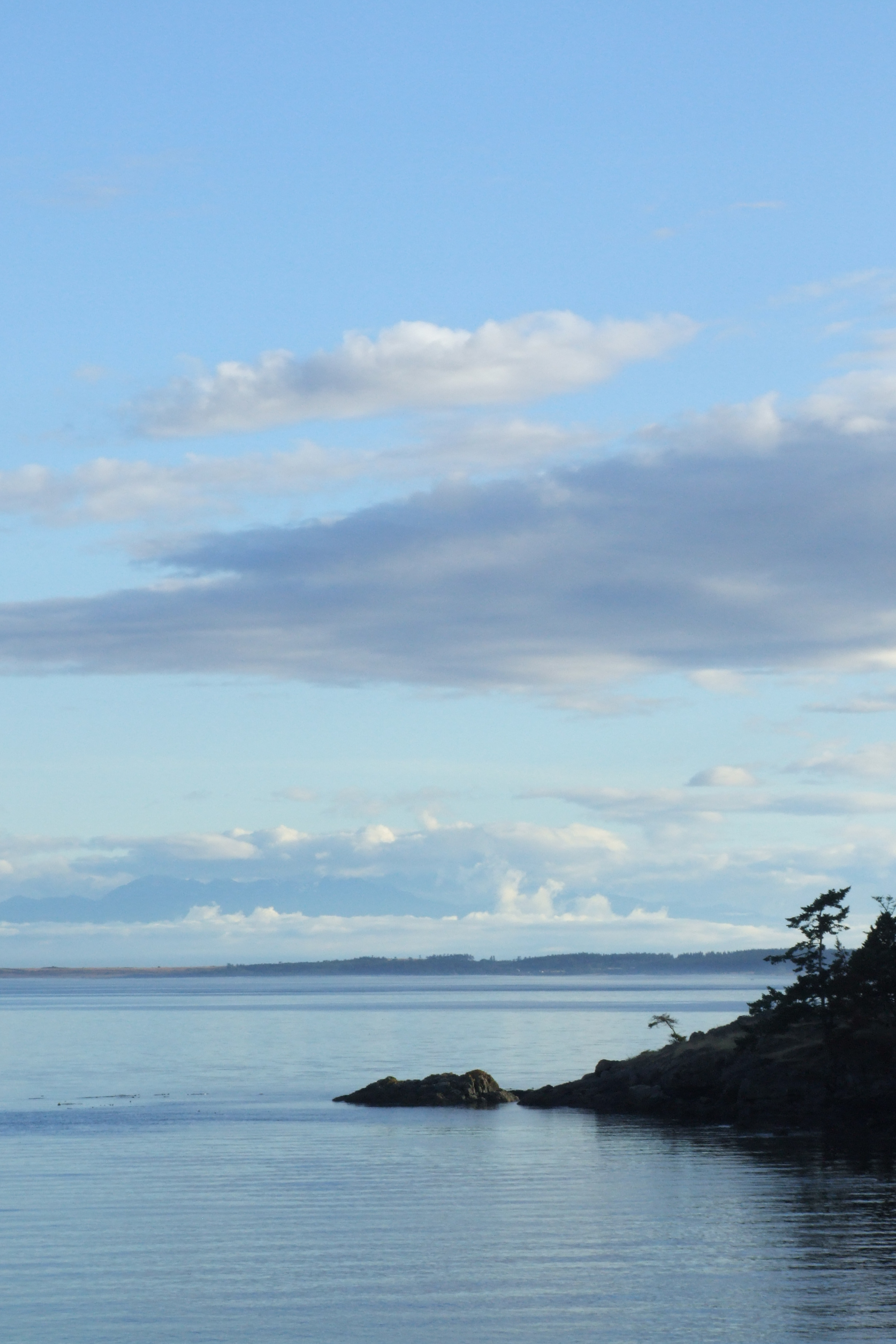
Canoe Island coastline.

In 1872, the San Juan Islands were declared property of the U.S. following the Pig War. Shortly thereafter, the U.S. government sent a team of Army Engineers under the command of General Nathaniel Michler to determine the most favorable sites for military fortifications within the San Juan Islands. By September 1874, Michler and his team had selected the locations of seven large government military reservations, one of which was located on Canoe Island. The other reserves were located on San Juan, Lopez, and Shaw Islands.

In 1902, the San Juan Islander critiqued this use of land for military purposes, arguing that less than 1/10th of the land in military reserves would ever be needed by the U.S. government. It's unclear exactly why these reserves were so large, though it's possible that the government overestimated the value of the islands for military defense. The San Juan Islander also reported that the military reserves presented a barrier to settlement in the county.

During this era, individuals could obtain leases of the military reservations in the archipelago. In 1898, I. J. Lichtenberg obtained the lease of Canoe Island for $1, with the stipulation that he be prepared to leave the reserve at any time the government deemed it necessary for military operations. Lichtenberg also held the lease for the military reservation on the North end of Lopez Island.

Ultimately, the military reserves in the San Juan Islands were never used; artillery was never mounted on the sites, no military buildings were constructed, nor were troops ever housed on the reserves.

=== 1913 Manhunt ===
In 1913, Canoe Island briefly became the location of a manhunt that involved a criminal chase across multiple islands.

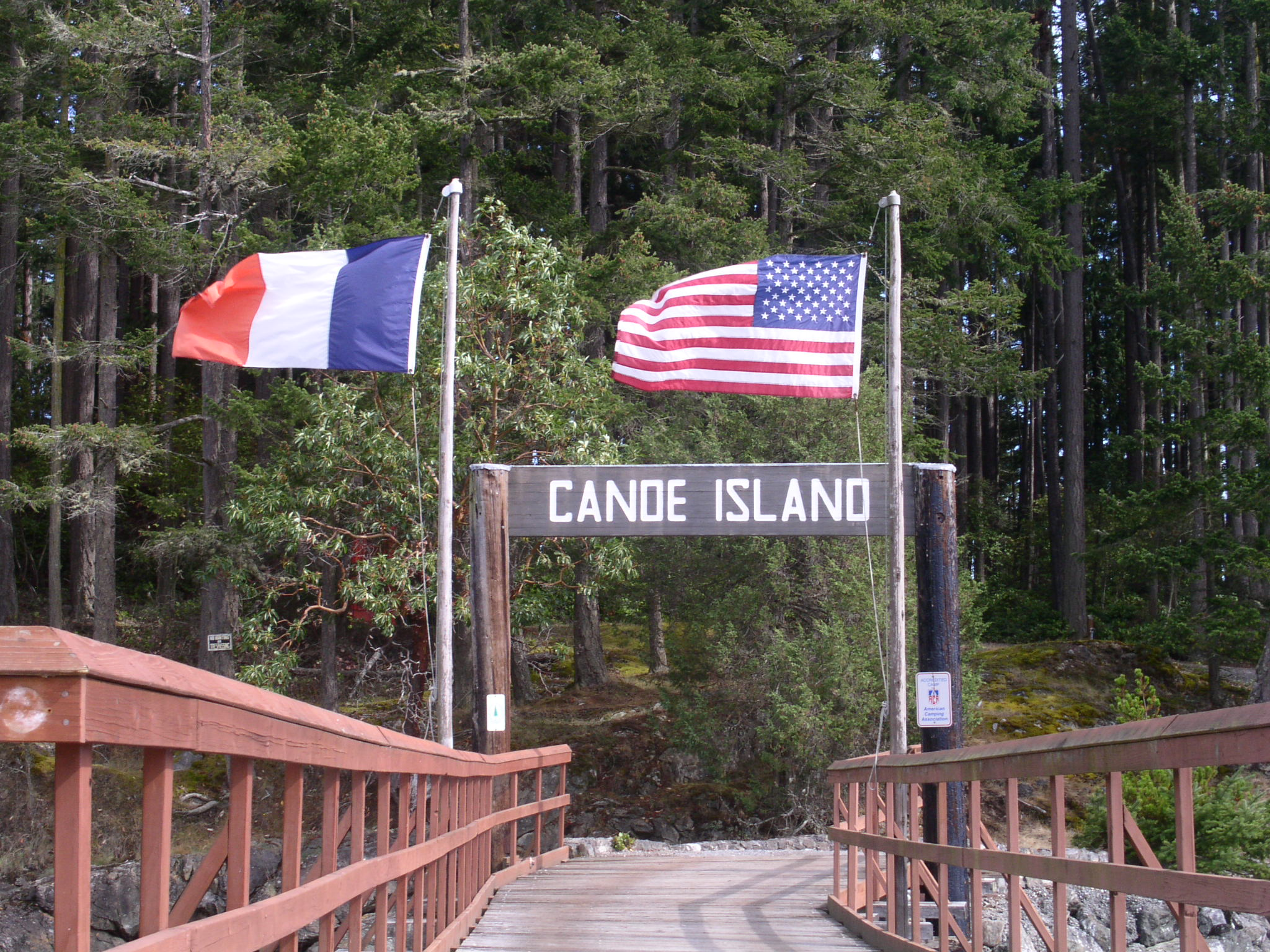
Welcome sign on Canoe Island.

The search began on Orcas, where two men arrived by skiff before boarding a ship for Bellingham. When their boat was found adrift, a search turned up a pocketbook with several documents related to bank robberies and other crimes committed in Canada. The sheriff and deputy summoned the British authorities, who confirmed that the two men were wanted for several crimes.

A few days later, one of the men returned to Orcas Island seeking his pocketbook on the boat. The sheriff was notified of man's return and a shootout on the porch of the Orcas Hotel ensued. The criminal escaped to the woods and later that night he escaped unharmed from an additional exchange of shots.

The following morning, the criminal, under the disguise of a carefree fisherman, stole a boat and departed for Shaw Island. The man ate breakfast there before stealing another boat to escape Shaw. This boat was later found on Canoe Island, though the outlaw was nowhere to be found.

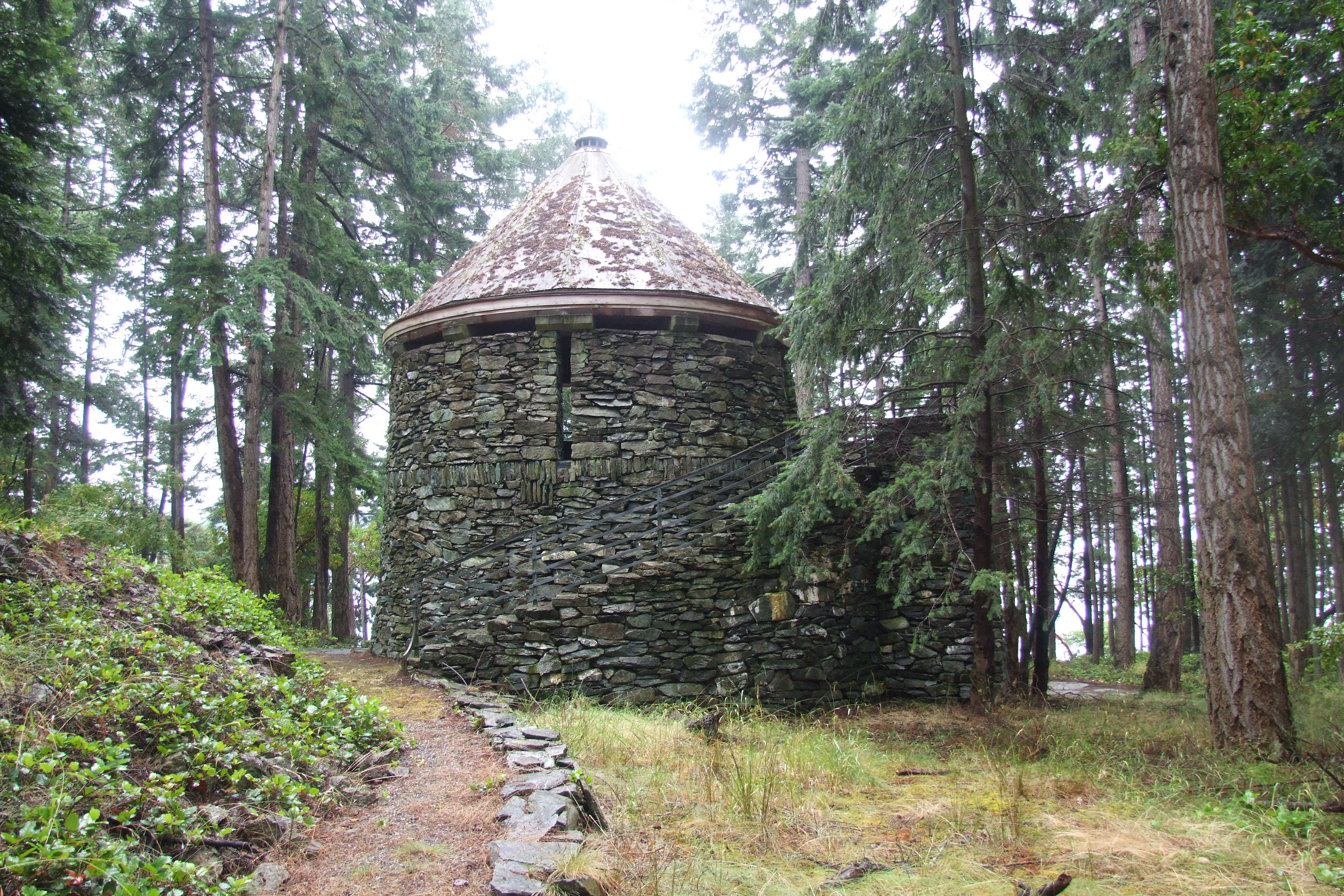
Le Colombier, Canoe Island.

In the following days, rumors spread that the man was eating his meals on Shaw. The authorities failed to capture the man despite a $1500 reward, though his camp on Shaw was found and it contained bloody bandages. The sheriff and Canadian authorities eventually gave up after a two-week search, believing that the man was still hiding on Shaw and receiving help from local residents.

=== French Camp ===
In 1965, Dr. Warren and Florence Heath “Bunny” Horton Austin purchased Canoe Island for $95,000. Bunny Austin was the daughter of Horace E. Horton, founder of the Chicago Bridge & Iron Company. Three years after purchasing the island, the Austins established the “Institut Francile” and Canoe Island Camps, Inc. with help from Le Lycée Francais de Los Angeles. At first, the camp operated on Orcas Island at the Madrona Inn in Eastsound.

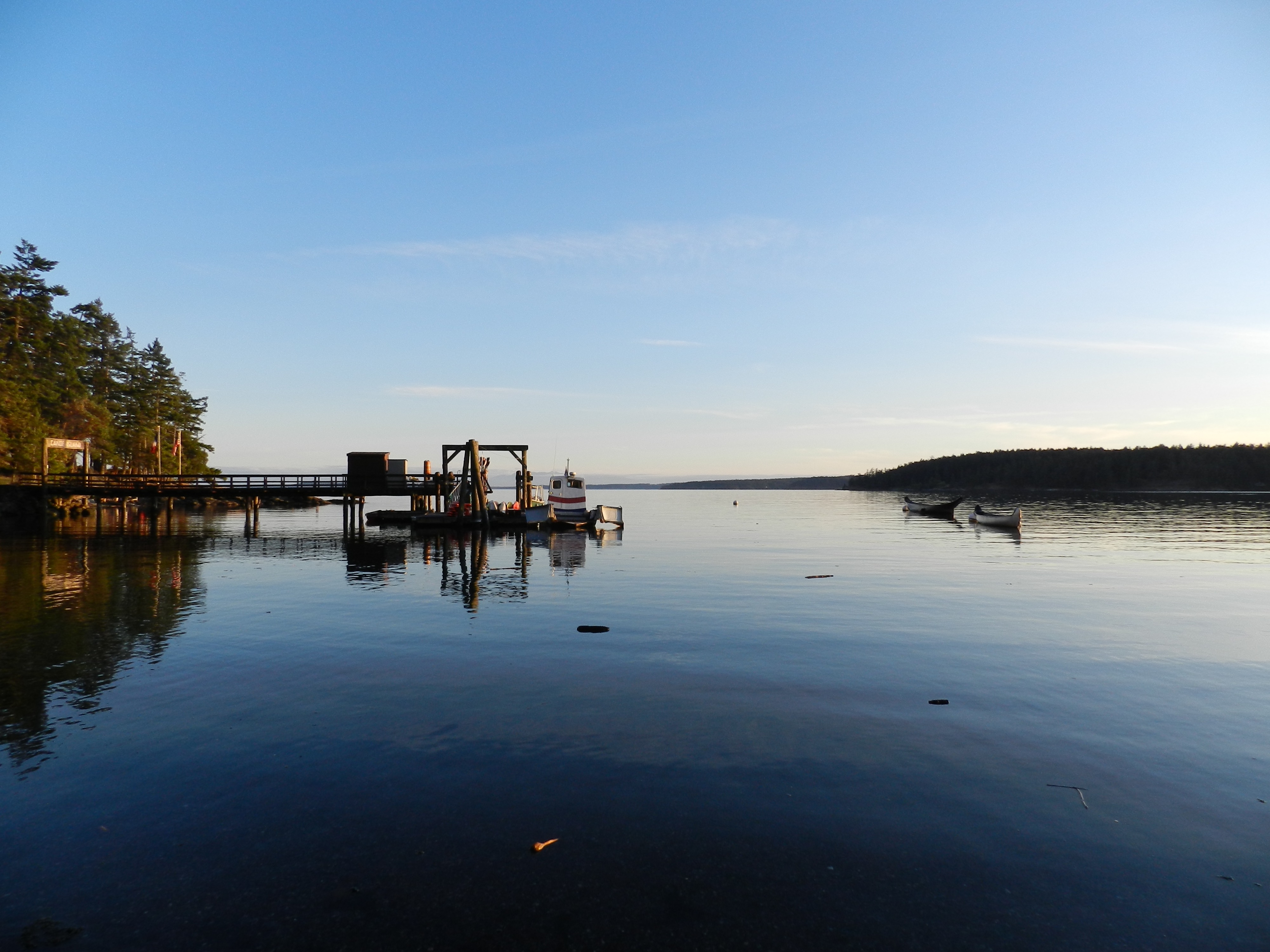
Dock on Canoe Island.

The Austins chose to establish a French camp because no other French camp existed on the West coast at the time, and they sought to create one for their daughter, Dorothy Austin. Dr. Austin held a deep appreciation for French language and culture that sparked when he was a child. He also served in France with General Patton's Third Army in the 49th Field Hospital during World War II.

The Austins continued to hold the camp on Orcas while developing buildings and infrastructure on Canoe Island. Architect Paul Gray of California oversaw the building plans. When the buildings were completed in 1975, all camp operations moved to Canoe Island. Canoe Island is the site of the first British telephone box in the San Juans; another was later placed on San Juan Island.

In 1992, Dr. Austin established the camp as a 501(c)(3) non-profit and renamed the organization Canoe Island French Camp. This change also established a board of directors, who continue to run the camp today in conjunction with the camp directors.

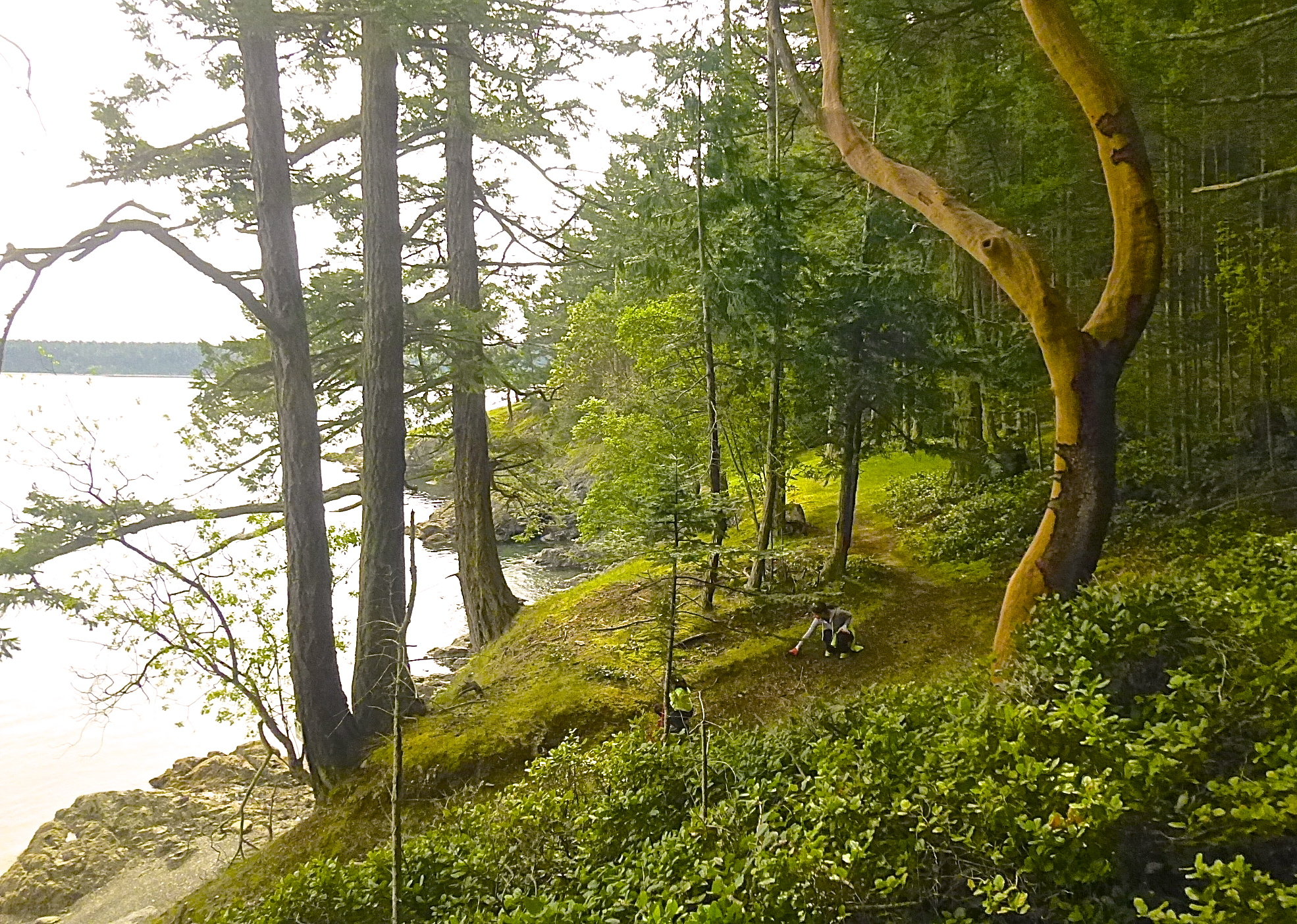
Canoe Island trail.

== Canoe Island French Camp ==
Currently, the camp hosts approximately 200 children each summer and also offers school and family programs. Its programming focuses on French language instruction, French cultural activities, and outdoor education. Campers participate in activities such as art, archery, fencing, kayaking, and theater alongside language classes.

Canoe Island French Camp is one of several overnight camps for children in the San Juan Islands, including YMCA Camp Orkila, Camp Nor’Wester, and Camp Four Winds Westward Ho. The camp is accredited by the American Camp Association and is a member of the Western Association of Independent Camps.

== In fiction ==
Canoe Island is a locale in the novel, The Boy Book: A Study of Habits and Behaviors, Plus Techniques for Taming Them. The fictional story follows a teenager growing of age using life experiences, including those drawn from a visit to Canoe Island.
