= Burgundian War =

Burgundian War may refer to:

- Burgundian Wars (1474-77)
- Cologne Diocesan Feud (1473-80)
- Armagnac–Burgundian Civil War (1407-35)
