= Bourgogne (disambiguation) =

Bourgogne is the French name of Burgundy, one of the 26 regions of France.

Bourgogne may also refer to:

== Places ==
- Bourgogne, Marne, a commune of the Marne department in northeastern France
- Bourgogne (Casablanca), a quartier of Casablanca, Morocco
- Duchy of Burgundy, a historical French duchy situated in eastern France and parts of modern-day Belgium

== Ships ==
- French ship Bourgogne (1766), a 74-gun ship of the line of the French Navy
- French ship Duc de Bourgogne (1751), an 80-gun ship of the line of the French Navy
- SS La Bourgogne, a French ocean liner, which sank in 1898
- French submarine Casabianca (S603), formerly the Bourgogne

== Wine grapes ==
Several wine grapes have gone by the name of Bourgogne including:

- Canari noir
- Enfariné noir
- Melon de Bourgogne
- Négrette

== See also ==
- Burgoyne (disambiguation)
- Burgundy (disambiguation)
