= HMS Brave (J305) =

Algerine-class minesweeper

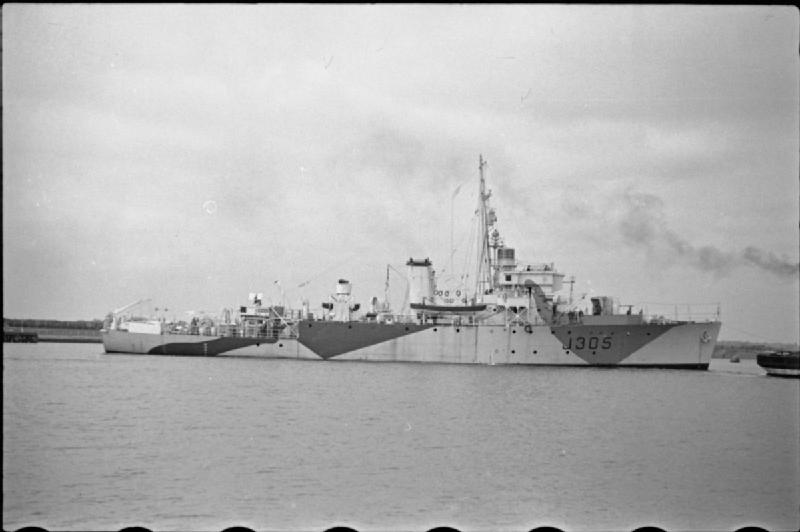
- HMS Brave

History

United Kingdom
- Name: Brave
- Namesake: Brave
- Ordered: 20 May 1941
- Builder: Blyth Shipbuilding Company, Northumberland
- Laid down: 23 April 1942
- Launched: 4 February 1943
- Commissioned: 3 August 1943
- Decommissioned: 1946
- Recommissioned: 1951
- Decommissioned: 1957
- Renamed: Satellite
- Namesake: Satellite
- Identification: Pennant number: J305
- Fate: Scrapped, 1957

General characteristics
- Class & type: Algerine-class minesweeper
- Displacement: 850 long tons (864 t) (standard); 1,125 long tons (1,143 t) (deep)
- Length: 225 ft (69 m) o/a
- Beam: 35 ft 6 in (10.82 m)
- Draught: 11 ft 6 in (3.51 m)
- Installed power: 2 × Admiralty 3-drum boilers; 2,000 ihp (1,500 kW)
- Propulsion: 2 shafts; 2 × Parsons geared steam turbines
- Speed: 16.5 knots (30.6 km/h; 19.0 mph)
- Range: 5,000 nmi (9,300 km; 5,800 mi) at 10 knots (19 km/h; 12 mph)
- Complement: 85
- Armament: 1 × QF 4 in (102 mm) Mk V anti-aircraft gun; 4 × twin Oerlikon 20 mm cannon

HMS Brave (J305) was a steam turbine-powered Algerine-class minesweeper during the Second World War.

== Design and description ==
The turbine-powered ships displaced 850 long tons (860 t) at standard load and 1,125 long tons (1,143 t) at deep load. The ships measured 225 feet (68.6 m) long overall with a beam of 35 feet 6 inches (10.8 m). The turbine group had a draught of 11 feet (3.4 m). The ships' complement consisted of 85 officers and ratings.

The ships had two Parsons geared steam turbines, each driving one shaft, using steam provided by two Admiralty three-drum boilers. The engines produced a total of 2,000 indicated horsepower (1,500 kW) and gave a maximum speed of 16.5 knots (30.6 km/h; 19.0 mph). They carried a maximum of 660 long tons (671 t) of fuel oil that gave them a range of 5,000 nautical miles (9,300 km; 5,800 mi) at 10 knots (19 km/h; 12 mph).

The Algerine class was armed with a QF 4 in (102 mm) Mk V anti-aircraft gun and four twin-gun mounts for Oerlikon 20 mm cannon. The latter guns were in short supply when the first ships were being completed and they often got a proportion of single mounts. By 1944, single-barrel Bofors 40 mm mounts began replacing the twin 20 mm mounts on a one for one basis. All of the ships were fitted for four throwers and two rails for depth charges.

== Construction and career ==
The ship was ordered on 20 May 1941 at the Blyth Shipbuilding Company at Northumberland, England. She was laid down on 23 April 1942 and launched on 4 February 1943. The ship was commissioned on 3 August 1943.

on 14 January 1944, she took part in the Operation Shingle until the 26th of the same month. On 16 June, the ship and her flotilla was deployed in advance of ships on passage to carry out Operation Brassard. In July, they were deployed in the joint minesweeping operations off Civitavecchia to clear a channel north of Cape Corso also known as Operation Lobster. In August, she took part in the Operation Dragoon.

On 14 July 1944, the ship took part in operation to clear a channel to Port of Leghorn with ships of the 19th and 13th Minesweeping Flotilla during Operation Lobster. In October, she was nominated for minesweeping service with her Flotilla in support of the Operation Manna.

The ship returned to the UK in May 1946 and was put into the reserve fleet.

In 1951, Brave was towed into the River Tyne to take over the duties as Drill Ship of the Tyne Division R.N.V.R. from HMS Melita. As a drill ship, she was given the name Satellite. The ship ran aground on the Black Middens on the North side of the river but was able to be towed out. The damage she sustained were too extensive to be repaired conventionally. Moreover, she had concrete poured at her lower hull during her conversion at the Tyne Dock, thus she had problems with her watertight integrity.

In 1957, she was sold to BISCO for scrap by the Clayton and Davies at Dunston in which she arrived on 25 November of the same year.

== Bibliography ==
- Chesneau, Roger, ed. (1980). Conway's All the World's Fighting Ships 1922–1946. Greenwich, UK: Conway Maritime Press. ISBN 0-85177-146-7.
- Colledge, J. J.; Warlow, Ben (2006) [1969]. Ships of the Royal Navy: The Complete Record of All Fighting Ships of the Royal Navy from the 15th Century to the Present (3rd Rev ed.). London: Chatham Publishing. ISBN 978-1-86176-281-8. OCLC 67375475.
- Elliott, Peter (1977). Allied Escort Ships of World War II: A complete survey. London: Macdonald and Jane's. ISBN 0-356-08401-9.
- Lenton, H. T. (1998). British & Empire Warships of the Second World War. Annapolis, Maryland: Naval Institute Press. ISBN 1-55750-048-7.
