= James Charles Prevost =

Royal Navy Admiral (1810–1891)

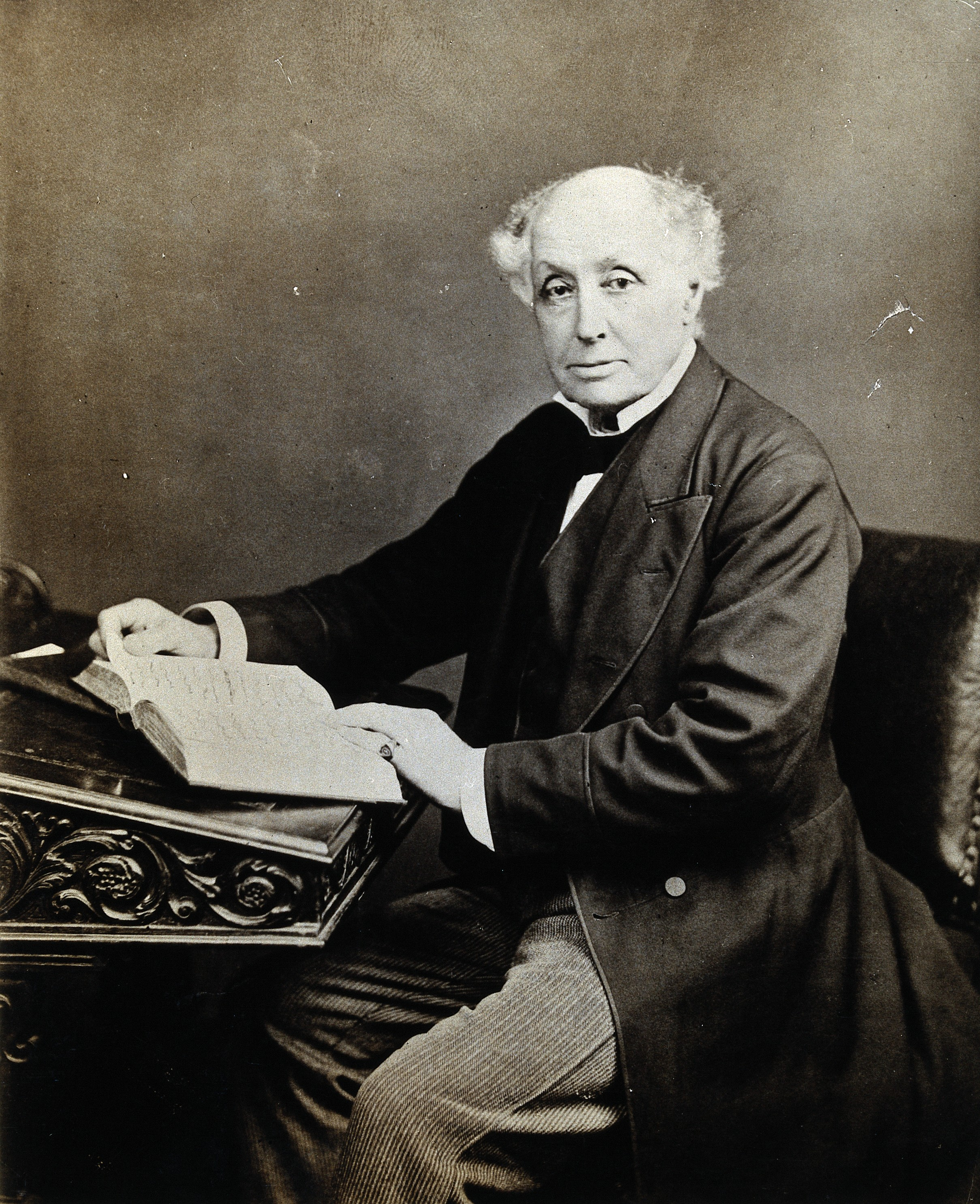
Portrait of Admiral Prevost. Credit: Wellcome Collection

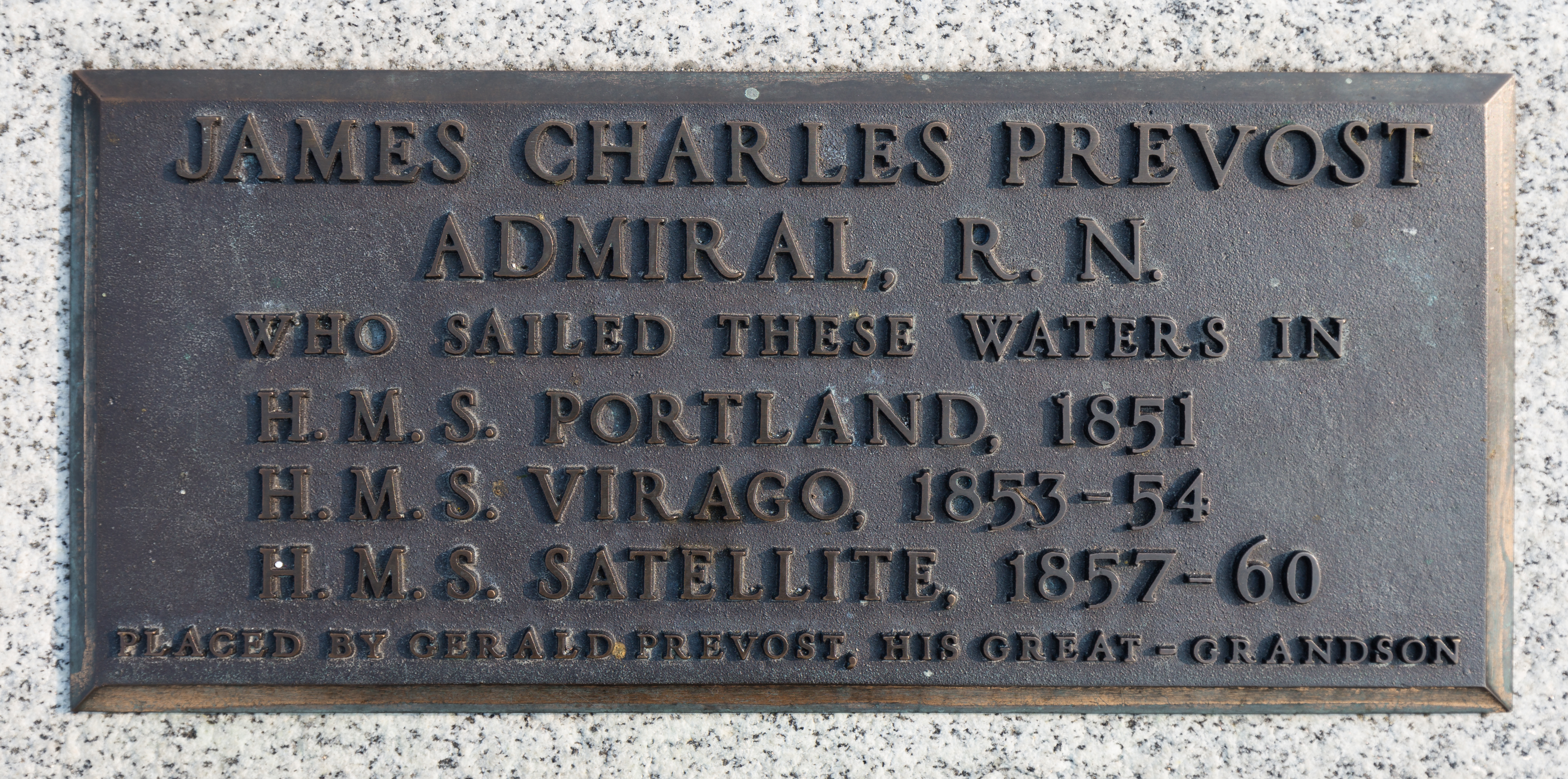
Plaque dedicated to Prevost in Victoria Harbour, British Columbia, Canada

James Charles Prevost (1810–1891) was an admiral in the Royal Navy.

He was born in Bedhampton, Hampshire, England, the son of Rear-Admiral James Prevost and his first wife Frances née Haultain, and grandson of George Prevost. He joined the Royal Navy as a midshipman in 1823 and passed his lieutenant's examination six years later. However there were few available commands for a new lieutenant, and Prevost was not formally commissioned at that rank until 10 December 1835. On 30 December he received his first officer's posting as "additional lieutenant" aboard the 120-gun first rate HMS Caledonia, at the time the flagship of Admiral Josias Rowley in the British Mediterranean Fleet. In May 1836 Prevost was transferred to the 74-gun HMS Pembroke for service off Lisbon and the Mediterranean. He was still with Pembroke when she was driven ashore at Gibraltar in March 1837.

Pembroke's crew were paid off in 1840 and Prevost was transferred as senior lieutenant to HMS Victor, an ageing 18-gun brig-sloop attached to a flotilla bound for the West Indies. Returning to England in 1842, he married Ellen Mary Moresby, daughter of Rear Admiral Sir Fairfax Moresby in October of that year. Thereafter he prolonged his stay in London via a sinecure appointment as Flag Lieutenant to Admiral Sir Charles Rowley who was serving as Commander-in-Chief, Portsmouth. Prevost was promoted to commander in October 1844. Automatic advancement on seniority saw him promoted to admiral in 1880. In later life he served Commissioner for Britain in negotiations to settle the San Juan Island boundary dispute between British Columbia and the United States. Prevost died in London in 1891.

Prevost had five children: Ellen (born 1843), James (1846–1920), Annette (1849–1916), George (1851–1940), and Edward (born 1855). He was grandfather of General Sir Reginald Hildyard via his daughter Annette. Prevost Island in the Gulf Islands of British Columbia and other names on it, or nearby, e.g. James Bay and Charles Rocks, were named after him. Also a Swatch by Earnshaw in limited Edition of 300 Pieces and Mount Prevost, near Duncan, and Prevost Hill, a landmark on Ten Mile Point at Cadboro Bay, British Columbia are also named for him.
