= HMS Satellite =

Eight ships of the Royal Navy have borne the name HMS Satellite:

- HMS Satellite (1806) was a 16-gun brig-sloop launched in 1806. She foundered in 1810.
- HMS Satellite (1812) was an 18-gun Cruizer-class brig-sloop launched in 1812 and sold in 1824.
- HMS Satellite (1826) was an 18-gun sloop launched in 1826 and broken up in 1849.
- HMS Satellite (1840) was a paddle gunboat launched in 1840 and listed until 1860.
- HMS Satellite (1855) was a wooden Pearl-class screw corvette launched in 1855 and broken up in 1879.
- HMS Satellite (1881) was a Satellite-class composite screw corvette launched in 1881. She was used as a drill ship for the Royal Naval Reserve from 1904 and was sold in 1947.
- HMS Satellite was an Algerine-class minesweeper launched in 1942 as HMS Melita. She was renamed HMS Satellite on becoming a drill ship in 1947. The name reverted to Melita in 1951, and she was sold for scrapping in 1959.
- HMS Satellite was an Algerine-class minesweeper launched in 1943 as HMS Brave. She was renamed HMS Satellite on becoming a drill ship in 1951, and was sold in 1958.
