= Ulmus americana 'Burgoyne' =

Elm cultivar

- Species: Ulmus americana
- Cultivar: 'Burgoyne'
- Origin: Weston, Mass. US

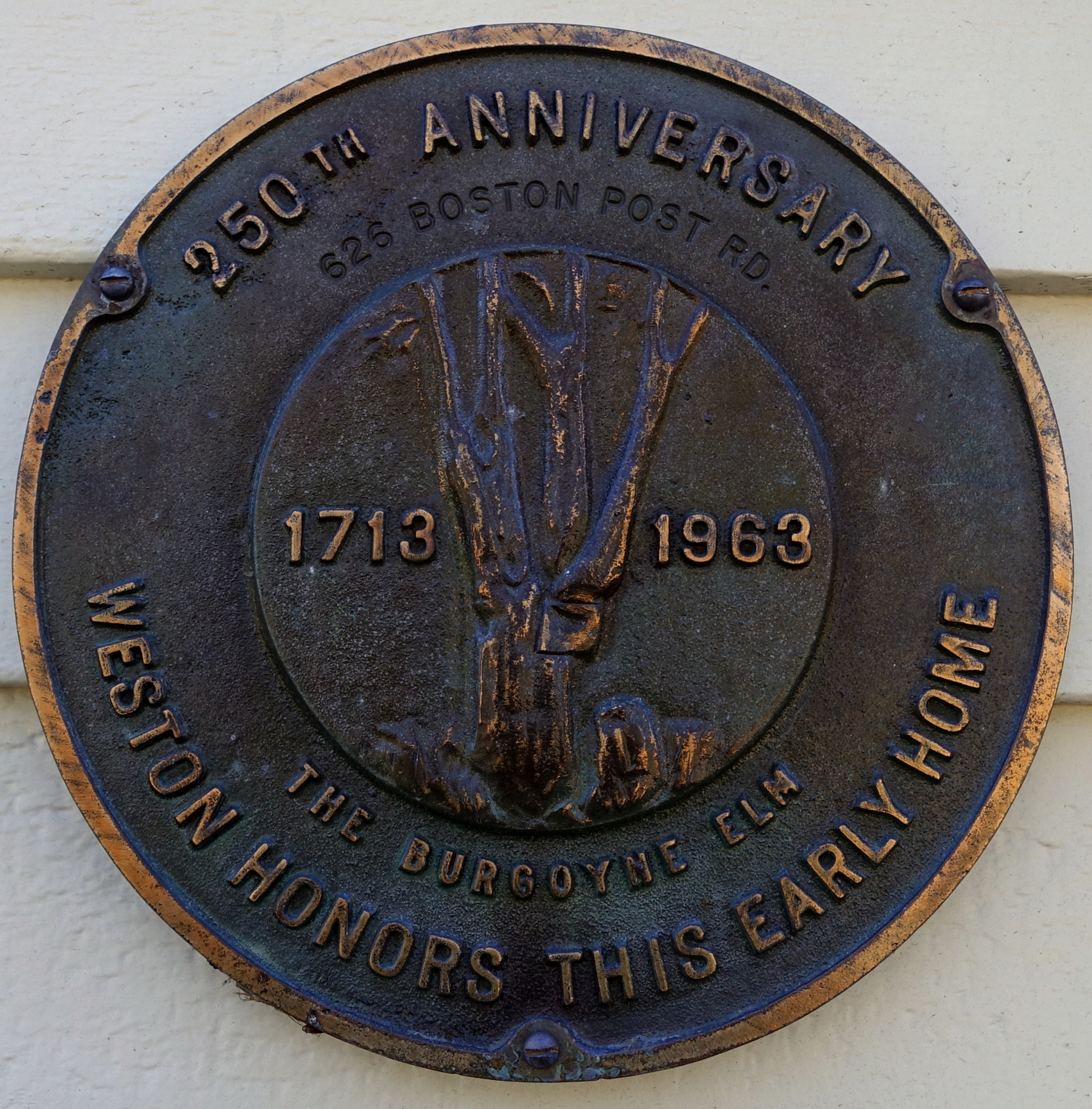
Memorial medal in Weston, featuring the Burgoyne elm

The American elm cultivar Ulmus americana 'Burgoyne' stood at the Arnold Arboretum until removed in 1988. Grown for the town of Weston, Massachusetts, the tree was raised in 1965 by Dr. Donald Wyman, retired head horticulturist of Arnold Arboretum (and himself of Weston), from seeds of the historic Burgoyne Elm, that stood for c.300 years at 626 Boston Post Road, Weston, before being felled in 1967 (bole girth 25 ft.) In October 1777 a contingent of British prisoners-of-war from General Burgoyne's defeated army, captured by General Gates, bivouacked under the original tree, then nearly a century old, on their way to prison in Somerville.

The name of the tree was first noted in records of the Plant Sciences Data Center of the American Horticultural Society, but is not formally recognized as a valid cultivar.

== Description ==
The original tree in Weston was broad at the top with irregular ascending branches.

== Pests and diseases ==
The Weston tree succumbed to Dutch elm disease. The species as a whole is highly susceptible to elm yellows; it is also moderately preferred for feeding and reproduction by the adult elm leaf beetle Xanthogaleruca luteola, and highly preferred for feeding by the Japanese beetle Popillia japonica in the United States. U. americana is also the most susceptible of all the elms to verticillium wilt.

== Cultivation ==
Four scions of the Burgoyne elm were also planted near the parent tree in Weston in 1965. These eventually succumbed to DED and were replaced in 2021 by a disease-resistant strain of American elm. It is not known whether 'Burgoyne' remains in cultivation elsewhere.
