= Burgundy (stock market) =

Burgundy was a multilateral trading facility focused on the Nordic markets which opened on June 12, 2009, for trading. Burgundy offered a high-performance and cost-efficient securities trading service with trading in more than 800 Swedish, Finnish and Danish instruments.

Burgundy was included in the Nordic Light data feed.

Burgundy's last trading day was 30 April 2015.

== Consortium ==
Leading Nordic banks and securities trading firms founded and were shareholders of Burgundy. Retail or institutional investors can trade on Burgundy via one of Burgundy's trading participants. Since 2012 Burgundy is fully owned by Oslo Børs.
