= YMCA Camp Orkila =

Youth camp in Washington, United States

Coordinates: 48.7007°N 122.941°W

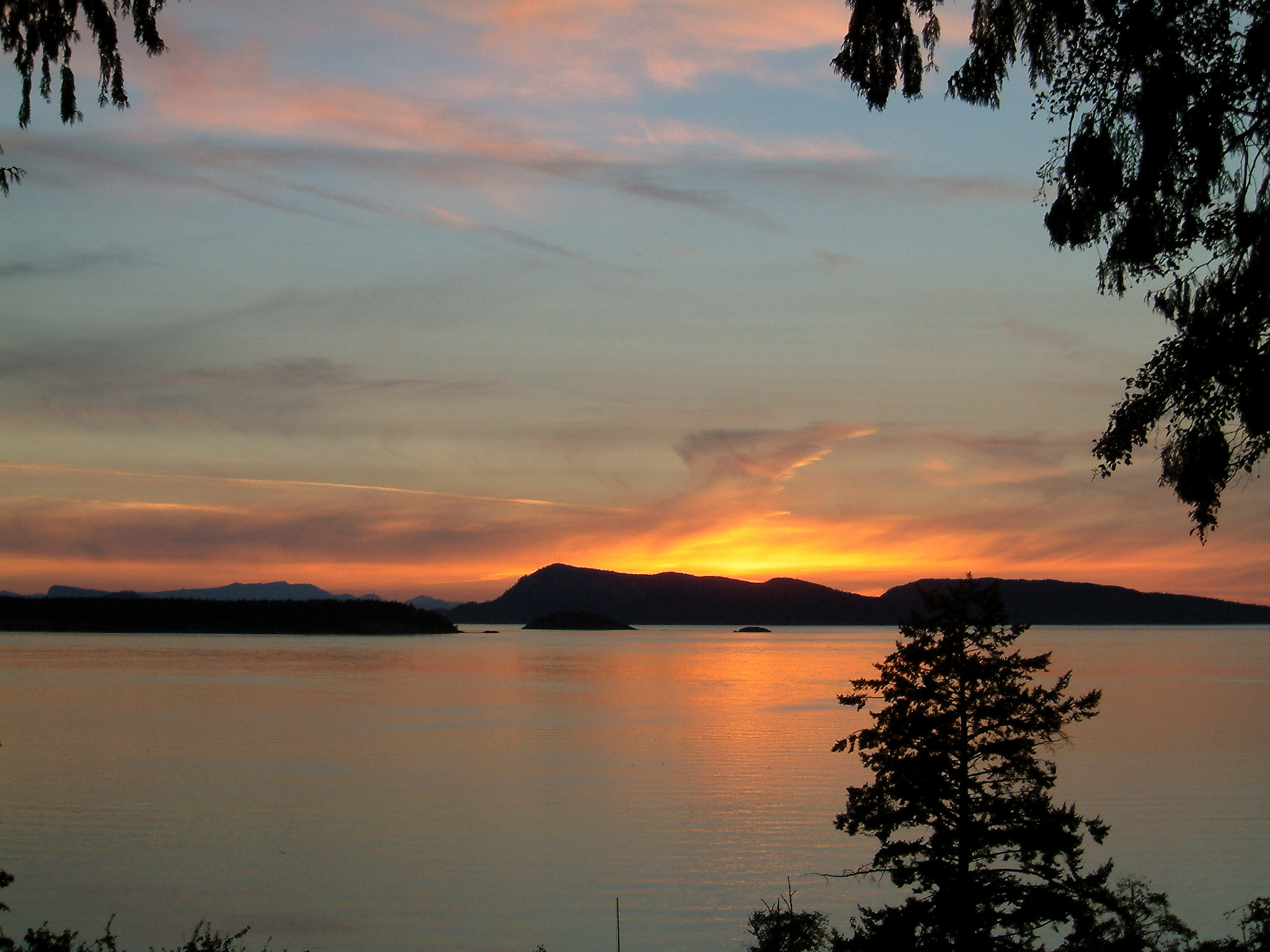
View of typical sunset from Camp Orkila's Chapel Ridge

Camp Orkila is on the northwest shoulder of Orcas Island in the San Juan Islands of Washington, overlooking Presidents Channel, and the Canadian Gulf Islands. It has been in operation since 1906.

It is operated by the Greater Seattle Area's YMCA. It is open year-round and offers many different programs ranging from conference and retreat hosting to summer camp and teen expedition programs for grades 3 through 12 during the summer, and the Orkila Outdoor Environmental Education Center during the spring and fall.

== Property and Facilities ==
Camp Orkila's main property is situated on the northwest shoulder of Orcas Island, and is approximately 280 acres in size. This property includes many cabins for campers to sleep in, as well as two lodges, though only one is currently being used for eating, two campfire pits, low and high ropes team building courses, a junior-Olympic sized pool, a Marine Salmon Center (often called the MSC), a zip-line, a barn, a garden, and many other program areas allowing for a wide range of activities and specialty camps throughout the summer. Cabins were formerly open-air, however doors were added for the summer of 2017. While cabins make up the majority of the living space on property, there are many staff-specific living spaces, as well as the Dederer Conference Center, located near the entrance to camp which serves as director housing during the summer, and is used for guest housing as well as staff housing during the spring and fall seasons. The YMCA also owns Satellite Island as well as a 10.5 acre property in Moran State Park known as Twin Lakes. Satellite Island is used by both traditional campers for one night island trip each week, as well as a location for Orkila's Teen Expedition participants to stay as a part of their expeditions throughout the San Juan islands. Twin lakes fills a very similar role, while remaining on the island, and is accessible by a 2.2 mile hike.

== See also ==
Other overnight camps for children in the San Juan Islands include:

- Canoe Island Camps
- Camp Nor'Wester
- Camp Four Winds Westward Ho
