= Burgoyne Bay =

Bay in British Columbia, Canada

Coordinates: 48°48′N 123°32′W

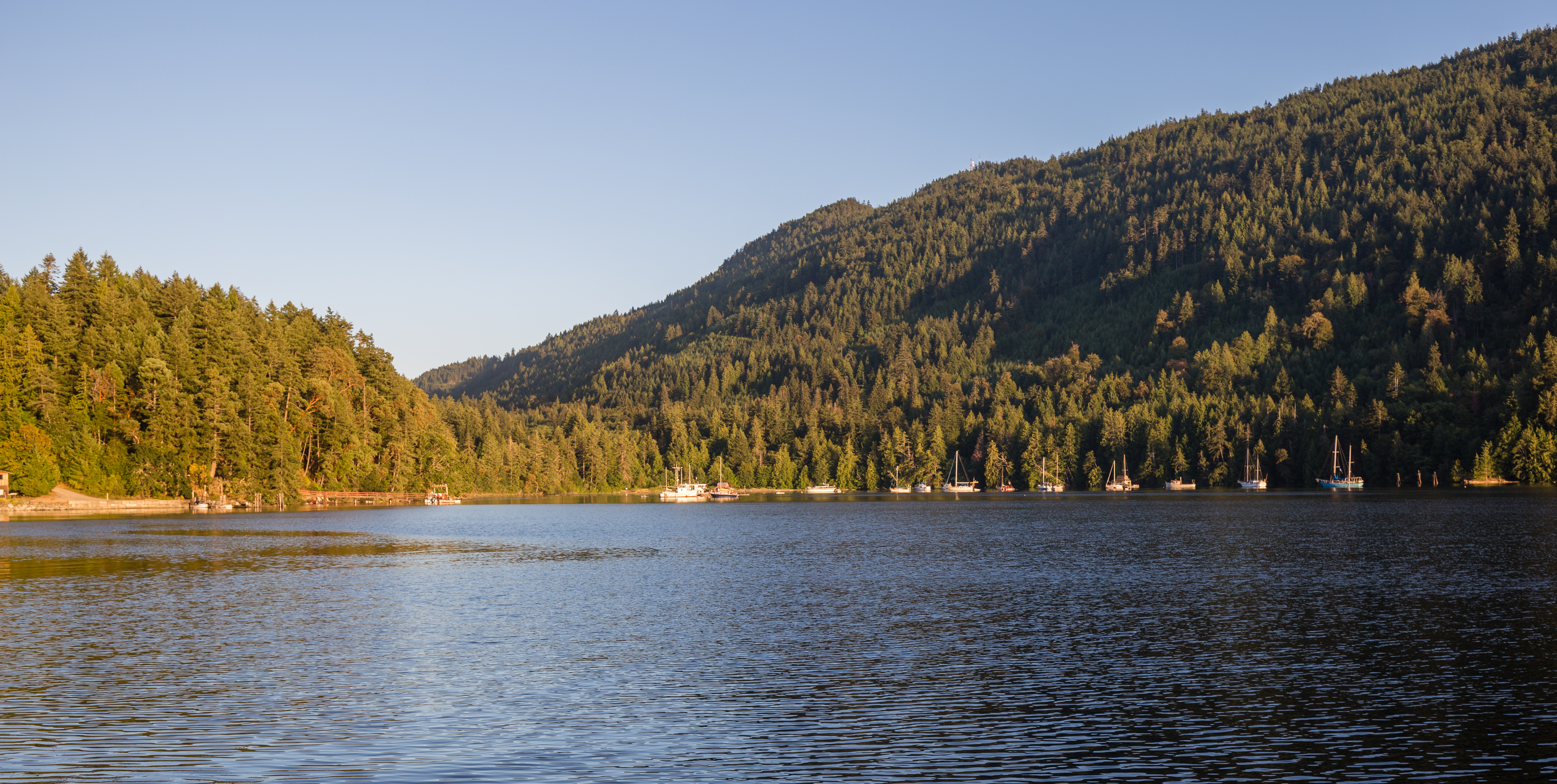
Burgoyne Bay

Burgoyne Bay (Halkomelem: Xwaaqw'um) is located at the southern end of Saltspring Island in British Columbia, Canada. The shores of the bay are part of the Mount Maxwell Ecological Reserve. The bay branches off from Sansum Narrows, which separates Saltspring from Vancouver Island.

It was named by Captain Richards in 1859 after Victoria Cross holder Hugh Talbot Burgoyne. Burgoyne was serving on HMS Ganges, the flagship of the Royal Navy's Pacific Station at the time, and Richards named many features during his survey after people or ships of the station; for instance the next bay along the island, Fulford Harbour, was named after the captain of Ganges, and a local settlement named after the ship itself.

The Halkomelem name for Burgoyne Bay (Xwaaqw’um) means "female merganser duck place", specifically the red-breasted merganser which congregate there year-round.
