= Sansum Narrows =

Strait in British Columbia, Canada

Coordinates: 48°48′00″N 123°34′00″W

Sansum Narrows is a strait or channel between Vancouver Island (W) and Saltspring Island (E) in the Southern Gulf Islands region of British Columbia, Canada. The narrows are between Maple Bay and Tl’ulpalus.

The powerline HVDC Vancouver-Island crosses Sansum Narrows in a 1900 metres long span, connecting Salt Spring Island to Vancouver Island's electric power.

== See also ==
- Cowichan Bay
- Trincomali Channel
