= Gulf Islands =

Islands in British Columbia, Canada

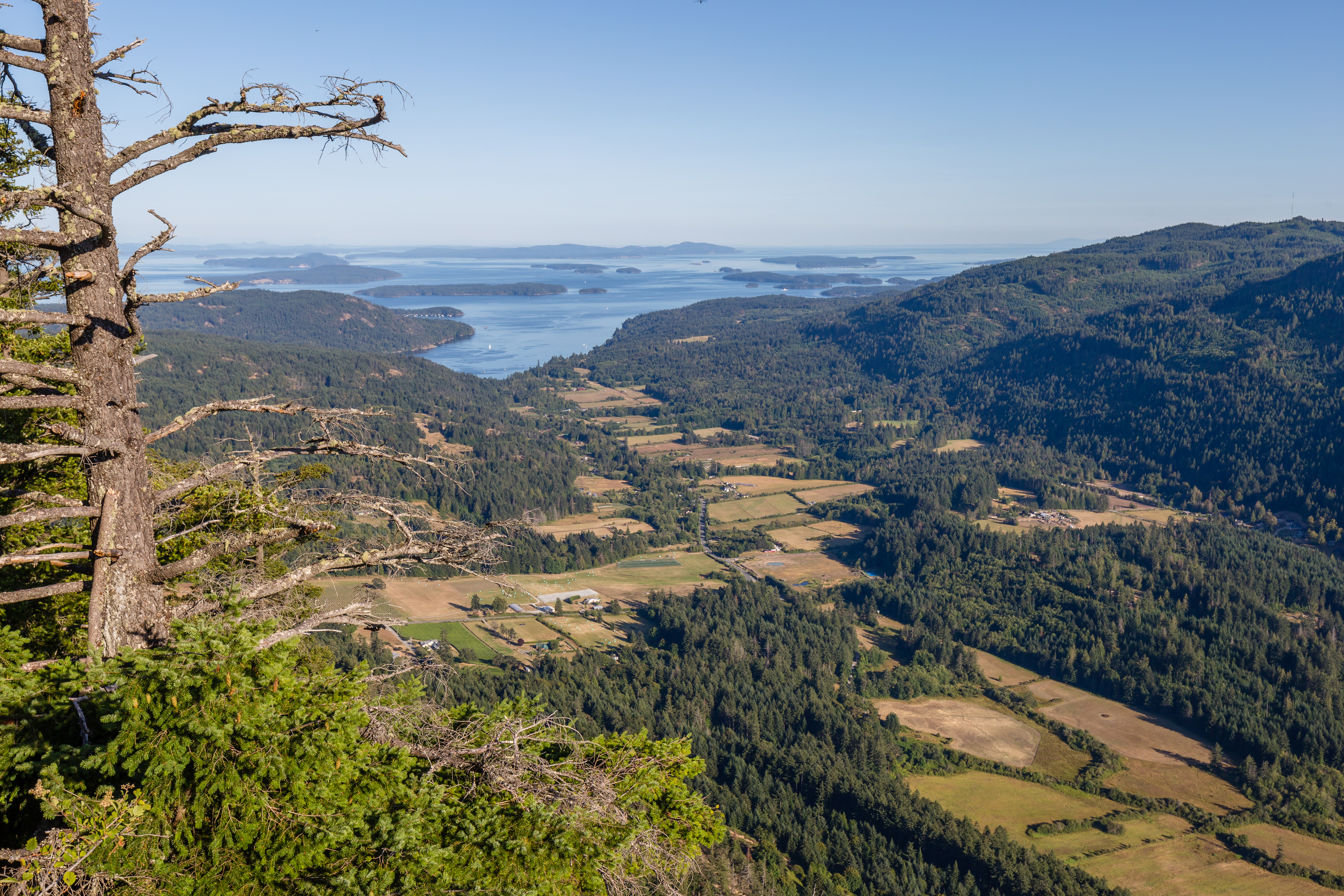
- View from Baynes Peak on Salt Spring Island
- Interactive map of Gulf Islands

Geography
- Location: Salish Sea
- Coordinates: 48°57′N 123°32′W
- Major islands: 20

Administration
- Canada
- Province: British Columbia

Demographics
- Population: 23,497 (2016 est.)

The Gulf Islands is a group of islands in the Salish Sea between Vancouver Island and the mainland coast of British Columbia.

== Etymology ==
The name "Gulf Islands" comes from "Gulf of Georgia", the original term used by George Vancouver in his mapping of the southern part of the archipelago and which before the San Juan Island dispute also was taken to include what have since been called the San Juan Islands. While geopolitically divided, the San Juan Islands and Gulf Islands geologically form part of the larger Gulf Archipelago.

Strictly speaking, the Strait of Georgia is only the wide, open waters of the main strait between the mainland and Vancouver Island, and does not officially refer to the adjoining waters between the islands and Vancouver Island but has become a common misnomer for the entire Gulf, which includes waters such as Active Pass (between Galiano Island and Mayne Island), Trincomali Channel (between Galiano Island and Saltspring Island), Sansum Narrows (between Saltspring Island and Vancouver Island), and Malaspina Strait (between Texada Island and the mainland around Powell River). "The Gulf" refers to all such waters collectively, and to those communities and shores surrounding it. Only the term "Strait of Georgia" remains in the provincial gazette although its use as a synonym for the Gulf is unofficial, while the term Gulf of Georgia remains in current use though not in the provincial gazette.

The term Salish Sea was adopted in 2010 to refer to the Strait of Georgia, the Strait of Juan de Fuca, Puget Sound, and all connecting and adjoining waters.

== Boundaries ==
According to BC Geographical Names (BCGNIS) the name "Gulf Islands" was originally intended and commonly understood to refer to the archipelago at the southern end of the Strait of Georgia; from Gabriola Island in the north to Saturna Island in the southeast and D'Arcy Island in the southwest. During the 1990s, however, the name began to be applied to all the islands in the Strait of Georgia, resulting in the introduction of the term "Southern Gulf Islands", which BCGNIS calls a misnomer, to distinguish the original "Gulf Islands" from the rest, which are sometimes called the "Northern Gulf Islands". BCGNIS further notes that Quadra Island is increasingly described as the "northernmost of the Gulf Islands".

== Island groups ==
The division of the Gulf Islands into two groups, the Southern and Northern Gulf Islands, is relatively common. The dividing line is approximately that formed by the city of Nanaimo on Vancouver Island, and the mouth of the Fraser River on the mainland. The islands of the Discovery Islands, Howe Sound, and Fraser River delta are not considered part of the Gulf Islands.

=== Southern Gulf Islands ===
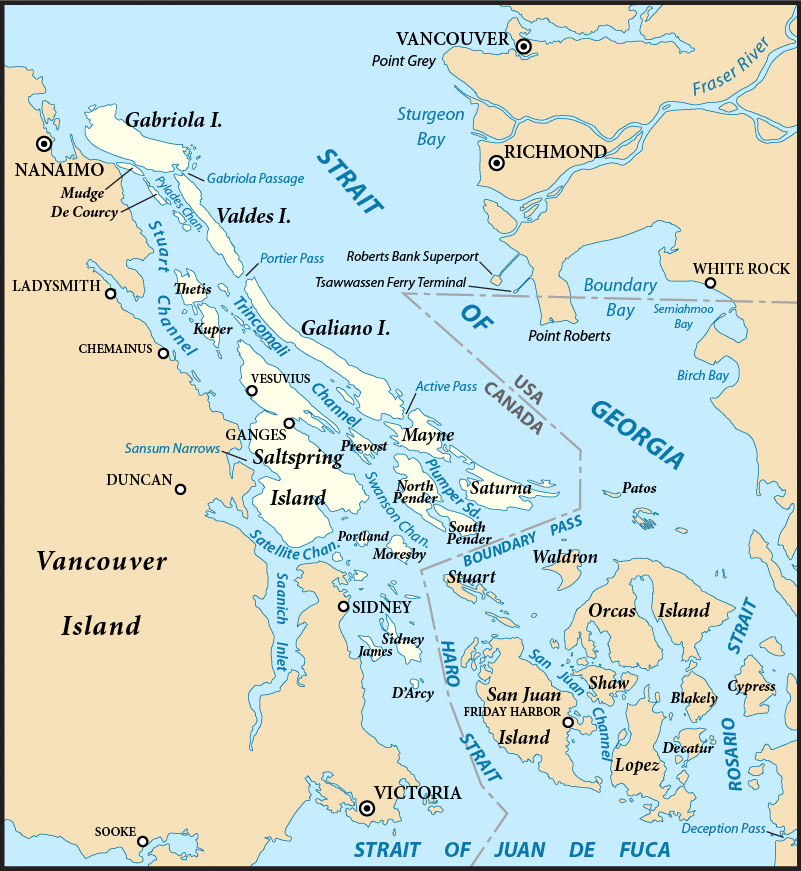
Southern Gulf Islands (highlighted)

The Southern Gulf Islands are near the southern end of the Strait of Georgia, forming an intricate network of waterways between them, collectively referred to as part of the Salish Sea. The Southern Gulf Islands include hundreds of islands and islets, and form part of a larger archipelago that also includes the nearby San Juan Islands of the state of Washington in the United States.

The major Southern Gulf Islands are:

Island	Regional district	Area (km^{2})	Population	Density (per km^{2})
Gabriola	Nanaimo	57.6	4,500	78.1
Galiano	Capital	60.15	1,396	17.4
Mayne	Capital	21	1,304	51
Moresby	Capital	8.34	3	0.4
Pender	Capital	34	2,467	66.0
Penelakut	Cowichan Valley	8.66	302	34.9
Prevost	Capital	6.75	?	?
Salt Spring	Capital	182.7	11,635	63.7
Saturna	Capital	31	465	11.3
Sidney	Capital	8.66	?	?
Thetis	Cowichan Valley	10.36	476	33.8
Valdes	Cowichan Valley	23	10	0.4

=== Northern Gulf Islands ===
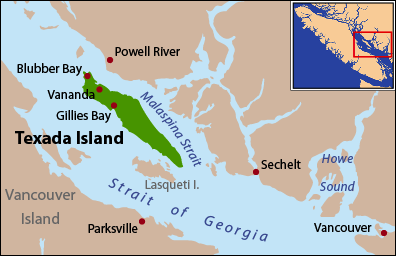
Texada Island (highlighted) and the surrounding Northern Gulf Islands

The Northern Gulf Islands are located near the northern end of the Strait of Georgia, including all islands south of Savary Island, the southernmost island of the neighbouring Discovery Islands.

The major Northern Gulf Islands are as follows:

Island	Regional district	Area (km^{2})	Population	Density (per km^{2})
Ahgykson	Qathet	9.25	0	0
Denman	Comox Valley	51.03	1,165	22.8
Hardy	Sunshine Coast	7.25	?	?
Hornby	Comox Valley	29.97	958	32.0
Lasqueti	Qathet	73.32	399	5.4
Nelson	Sunshine Coast	102.8	?	?
Texada	Qathet	300.45	1,053	3.5
Thormanby	Sunshine Coast	8.65	?	?

== Ecology ==
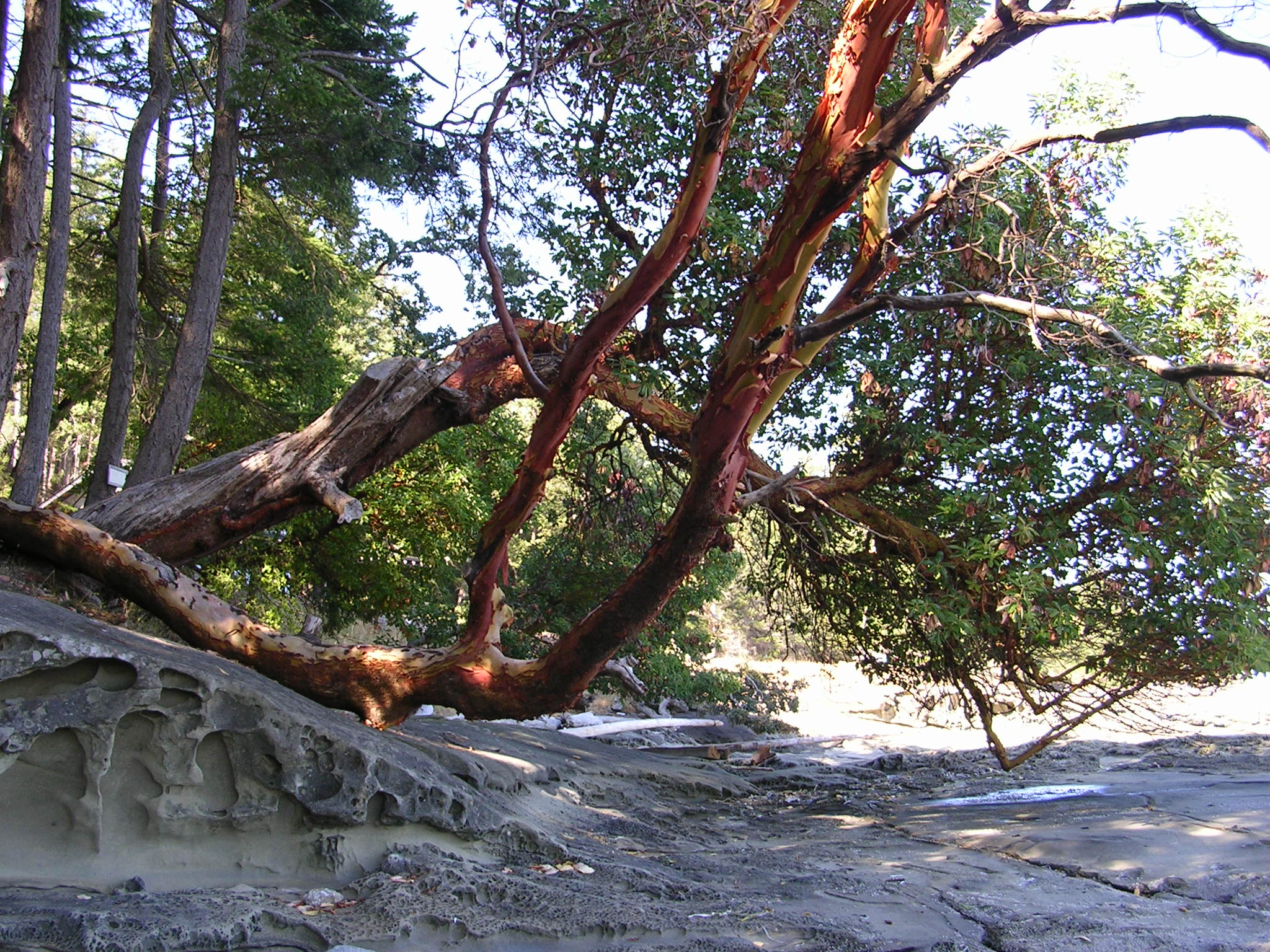
Arbutus trees and sandstone beaches are common in the Gulf Islands.

The islands and surrounding ocean are rich with ecologically diverse plants and sea life including Garry oaks, wild lilies, kelp beds and Orcas.

The Gulf Islands are home to one of the last remaining pockets of Garry oak ecosystems. Only about five percent of Garry oak ecosystems remain in their natural state, landing 91 of the approximately 350 species it supports on the province's list of species at risk. The unique Mediterranean characteristics of the islands' climate supports the Garry oak ecosystem. Garry oak ecosystems are home to more plant species, such as the camas, than any other terrestrial ecosystem in coastal B.C. and are one of Canada's most at-risk natural habitats.

Today, Garry oak meadows exist in the shallow and exposed soil of valleys, rocky foothills and southern slopes—areas that the settlers of the past 150 years have found unsuitable for agriculture or development.

The Garry Oak Ecosystems Recovery Team (GOERT), a partnership of a number of governmental and non-governmental agencies that comprise 22 individuals, was established in 1999 after the delegates of the First International Garry Oak Ecosystem Symposium met in Victoria and declared the ecosystem endangered. Since then, GOERT has been working to motivate public and private restoration of the rare ecosystem and promote conservation activities.

=== Conservation ===
The unique ecosystem of the islands has been a focal point of conservation efforts for decades. BC Parks operates a variety of provincial parks on the islands, the oldest being Mount Maxwell Provincial Park on Salt Spring Island.

In 2003, Parks Canada established Gulf Islands National Park Reserve to protect ecologically important regions of the southeastern Gulf Islands. As a National Park Reserve, the long-term goal is to protect most of the southeastern Gulf Islands.

In 2012, Parks Canada published a feasibility Study for the proposed Southern Strait of Georgia National Marine Conservation Area Reserve. The goal of the National Marine Conservation Area is to protect ecologically significant marine habitats and ensure sustainable use of marine resources. It would also serve as a complement to the existing national park reserve.

== Agriculture ==
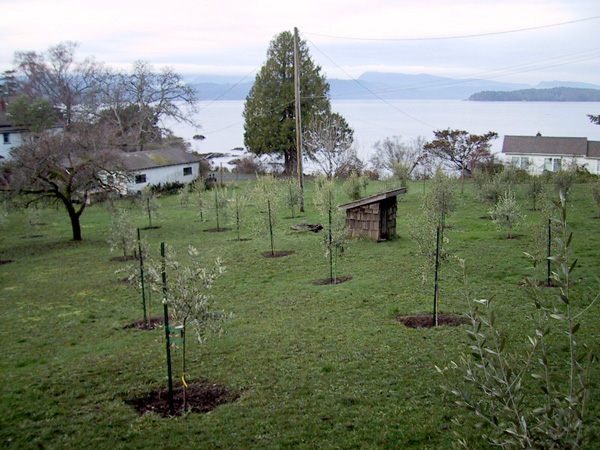
Grove positioned on a downward slope, creating a natural drainage system.

In most parts of Canada, olive trees cannot thrive; the long, harsh winter and short, humid summer and spring make it difficult for olives to grow comfortably and properly, but Pender Island, Saturna Island, and Salt Spring Island have a Mediterranean style climate that permits olive production.

Banana Joe Clemente was one of the first Islanders to introduce olive trees to the Southern Gulf Islands in 1993 growing dozens from seed. In 1994/1995, planting a grove of the seed-grown olive trees around a Botchi pit on Salt Spring Island. He also distributed them to Islanders for their private gardens. Banana Joe is also responsible for introducing Musa basjoo, a hardy species of Banana plant to Salt Spring Island.

Farm owner Andrew Butt planted his first olive tree in 2001 at his farm on Pender Island, using Frantoio and Leccino cultivars that he obtained from California. He uses kelp obtained from the surrounding straits as fertilizer and uses a pruning method that enhances the sunlight exposure on the trees. Michael Pierce and colleagues established an olive tree nursery on Saturna Island in 2009 that supplied olive trees to the region.

== Transportation ==
The larger populated islands are served by BC Ferries, which operates various vehicle and passenger ferries between the Gulf Islands and to terminals near the major cities of Nanaimo and Victoria on Vancouver Island as well as Vancouver on the mainland.

None of the islands are linked to another island by bridge, the exception being Pender Island which was artificially divided into two by a canal dug in 1903. Various proposals have been made to link one or more of the islands to another island, or with the mainland coast of the province, without success. Challenges include high capital costs, the presence of ecologically sensitive ecosystems, the mountainous terrain of the islands, impracticality due to the low population of the islands, and opposition from locals.

== See also ==
- List of islands of Canada
- Islands Trust
- Southern Gulf Islands Electoral Area
