= Sabine Channel Marine Provincial Park =

Provincial park in British Columbia, Canada

- IUCN category II (national park)
- Location within Vancouver Island Location within British Columbia
- Location: British Columbia, Canada
- Nearest city: Qualicum Beach
- Coordinates: 49°30′57″N 124°15′33″W
- Area: 22.54 km^{2} (8.70 sq mi)
- Established: April 11, 2001
- Governing body: BC Parks

Sabine Channel Marine Provincial Park, also known as Sabine Channel Provincial Park, is a provincial park in British Columbia, Canada, in the waters surrounding Jervis Island in Sabine Channel, which separates Texada Island, to the north, from Lasqueti Island, which lies to the south. Established in 2001, the park is approximately 2,254 hectares (5,570 acres) in size.

== See also ==
- List of British Columbia provincial parks
