= Weird or What? =

- Genre: Docudrama
- Directed by: Sean Michael Turrel, Stephen Scott, Logan Johnson
- Presented by: William Shatner
- Original language: English
- No. of seasons: 3
- No. of episodes: 30

Production
- Executive producers: Simon Lloyd, William Shatner
- Producer: Simon Lloyd
- Running time: 44 minutes
- Production companies: Shaw Media; Cineflix

Original release
- Network: Discovery Channel; History (Canada); National Geographic Channel (Canada); Syfy
- Release: April 21, 2010 – August 14, 2012

Related
- Dark Matters: Twisted But True, The UnXplained

Weird or What? is a television series on the Discovery Channel and History (Canada) hosted by William Shatner (except for the U.S. version of Season 1, where his segments were replaced by a fourth story). Each episode contains three separate stories of the bizarre and unexplained. As the show unfolds, it weighs various supernatural and scientific theories that attempt to explain the story, and sometimes features tests conducted as proof of a theory's plausibility. The show features phenomena such as ghosts, aliens, monsters, medical oddities and natural disasters.

== Episodes ==
| Season | Episodes | Originally aired | |
| Season | Episodes | First aired | Last aired |
|---|---|---|---|
| 1 | 10 | April 21, 2010 | June 9, 2010 |
| 2 | 10 | September 12, 2011 | November 21, 2011 |
| 3 | 10 | May 28, 2012 | August 14, 2012 |

The U.S. version of season 1 of the show features four stories per episode. This version is also shown in New Zealand. The version generally shown outside of the U.S. features three stories per episode, in a different order and is hosted by William Shatner.

=== Season 1 (U.S. version) ===
Note: Online streaming of U.S. episodes are not available

| No. | Title | Original release date |
|---|---|---|
| 101 | "Strange Survival" | April 21, 2010 |
A man survives a fall from a 50 story building; Rocks that propel themselves; Killer ice balls falls from the sky (Megacryometeor); Pacific Northwest human foot discoveries
| 102 | "Ghost Ship" | April 28, 2010 |
Mysterious lights hover over a small town in Texas. Civilians' stories of UFOs conflict with the Air Force's claims of F-16s dropping flares.; A fishing boat vanishes without a trace in California, only to be found entirely undamaged at the bottom of the ocean months later.; "The Bloop" is the loudest sound heard in history, that is certain. But what caused it is the mystery.; A scientist notices that cows always face either north or south, can they really sense the Earth's magnetic poles?
| 103 | "Cocaine Mummies" | May 5, 2010 |
When scientists run tests on mummies they find traces of cocaine in their hair. Did Ancient Egyptian pharaohs get the coca plant from South America to Egypt?; The San Francisco sea lions from Pier 39 mysteriously vanish only to turn up in Oregon about a week later.; The mysterious Voynich Manuscript, written in a strange language (or code) in the 15th century defies translation. What mysteries do its pages hold?; A Mexican tribe that can run hundreds of miles in a single day! How do they do it?
| 104 | "Grim Reapers" | May 12, 2010 |
When a surfer is attacked by a great white shark, a pod of dolphins come over and save him. Were they protecting their young? Or were they protecting the surfer?; A cat and dog at two separate retirement homes seem to be able to predict patients' deaths. How is that possible?; Is time travel possible? When a woman materializes out of nowhere it seems so.; A skinny teenager lifts a car off of his uncle who was pinned beneath it while working on it. How did the teen weighing about 115 pounds lift a car all by himself?
| 105 | "Human Popsicle" | May 19, 2010 |
Human sacrifice in New Hampshire; A child survives being frozen solid; Mysterious mountain lights; Ice circles visible from space
| 106 | "Personality Transplant" | June 2, 2010 |
Anchors found off the coast of California are identified as Chinese-made; A man develops characteristics of his heart donor; A man survives multiple lightning strikes; Plants have ability to detect people's thoughts
| 107 | "Mind Control War" | June 9, 2010 |
Woman with breast implants survives gunshot; Woman has two sets of DNA; People with psychic powers; Two people save each other at different times

=== Season 1 (International version) ===
| No. | Title | Original release date |
|---|---|---|
| 101 | TBA | TBA |
Summary: A man miraculously survives a fall from a 50-story building.; Killer ice balls fall from the sky. (Megacryometeor); Pacific Northwest human foot discoveries
| 102 | TBA | TBA |
Summary: U.S. Air Force planes in hot pursuit of UFOs; One of the loudest sounds in the natural world from the depths of the ocean. ("The Bloop"); A fishing trawler vanishes in calm waters.
| 103 | TBA | TBA |
Summary: Thousands of sea lions disappear before a major San Francisco earthquake.; A mysterious medieval manuscript written in a secret code (Voynich Manuscript); Evidence of cocaine in mummies - a substance not found in Egypt until thousands of years later.
| 104 | TBA | September 22, 2010 |
Summary: A surfer is saved by dolphins from a shark attack.; Pets identifying people about to die.; A teen lifts a car to free a man trapped underneath.
| 105 | TBA | September 29, 2010 |
Summary: Rocks appear to be moving around on their own in Death Valley. (Sailing stones); Mysterious lights at North Carolina’s Brown Mountain.; Tribe members in the mountains of Northern Mexico run 18 times further than a marathon (Tarahumara people).
| 106 | TBA | TBA |
Summary: A mysterious woman suddenly materializes out of thin air.; Human sacrifice in New Hampshire. (American Stonehenge); Plants seem to possess strange powers to detect human thought.
| 107 | TBA | October 13, 2010 |
Summary: A man is struck by lightning six times and survives.; A toddler is frozen and then thawed again without injury; Chinese anchors said to be from Chinese explorers long before Columbus
| 108 | TBA | TBA |
Summary: A woman survives a shot in the chest.; A young man saves the life of a woman and discovers she had saved his life seven years ago.; Most of the world’s cows are facing the same direction.
| 109 | TBA | TBA |
Summary: A patient assumes the personality of his heart donor.; Perfect circles of ice are appearing in lakes and rivers.; A mother undergoes a DNA test that reveals she is genetically unrelated to her children.
| 110 | TBA | TBA |
Summary: The U.S. Army investigates paranormal mind control.; A boy loses his thumb and it grows back thanks to a mysterious powder.; Archaeologists find clues that suggest that a race of ‘hobbits’ lived on Earth.

=== Season 2 ===
| No. | Title | Original release date |
|---|---|---|
| 201 | "Alien Encounters" | September 12, 2011 |
Summary: A cow is mutilated by unknown forces.; A man is repeatedly abducted from his bed.; An astronomer intercepts a mysterious message Wow! signal from outer space.
| 202 | "Life After Death" | September 19, 2011 |
Summary: A man believes he is the Reincarnation of a dead general.; Scientists in England conduct a series of séances.; A man dies but returns from the grave 20 years later.
| 203 | "Monsters" | September 26, 2011 |
Summary: A town is terrorized by the ‘mothman’.; A fisherman discovers the remains of an unidentified sea creature. (Globster); In New Delhi thousands report being attacked by the ‘monkey man’.
| 204 | "End of the World" | October 3, 2011 |
Summary: A deadly super volcano beneath Yellowstone National Park.; A solar storm could destroy the planet.; A sinister robot takeover could kill all humans.
| 205 | "Parallel Worlds" | October 17, 2011 |
Summary: A woman has an encounter with a mysterious human-shaped shadow.; A weird machine transports a six-year-old boy and his father hundreds of miles in a second.; Crystal skulls are thought to be gateways to other dimensions.
| 206 | "Freaks of Nature" | October 24, 2011 |
Summary: A small community is devastated by an earth-shattering ‘boom‘.; A paranormal fog haunts Lake Michigan.; A blinding double flash of light over the Indian Ocean sends a nation into panic.
| 207 | "Ghosts" | October 31, 2011 |
Summary: A woman is terrorized by an invisible attacker.; A mother undergoes a demonic transformation then turns to an ancient Catholic ritual for help.; A teenager sees a ghost.
| 208 | "Medical Mysteries" | November 7, 2011 |
Summary: A woman and her unborn baby survive a parachute accident.; A man is incinerated as he lies in his bed with no explanation.; A schoolgirl seems to have electrical powers.
| 209 | "Power of the Mind" | November 14, 2011 |
Summary: A woman has a vision that helps to solve a murder case.; A man remembers every single moment from every single day of his life.; A faith healer miraculously cures a woman.
| 210 | "Amazing Artifacts" | November 21, 2011 |
Summary: A bizarrely-shaped thousand-year-old skull that may be from an alien. (Starchild skull); Detailed images of dinosaurs on stone carvings. (Ica stones); A 2000-year-old wooden model may be proof that ancient Egyptians invented modern flight. (Saqqara Bird)

=== Season 3 ===
| No. | Title | Original release date |
|---|---|---|
| 301 | "Amazing Survival" | May 28, 2012 |
Summary: A man gets trapped in one of the collapsing Twin Towers- How did he cheat death?; A man is cut in half by a train and survives by calling 911 for help.; A man is attacked by a hippopotamus- How did he live through his fatal injuries?
| 302 | "Man Beasts" | June 4, 2012 |
Summary: A woman and her son come face to face with the legendary Jersey Devil.; A sleepy South Carolina town is terrorized by a giant reptile.; A bloodthirsty werewolf-like creature appears on a remote country road.
| 303 | "Aliens Walk Among Us" | June 11, 2012 |
Summary: A Mexican rancher slays a mysterious creature.; Was an Arizona woman fathered by an alien?; A serviceman befriends a colony of extraterrestrials.
| 304 | "Curses" | June 18, 2012 |
Summary: Houses in England are burning leaving a painting unburnt each time, is The Crying Boy causing the fires?; A child's toy known as Robert the Doll appears to cause bad luck to people that cross his path.; "Winchester Mansion" was the home of Sarah Winchester, did she keep building rooms to house ghosts she was haunted by?
| 305 | "Weird Animal Behaviour" | June 25, 2012 |
Summary: Paul the Octopus is able to choose winners of football matches that haven't played yet.; What is causing dogs to jump to their death in Scotland, are they committing suicide?; A pet cat called Sugar travels from California to Oklahoma to rejoin owners, but how did she find them?
| 306 | "Ghosts In The Machine" | July 9, 2012 |
Summary: Are 2 dead pilots haunting planes that have recycled parts from their downed aircraft Eastern Air Lines Flight 401?; Is a painting called "the Anguished Man" possessed by its deceased painter and haunting its owners?; A man in New Zealand starts being haunted by the previous owner of his house after receiving a photograph of him.
| 307 | "Premonitions" | July 16, 2012 |
Summary: A boy predicts a volcano eruption.; A man who predicts the crash of American Airlines Flight 191.; A man foresees 9/11 and Hurricane Katrina.
| 308 | "Mysterious Vanishings" | July 23, 2012 |
Summary: Three men vanish from a yacht in Queensland, Australia for no apparent reason.; Nearly a dozen people disappear from a remote Vermont mountain top.; A pilot vanishes after seeing an unidentified aircraft.
| 309 | "More Medical Mysteries" | July 30, 2012 |
Summary: A woman having an operation causes all the hospital staff to pass out- Is her blood toxic?; A man is struck by lightning, and upon recovery starts learning piano, eventually writing his own songs and performing sell-out concertos.; A teenage boy starts bleeding from his eyes with no apparent cause.
| 310 | "Mind Control" | August 14, 2012 |
Summary: A man has an x-ray and finds something implanted in his arm, with no knowledge of how it got there.; Pearl Curran contacts Patience Worth through an ouija board- Together they write numerous books.; A woman causes appliances to malfunction and people to act threatening towards her.

== DVD Releases ==
Season 1 was released in Australia August 2, 2012. The DVD contains all 10 international version episodes of season 1.

Season 1 DVD cover

Season 2 was released in Australia November 7, 2012. The DVD contains all 10 episodes of season 2 episodes.

Season 2 DVD cover

== See also ==
- Dark Matters: Twisted But True
- Mystery Hunters
- The UnXplained
