= Squitty Bay Provincial Park =

Provincial park in British Columbia, Canada

- IUCN category II (national park)
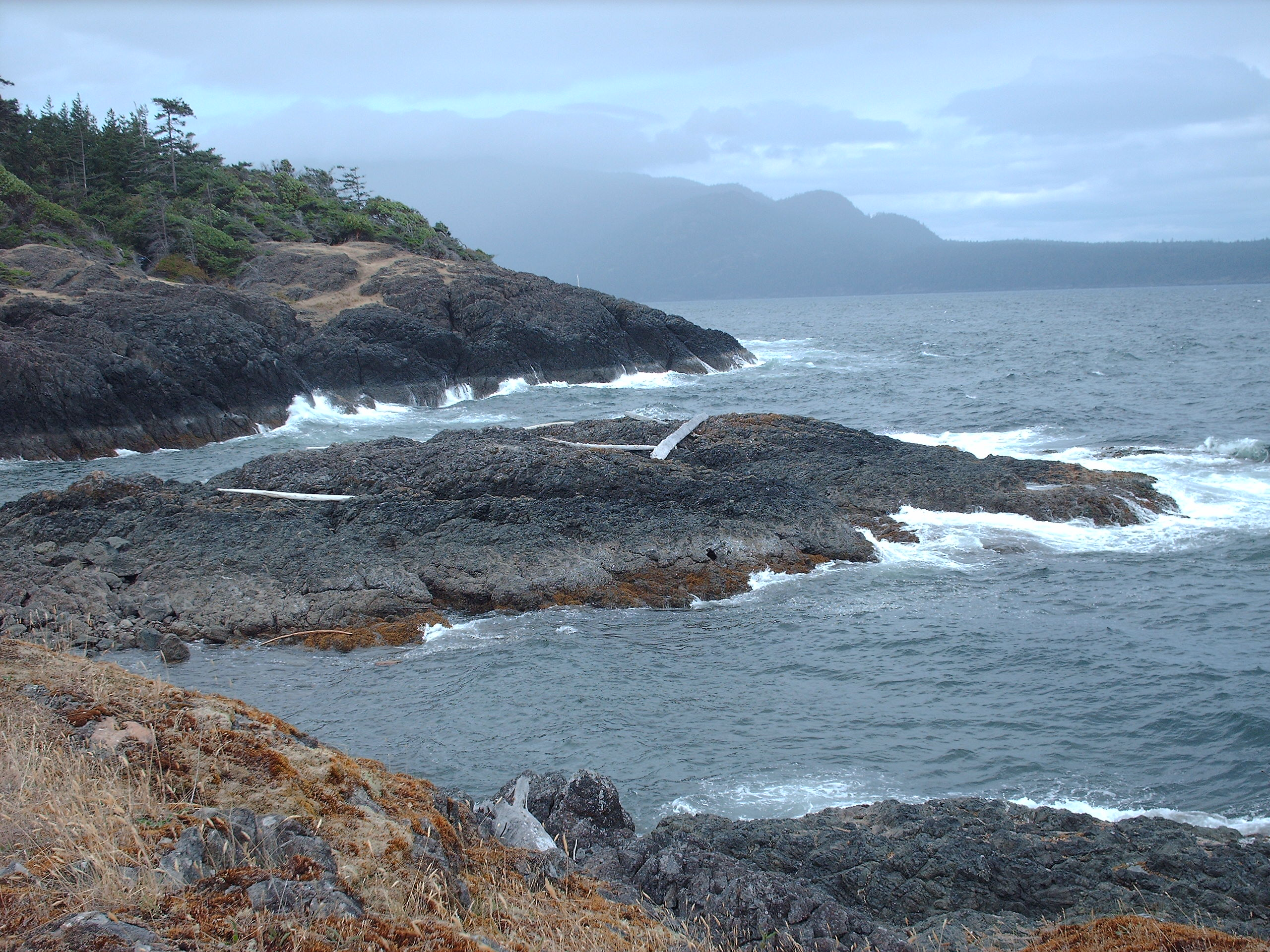
- Panoramic view

- Location within British Columbia
- Interactive map of Squitty Bay Provincial Park
- Location: British Columbia, Canada
- Nearest city: Parksville
- Coordinates: 49°27′08″N 124°10′00″W
- Area: 0.52 km^{2} (0.20 sq mi)
- Established: June 16, 1988
- Governing body: BC Parks

Squitty Bay Provincial Park is a provincial park in British Columbia, Canada, located on Lasqueti Island in the Northern Gulf Islands of the Strait of Georgia region.
