= Anderson Bay Provincial Park =

Provincial park in British Columbia, Canada

- IUCN category II (national park)
- Location within Vancouver Island Location within British Columbia
- Interactive map of Anderson Bay Provincial Park
- Location: Texada Island, British Columbia, Canada
- Nearest city: Gillies Bay, BC
- Coordinates: 49°30′44″N 124°08′09″W
- Area: 35 ha (0.35 km²)
- Established: 29 June 2000
- Governing body: BC Parks

Anderson Bay Provincial Park is a provincial park in British Columbia, Canada, located on the southeast end of Texada Island near the community of Gillies Bay. Created in 2000, it is approximately 35 hectares (86 acres) in area.

== History and conservation ==
The small island and peninsula are included in South Texada Island Provincial Park, but the head of the bay is private land. The park aims to protect black-tailed deer, birds and intertidal life.

== See also ==
- Buccaneer Bay Provincial Park
- South Texada Island Provincial Park
