= Rose Island =

Rose Island may refer to:

== Places ==
=== Canada ===
- Rose Island (Fraser River), adjacent to Kirkland Island, British Columbia
- Rose Island (Georgian Bay), an island of Ontario

=== United States ===
- Rose Island (Rhode Island), an island in Narragansett Bay
  - Rose Island Light
- Rose Island (amusement park), an abandoned amusement park near Charlestown, Indiana
- Rose Atoll, American Samoa
- Rose Island, a community in Fairhaven Township, Michigan
- Rose Island, an island in the Little Tennessee River opposite the Mialoquo archaeological site

=== Elsewhere ===
- Republic of Rose Island, a late-1960s micronation on an artificial platform in the Adriatic Sea
- Rose Island (Lake Starnberg), an island in Bavaria, Germany
- Rose Island (New Zealand), an island in the Auckland Group
- Rose Island, Bahamas
- Rose Isle, in the River Thames in Oxfordshire, UK
- Sacca Sessola, an island in the Venetian Lagoon, Italy, called "Island of Roses" by the hotel that occupies it
- Sir Hugh Rose Island, Andaman and Nicobar Islands, India

== Film ==
- Rose Island (film), a 2020 Italian film based on the Republic of Rose Island
