= Salish Sea =

Marginal sea in British Columbia and Washington state

- French: Mer des Salish
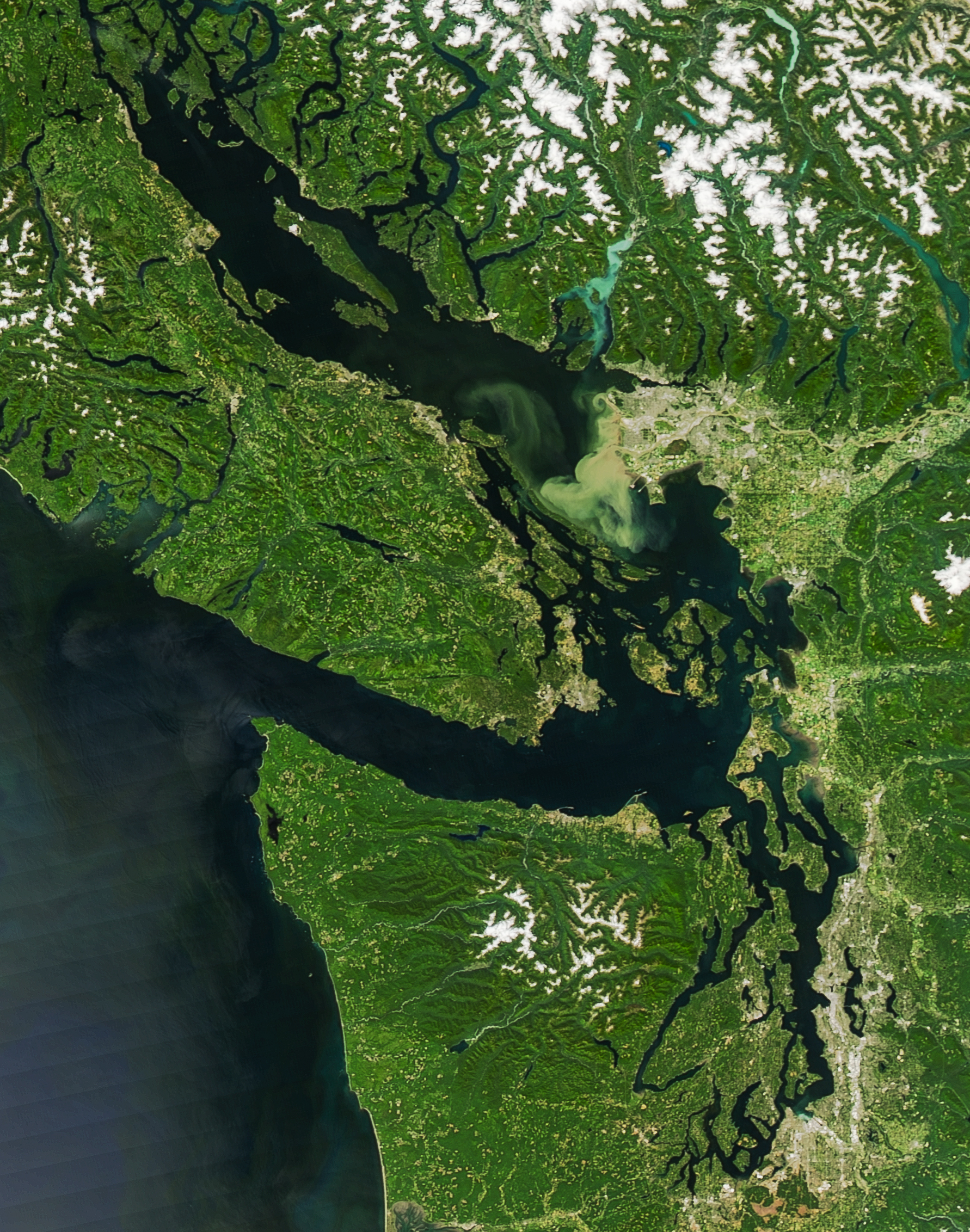
- The Salish Sea, showing the open Pacific Ocean at lower left, and from there, heading inland: the Strait of Juan de Fuca, the narrow Puget Sound at lower right, and the wide Strait of Georgia at upper center. Sediment from the Fraser River shows as a greenish plume in the Strait of Georgia.

- Location within Western Canada
- Location: British Columbia and Washington
- Coordinates: 48°56′12″N 123°03′40″W
- River sources: Fraser, Nisqually, Nooksack, Puyallup, Skagit, Snohomish and Squamish Rivers
- Ocean/sea sources: Pacific Ocean
- Catchment area: 110,000 km^{2} (42,000 mi^{2})
- Basin countries: Canada and United States
- Surface area: 18,000 km^{2} (6,900 mi^{2})
- Average depth: 130 m (430 ft)
- Max. depth: 670 m (2,200 ft)
- Residence time: 110 days
- Settlements: Seattle, Vancouver, Surrey, Tacoma, Victoria, Everett, Nanaimo

The Salish Sea (/ˈseɪlɪʃ/ SAY-lish) is a marginal sea of the Pacific Ocean located in the Canadian province of British Columbia and the U.S. state of Washington. It includes the Strait of Georgia, the Strait of Juan de Fuca, Puget Sound, and an intricate network of connecting channels and adjoining waterways.

The sea stretches from the channels of the Discovery Islands north of the Strait of Georgia to Budd Inlet at the south end of Puget Sound. It is partially separated from the open Pacific Ocean by Vancouver Island and the Olympic Peninsula.

Much of the coast is part of the Pacific Northwest and the region is anchored by Vancouver to the north and Seattle to the south. Other principal cities on the Salish Sea include Bellingham, Port Angeles, Port Townsend, Sequim, Everett, Tacoma, Olympia, and Bremerton in Washington, and Victoria and Nanaimo in British Columbia. As of 2021, the region was home to 8.76 million people.

== Name ==
=== Etymology ===
The first known use of the term "Salish Sea" was in 1988 when Bert Webber, a geography and environmental social studies professor emeritus in Huxley College of the Environment at Western Washington University in Bellingham, Washington, created the name for the combined waters in the region with the intention to complement the names Georgia Strait, Puget Sound, and Strait of Juan de Fuca, not replace them. The adoption of the term, he said, would raise consciousness about taking care of the region's waters and ecosystems. Webber's efforts are credited with the official recognition of the term in Canada and the U.S.

=== Coast Salish peoples ===
Distribution of Coast Salish languages in the early 19th century

The Coast Salish are the indigenous peoples who live in southwest British Columbia and northwest Washington along the Salish Sea and share a common linguistic and cultural origin. The Coast Salish are seen as one of the main cultural and linguistic branches of a larger group known as Salishan or Salish. Five divisions of the Salish language family are recognized, with Coast Salish and Interior Salish being the primary two. The Salish family consists of 23 separate languages. European and American explorers first encountered Salishan people along the Pacific Northwest coast in the late 18th century. The first detailed information was obtained by the Lewis and Clark Expedition of 1804–1806. The term "Salish" was originally applied only to the Interior Salish Flathead tribe living in the region of Flathead Lake, Montana. By the mid-20th century, it had been extended to cover all people speaking a similar language. The Flathead Nation continues to refer to their language and culture as Salish. A variant name for Flathead Lake is "Selish Lake". No overarching title exists for this area or even a commonly shared name for any of the waterbodies in any of the Coast Salish languages.

The waterways of the Salish Sea were important trade routes for the Coast Salish, and they remain a source of food and other resources for the Indigenous peoples. The basin includes territory of not only Coast Salish peoples, but also the Northern Wakashan Kwakwaka'wakw and Southern Wakashan peoples (the Nuu-chah-nulth, Makah, and Ditidaht) and, formerly, that of the Chimakum (a Chimakuan people related to the Quileute, who no longer exist as a recognizable group, having been wiped out by the Suquamish and others in the 19th century).

=== Official recognition ===
In March 2008, Chemainus First Nation proposed renaming the Georgia Strait the "Salish Sea", an idea that reportedly met with approval by British Columbia's Aboriginal Relations Minister Mike de Jong, who pledged to put it before the Executive Council of British Columbia for discussion. Making the name "Salish Sea" official required a formal application to the Geographical Names Board of Canada. A parallel American movement promoting the name had a different definition, combining the Strait of Juan de Fuca and Puget Sound, as well as the Strait of Georgia and related waters under the name Salish Sea.

In August 2009, the British Columbia Geographical Names Office approved a resolution recommending that the Geographical Names Board of Canada adopt the name Salish Sea contingent on approval by the United States Board on Geographic Names. The name was endorsed by the Washington State Board on Geographic Names in late October 2009. It was approved by the United States Board on Geographic Names on November 12, 2009, and by the British Columbia Geographical Names Office in February 2010. The French name Mer des Salish is also official in Canada.

In a 2019 survey of residents in the general vicinity of the Salish Sea, only 9% of Washingtonians and 15% of British Columbians were able to correctly identify and name the Salish Sea.

=== Other names ===
The region encompassing these waterways is or was also known variously as the Georgia–Puget or Puget–Georgia Basin, or in the singular as the Georgia Depression, the Georgia Basin or Puget Sound, et al. The Canadian half of the region was named in 1792 by George Vancouver, and often remains referred to as the Gulf of Georgia, a term which encompasses the Strait of Georgia and all other waters peripheral to it, as well as to the communities lining its shores or on its islands. Like the term "Puget Sound", the terms "Georgia Strait" and "Gulf of Georgia" refer to the general region, as well as the body of water.

== Geography ==
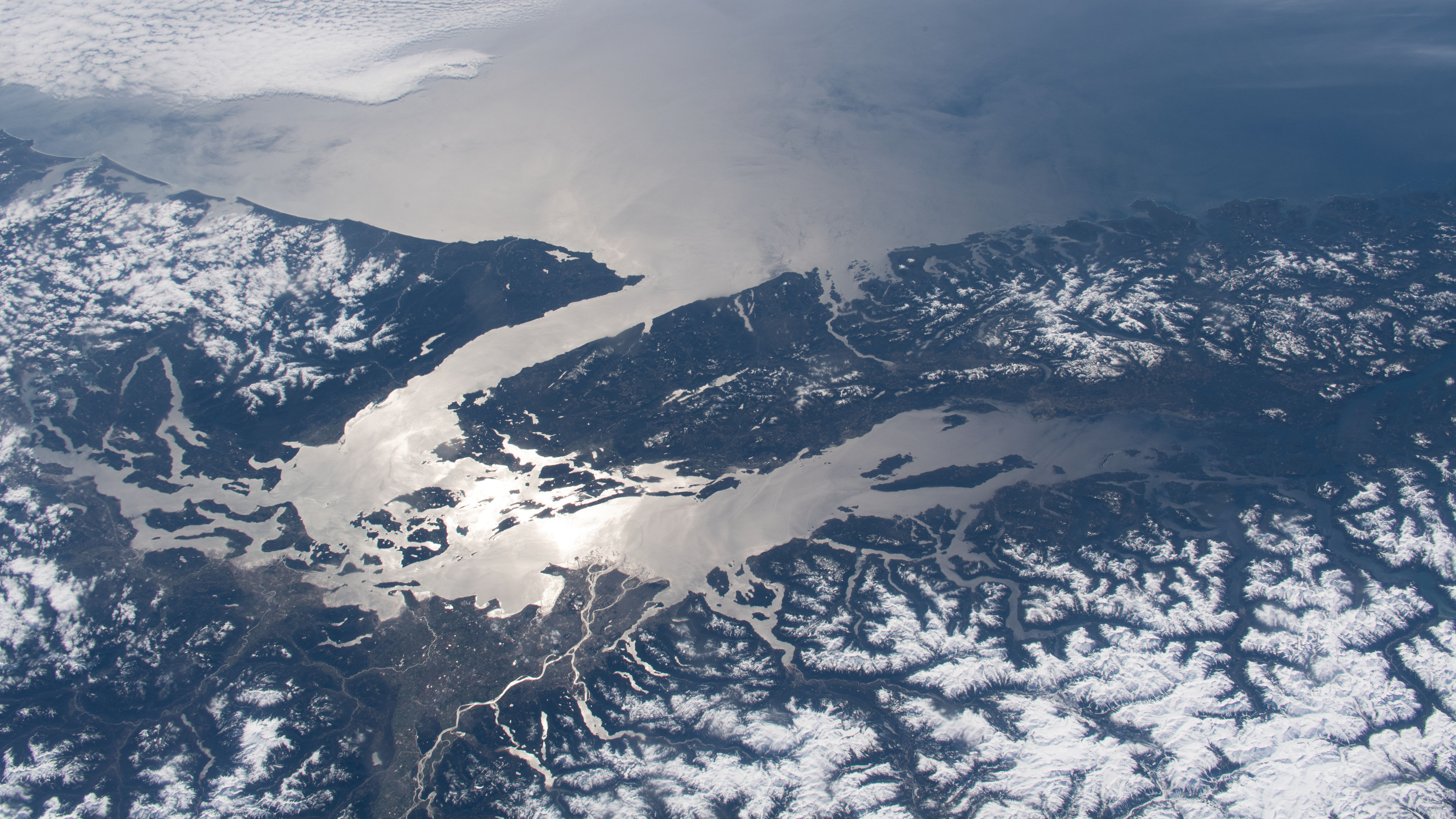
Sunlight reflects off the Salish Sea as seen from the International Space Station on April 11, 2020

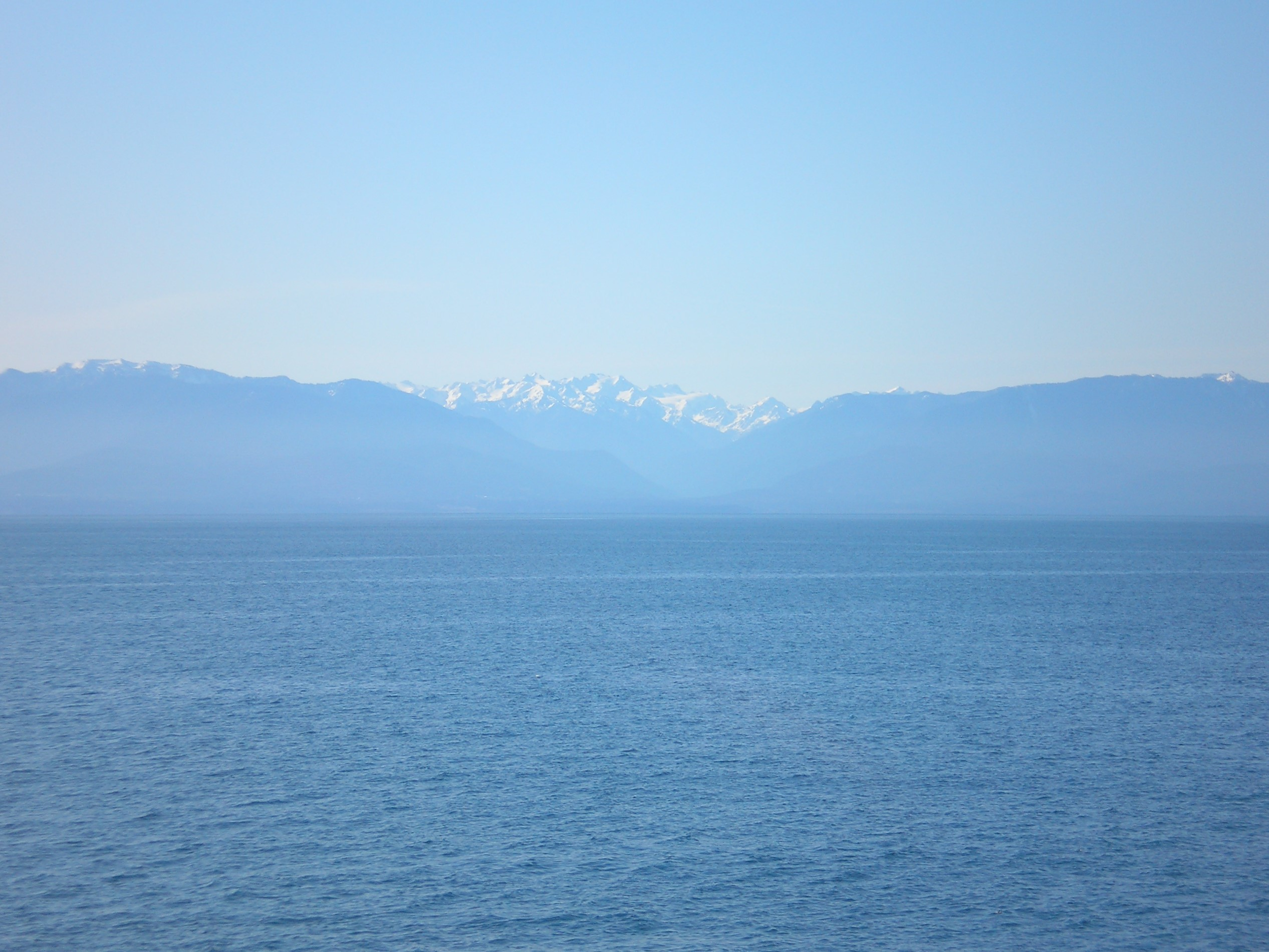
The Salish Sea with the Olympic Peninsula in the background

The Salish Sea is about 440 km (270 mi) long and has a surface area of about 18,000 km^{2} (6,900 mi^{2}), which is roughly the same size as the Gulf of Riga in Northern Europe. This combines the total surface area of the Strait of Georgia (6,400 km^{2} or 2,471 mi^{2}), Strait of Juan de Fuca (4,400 km^{2} or 1,699 mi^{2}), Puget Sound (2,500 km^{2} or 965 mi^{2}), Desolation Sound (1,100 km^{2} or 425 mi^{2}), and various other bodies of water (3,600 km^{2} or 1,390 mi^{2}). The sea has an average depth of 130 m (430 ft) and reaches a maximum depth of 670 m (2,200 ft) in Jervis Inlet.

=== Extent ===
The Transboundary Georgia Basin–Puget Sound Environmental Indicators Working Group defines the limits of the Salish Sea as:

On the West. The entrance to Juan de Fuca Strait (a line between Cape Flattery and Carmanah Point).

On the South. The south end of Puget Sound (the head of Budd Inlet).

On the North. Extends just beyond the Strait of Georgia to include those channels and waterways where the floodstream or tidal surge is from the south: Discovery Passage south of Seymour Narrows, Sutil Channel south of Penn Islands, Lewis Channel, Waddington Channel and Pendrell Sound, Desolation Sound, and the southern portion of Homfray Channel.

=== Hydrology ===
The watershed of the Salish Sea (not including the Upper Fraser River watershed) has a total area of about 110,000 km^{2} (42,000 mi^{2}), which is over six times the surface area of the sea itself. Major rivers discharging into the sea include the Fraser River, Nisqually River, Nooksack River, Puyallup River, Skagit River, Snohomish River, and Squamish River.

The flow of fresh water into the Salish Sea from numerous rivers and the introduction of salt from the Strait of Juan de Fuca create a salinity gradient, which varies considerably depending on seasonal changes in ocean currents and river discharge. The Fraser River is the single largest source of freshwater with an average discharge rate of 3,475 m^{3}/s (122,700 cu ft/s) and a maximum discharge rate of 17,000 m^{3}/s (600,000 cu ft/s).

Residence times at intermediate depths average 60 days in Puget Sound and 160 days in the Strait of Georgia.

=== Islands ===
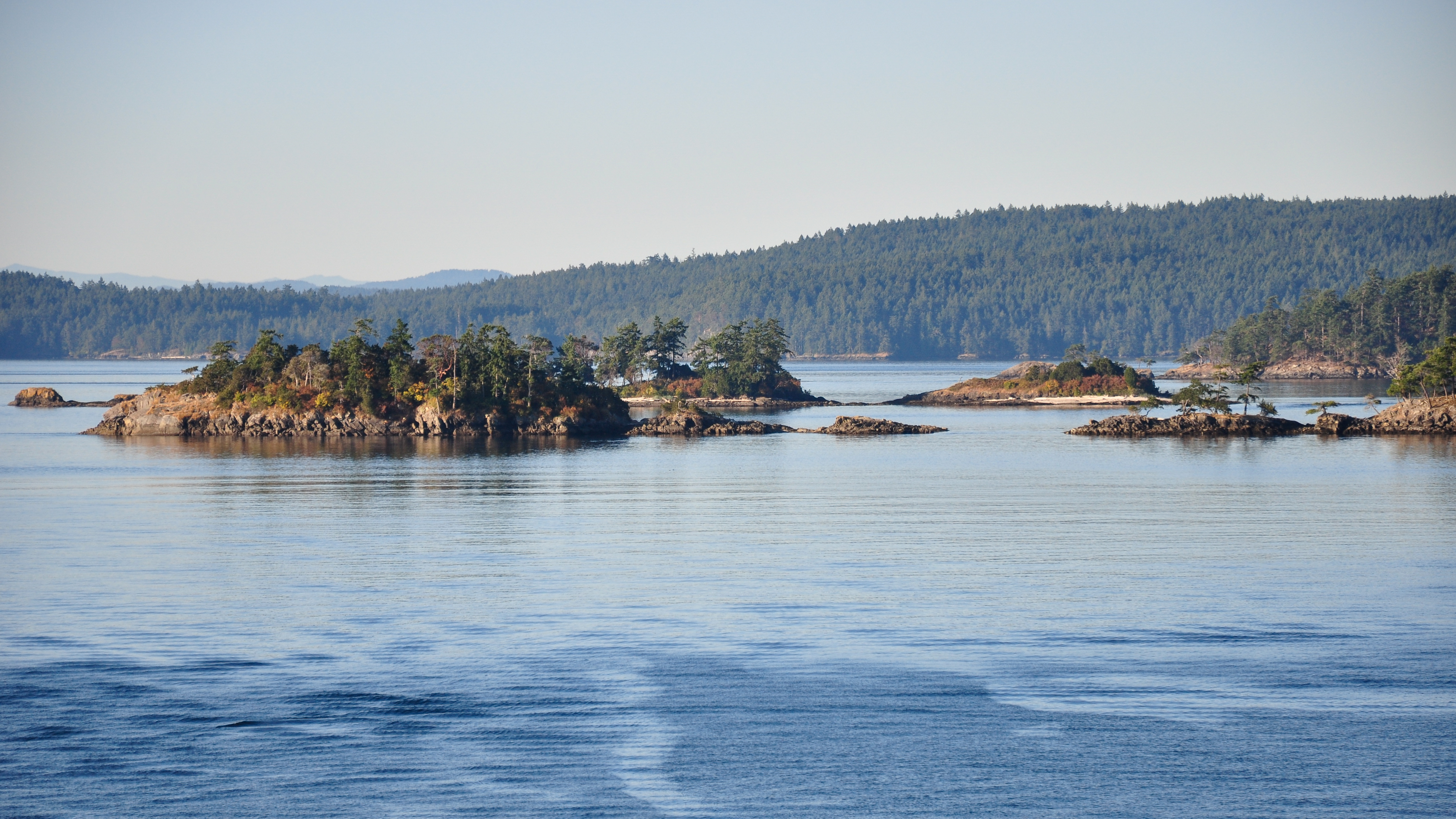
Forested islets and skerries of the Southern Gulf Islands

The Salish Sea contains more than 400 islands, most of which can be grouped into one of three island groups: the Discovery Islands, Gulf Islands, and San Juan Islands.

Whidbey Island in Washington is the largest and most populous island with a total area of 436.9 km^{2} (168.7 mi^{2}) and an estimated population of 69,480 as of 2010. Bainbridge Island, also in Washington, is the most densely populated island with 354 residents/km^{2} (916 residents/mi^{2}) as of 2019. The largest island by far on the Canadian side is Texada Island of 300.45 km^{2} (116.00 sq mi), but a population of 1000–2000 people.

== Geology ==
The Salish Sea sits within the Georgia Depression, a large depression that formed out of the collision of continental plates about 150 million years ago. The depression was then carved by the advance and retreat of the Cordilleran Ice Sheet during the Vashon Glaciation, which lasted from about 19,000 – 16,000 BP. The retreat of the ice sheet revealed a scarred landscape that filled in with sea water once it had retreated beyond what is now the Strait of Juan de Fuca.

== Ecology ==
=== Marine ===
The Salish Sea supports an active and dynamic marine ecosystem, dominated by species suited to the brackish, nutrient-rich, conditions. As with all marine food webs, the Salish Sea features a range of trophic groups, with autotrophic algae acting as primary producers. The fluvial systems draining British Columbia and Washington introduce large volumes of sediment and dissolved nutrients into the Salish Sea.

==== Flora ====
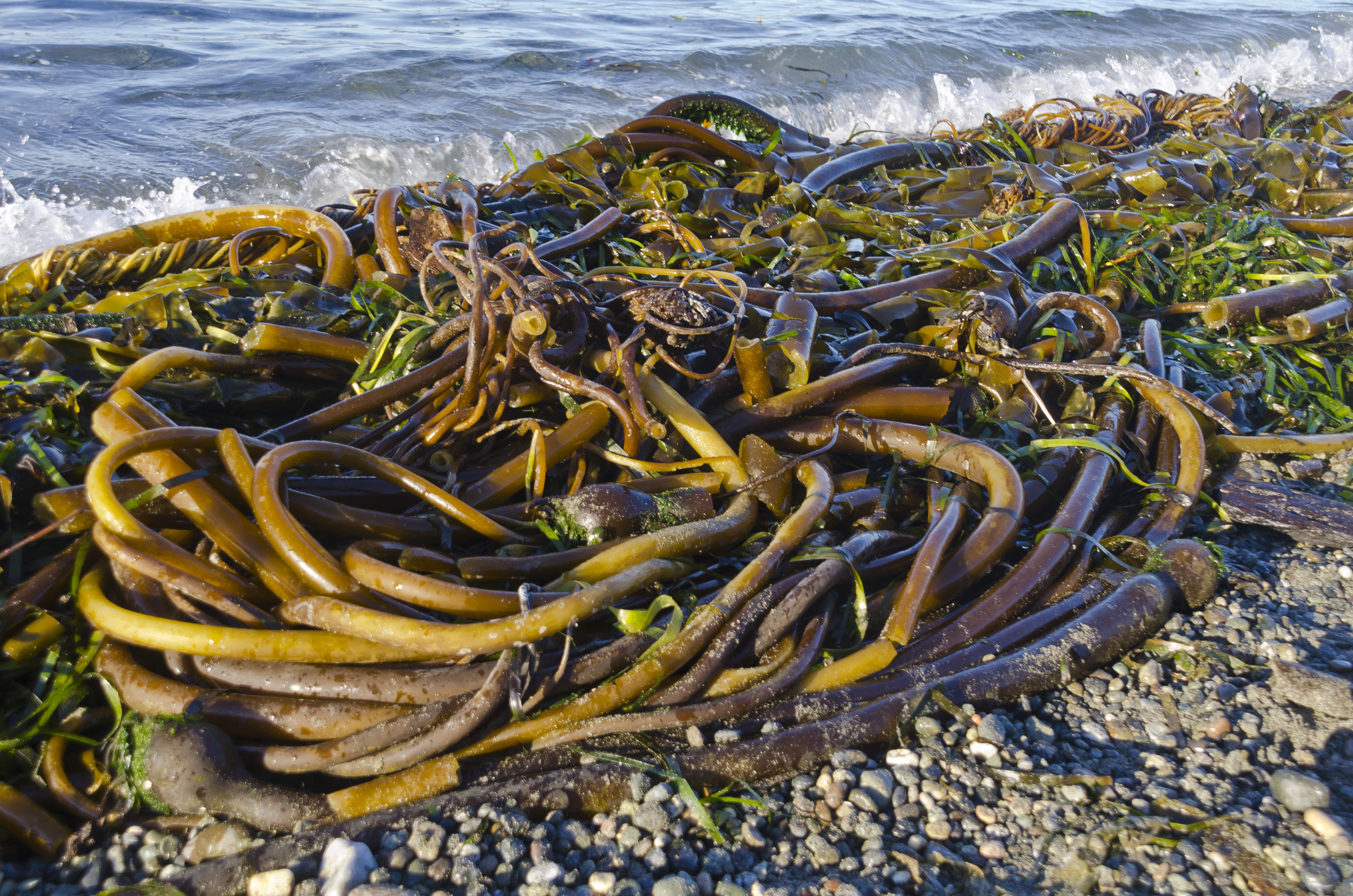
Bull kelp washed ashore near Victoria

The Salish Sea hosts a diverse community of kelp species that provide large volumes of high-quality habitat in areas with hard, rocky substrates. The largest of these kelp species include bull kelp and giant kelp.

Eelgrass meadows are abundant throughout the shallower regions of the sea.

==== Fauna ====
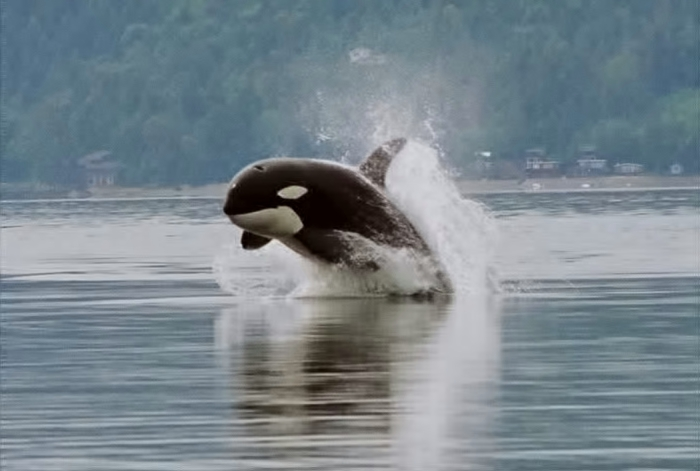
An orca breaching in Hood Canal

The Salish Sea is home to 253 fish species representing 78 families and 31 orders. These species encompass one myxinid, two petromyzontids, 18 chondrichthyans, two chondrosteans, and 230 teleosts.

In addition, the sea hosts 37 marine mammal species, most notably Steller sea lions, humpback whales, and killer whales (orcas). While mammal-eating transient orcas are gradually increasing in population, fish-eating southern resident orcas have struggled to survive due to low salmon populations and inbreeding. In 2019, this orca population was at a 35-year low after three adult deaths and no surviving calves over three years, leaving only 73 whales in the community. In 2021, an upsurge may occur in the humpback whale population with a record 21 humpback calves spotted in Salish waters.

Sea otters have been increasingly observed within the Strait of Juan de Fuca.

==== Sponge reefs ====
The mineral-rich waters of the Salish Sea are an ideal habitat for the formation of glass sponge reefs. These reefs were believed to have gone extinct during or shortly after the Cretaceous period, until a large collection of existing reefs were discovered off the British Columbia Coast in 1987. Due to their scientific and ecological importance, all known sponge reefs in the Salish Sea are protected from bottom-contact fishing activities.

=== Terrestrial ===
The lowlands surrounding the Salish Sea are part of the WWF-designated Puget lowland forests and Central Pacific coastal forests ecoregions.

Of the 172 bird species found in the area, 72 are highly dependent on the marine ecosystem for their food.

== Foot discoveries ==
Since August 20, 2007, at least 20 detached human feet have been found on the coasts of the Salish Sea. The first discovery, on August 20, 2007, was on Jedediah Island in British Columbia.
