= Walsh Cove Provincial Park =

Provincial park in British Columbia, Canada

- IUCN category II (national park)
- Location within Vancouver Island Location within British Columbia
- Interactive map of Walsh Cove Provincial Park
- Location: British Columbia, Canada
- Nearest city: Campbell River
- Coordinates: 50°16′04″N 124°48′10″W
- Area: 0.85 km^{2} (0.33 sq mi)
- Established: August 10, 1989
- Governing body: BC Parks

Walsh Cove Provincial Park is a provincial park located on the northeast corner of West Redonda Island in British Columbia, Canada. The park is approximately 85 ha. in size and overlooks Waddington Channel.
