= Roscoe Bay Provincial Park =

Provincial park in British Columbia, Canada

- IUCN category II (national park)
- Location within Vancouver Island Location within British Columbia
- Interactive map of Roscoe Bay Provincial Park
- Location: British Columbia, Canada
- Nearest city: Powell River
- Coordinates: 50°09′36″N 124°46′34″W
- Area: 2.42 km^{2} (0.93 sq mi)
- Established: August 10, 1989
- Governing body: BC Parks

Roscoe Bay Provincial Park is a provincial park in British Columbia, Canada, comprising the southeast portion of West Redonda Island, facing Desolation Sound and Waddington Channel.
