= Salish Sea human foot discoveries =

Detached human feet found on the Canadian coast

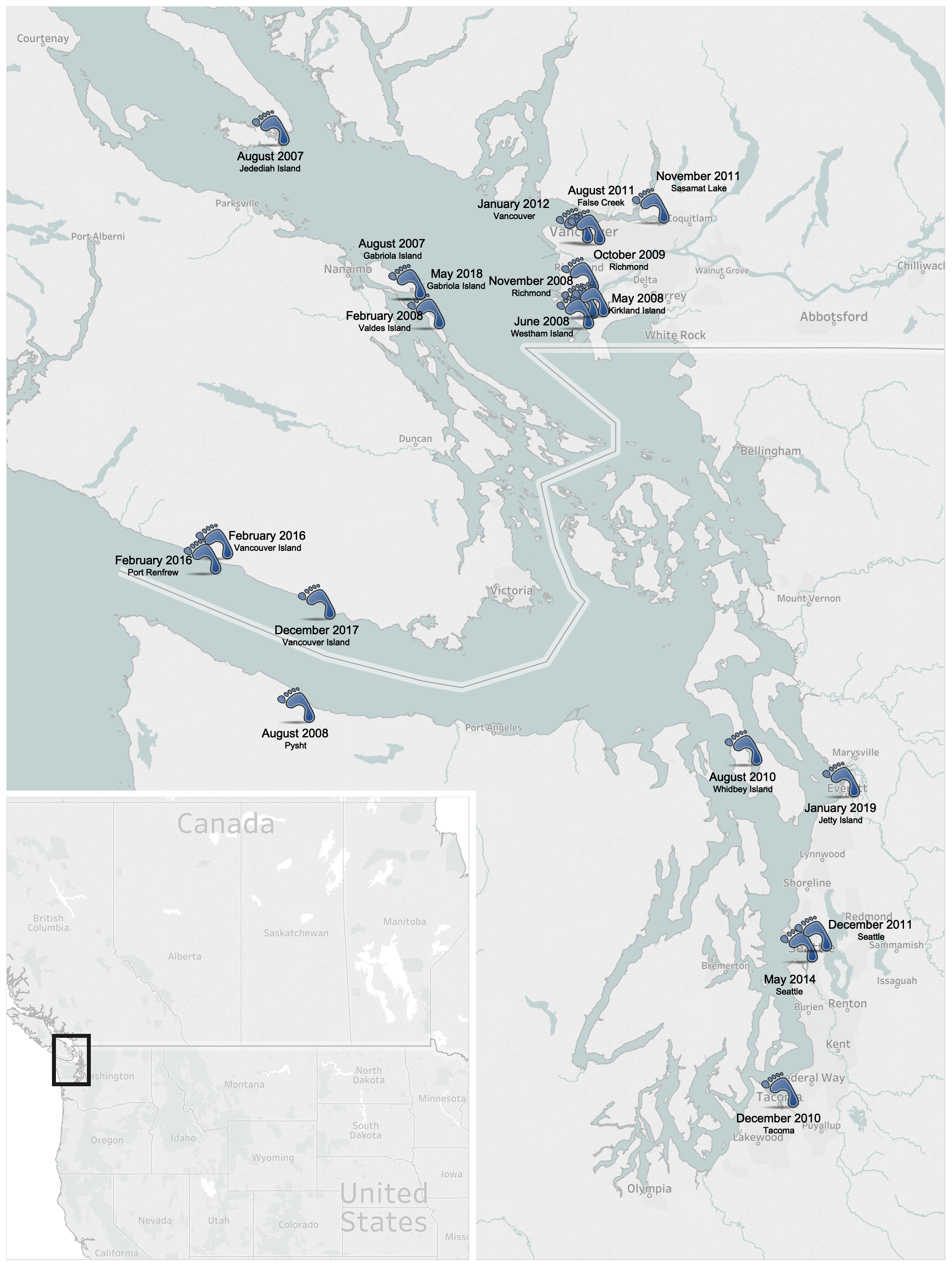
Locations of Salish Sea foot discoveries through January 3, 2019

Since August 20, 2007, at least 20 detached human feet have been found on the coasts of the Salish Sea in British Columbia, Canada, and Washington, United States of America. The first discovery, on August 20, 2007, was on Jedediah Island in British Columbia. Feet have been discovered on the coasts of islands in British Columbia and in the U.S. cities of Tacoma and Seattle.

In Canada, the British Columbia Coroners Service said in December 2017 that foul play had been ruled out by authorities in all previous cases. The feet were usually found in sneakers, which the coroner thought were responsible for both keeping the feet buoyant enough to eventually wash ashore, and for giving the feet enough protection from decomposition to be found relatively intact.

Prior to the recent rush of feet washing ashore, there have been earlier instances going back more than a century, such as a leg in a boot that was found on a Vancouver beach in 1887.

== Discoveries ==
These foot discoveries are not the first on British Columbia's coast. One was found in Vancouver in 1887, leading to the place of discovery being called Leg-In-Boot Square. On July 30, 1914, The Vancouver Sun reported that recent arrivals from Kimsquit reported a human leg encased in a high boot was found on a beach near the mouth of the Salmon River (a previous name for the Dean River near Kimsquit, near the headwaters of Dean Channel). It was thought the remains were from a man who had drowned on the river the previous summer.

As of September 2018, 15 feet have been found in the Canadian province of British Columbia between 2007 and 2018, and five in the U.S. state of Washington. The feet include a number of matched pairs.

In British Columbia, 13 of the 15 feet have been identified; the latest was a left foot found on the shore of a rocky beach in West Vancouver, B.C., in September 2018. Through DNA analysis, it was linked to a male that had gone missing earlier that year. Two more unidentified feet washed up on the shore of Botanical Beach on the West coast of Vancouver Island (adjacent to the Strait of Juan de Fuca) in February 2016.

In the U.S., one of these pairs belonged to a woman who jumped from a bridge. Of the two other U.S. feet identified, one foot belonged to a missing fisherman and the other to a depressed man who likely committed suicide. His identity was withheld on request of his family.

After a fifth foot was discovered (of the 20 eventually found) in June 2008, the story began to receive increased international media attention. With major headlines from newspapers such as the Melbourne Herald Sun, The Guardian, and the Cape Times in South Africa, the story elicited speculation about the cause of the mystery, originating from "morbid fascination" with this type of subject, as stated by one scientist who identifies remains of victims. On his late night talk show, David Letterman questioned two Canadian audience members about the mystery.

Another apparently human foot, discovered on June 18, 2008, on Tyee Spit near Campbell River on Vancouver Island, was a hoax. The hoax was a "skeletonized animal paw" which was put in a sock and shoe and then stuffed with dried seaweed. Royal Canadian Mounted Police launched an investigation.

After the 11th foot was found on August 31, 2011 in Vancouver, several running shoes containing what police suspected was raw meat were found washed up on Oak Beach, British Columbia.

== List of discoveries ==
#	Date	Location	Details	Coordinates
1	August 20, 2007	Jedediah Island, B.C.	A girl visiting from Washington picked up a size 12 Adidas shoe and opened the sock to find a man's right foot. It is thought to have become disarticulated due to submerged decay. This kind of shoe was produced in 2003 and distributed mainly in India. A man's right foot; size 12 white-and-blue-mesh running shoe. The remains were identified as those of a missing man suffering from depression.	49°29′55″N 124°12′15″W
2	August 26, 2007	Gabriola Island, B.C.	A man's right foot, discovered by a couple, also disarticulated due to decay. It was waterlogged and appeared to have been taken ashore by an animal. It probably floated ashore from the south. The shoe, a size 12 white Reebok, was produced in 2004 and sold worldwide but primarily in North America, and the type has since been discontinued.	49°09′00″N 123°43′59″W
3	February 8, 2008	Valdes Island, B.C.	A right foot in a size 11 Nike. The remains were identified as a 21-year-old Surrey man reported missing four years prior, whose death is considered "not suspicious", indicating either misadventure or suicide. This type of shoe was sold in Canada and the United States between February 1, 2003, and June 30, 2003. It has been confirmed that the right foot found February 8 on Valdes Island and left foot found on June 19 on Westham Island belonged to the same man.	49°05′00″N 123°40′00″W
4	May 22, 2008	Kirkland Island, B.C.	A woman's right foot; blue-and-white New Balance sneaker. The fourth foot was discovered on an island in the Fraser Delta between Richmond and Delta, British Columbia. It was also wearing a sock and sneaker. It is thought to have washed down the Fraser River, having nothing to do with the ones found in the Gulf Islands. The shoe was a New Balance sneaker manufactured in 1999. In 2011, the fourth sneaker found in Kirkland Island was identified as being part of a pair of blue and white New Balance sneakers belonging to a woman who jumped from the Pattullo Bridge in New Westminster in April 2004.	49°06′39″N 123°05′44″W
5	June 19, 2008	Westham Island, B.C.	A man's left foot was found by two hikers on June 19, floating in water in Delta. It has been confirmed that the left foot found on June 19 on Westham Island and the right foot found February 8 on Valdes Island belonged to the same man.	49°05′00″N 123°09′00″W
6	August 1, 2008	Near Pysht, Washington	A right foot inside a man's black size 11 shoe was discovered by a camper on a beach. It was covered in seaweed. The site of the discovery was less than 16 km from the international border in the Strait of Juan de Fuca. Testing confirmed that the foot was human. The large black-top, size 11 athletic shoe for a right foot contained bones and flesh. This was the first foot of the series to be found outside of British Columbia. The RCMP and Clallam County Sheriff's Department agreed on August 5 that the foot could have been carried south from Canadian waters. In March 2025, 16 years after its discovery, the foot was identified as belonging to Jeff Surtel, aged 17 at the time of his disappearance, through genetic genealogy. Surtel had been missing from Mission, British Columbia since April 29, 2007.	48°11′00″N 124°07′00″W
7	November 11, 2008	Richmond, B.C.	A known woman's left foot, in a shoe that was found floating in the Fraser River in Richmond. The shoe was described as a small New Balance running shoe, possibly a woman's shoe. A forensic DNA profiling analysis indicated that it was a genetic match to the foot discovered on May 22 on Kirkland Island.	49°06′29″N 123°07′55″W (approximate)
8	October 27, 2009	Richmond, B.C.	A right foot in a white size 8½ Nike running shoe was found near the Triangle Beach area of Richmond. The remains were identified as a Vancouver-area man who was reported missing in January 2008.	49°10′00″N 123°08′00″W (approximate)
9	August 27, 2010	Whidbey Island, Washington	A woman's or child's right foot, without a shoe or sock. This foot was determined to have been in the water for two months. Detective Ed Wallace of the Island County Sheriff's Office released a statement saying the foot would be tested for DNA. However, there was no match found in the national DNA database.	48°05′00″N 122°34′00″W
10	December 5, 2010	Tacoma, Washington	Found on the tidal flats. "The right foot was still inside a boy's size 6 'Ozark Trail' hiking boot, and likely belonged to a juvenile or small adult," police spokesman Mark Fulghum said Tuesday in Tacoma, about 40 km south of Seattle and 225 km south of Vancouver.	47°17′10″N 122°26′28″W (approximate)
11	August 30, 2011	False Creek, B.C.	Sex unknown. The foot was found in a men's white and blue size 9 runner, floating next to the Plaza of Nations marina, attached to the lower leg bones. It had disarticulated naturally at the knee due to the water.	49°16′30″N 123°06′36″W
12	November 4, 2011	Sasamat Lake, B.C.	A man's right foot inside a size 12 hiking boot was discovered by a group of campers in a pool of fresh water at Sasamat Lake near Port Moody. In January 2012, this foot was identified by the B.C. Coroner's Service as that of Stefan Zahorujko, a local fisherman who went missing in 1987. Police believe the foot separated naturally from the body and do not suspect foul play.	49°19′23″N 122°53′20″W
13	December 10, 2011	Lake Union, Seattle, Washington	Human leg bone and foot in a black plastic bag under the Ship Canal Bridge. As of January 2, 2012, the medical examiner had not found a cause of death or identified the body.	47°39′07″N 122°19′23″W
14	January 26, 2012	Vancouver, B.C.	On January 26, 2012, the remains of "what appears to be human bones inside a boot" were found in the sand along the water line at the dog park near the Maritime Museum at the foot of Arbutus Street, in Vancouver.	49°16′41″N 123°09′04″W
15	May 6, 2014	Seattle, Washington	Human foot in white New Balance shoe found along the shoreline of Centennial Park near the Pier 86 grain terminal. The New Balance model 622 athletic shoe was white with blue trim, size men's 10½. This model of shoe was first available for sale in April 2008. From an initial news photo, it appears to be a left foot.	47°37′34″N 122°22′23″W
16	February 7, 2016	Vancouver Island, B.C.	Hikers on Botanical Beach, near Port Renfrew on Vancouver Island, found a foot in a sock and running shoe.	48°31′48″N 124°26′42″W
17	February 12, 2016	Vancouver Island, B.C.	A foot washed up near Port Renfrew on Vancouver Island. B.C. Coroners Service said it matches one found there five days earlier.	48°31′48″N 124°26′42″W (approximate)
18	December 8, 2017	Vancouver Island, B.C.	Remains of a leg with a shoe attached washed up on the near the settlement of Jordan River on Vancouver Island. The remains were later identified as belonging to 79-year old Stanley K. Okumoto of Silverdale, Washington after DNA analysis.	48°25′14″N 124°02′41″W
19	May 6, 2018	Gabriola Island, B.C.	Shortly after noon on Sunday 6 May, a man walking along the shore on Gabriola Island encountered a hiking boot, with a human foot inside, wedged in a logjam.	49°09′00″N 123°43′59″W
20	September, 2018	West Vancouver, B.C.	Foot within a light grey Nike Free RN shoe on the shore near the 30th Street beach access point in West Vancouver. The size 9.5 shoe was manufactured between 1 February and 17 April 2017. It was believed to have been worn by a male and had a blue sock. The victim is believed to have been under the age of 50.	
21	January 1, 2019	Jetty Island, Everett, Washington	Foot found in a boot, later tied via DNA to Antonio Neill, missing since Dec. 12, 2016.	48°00′37″N 122°13′38″W
22	November 21, 2021	Locust Beach, Bellingham, Washington	A size 7 Brahma work boot was found washed up on Locust Beach, just west of the Bellingham city limits. Inside the boot was a tube sock containing the bones of a right foot. It was determined that these remains belonged to a male.	
23	December, 2021	Port Angeles, Washington	A size 8 New Balance shoe washed up on the mouth of the Elwha River. In 2021, it was determined that the foot belonged to Jerilyn L. Smith, who went missing from Sequim, Washington in January 2018 after a joint effort from Othram and the Clallam County Sheriff's Office.	
24	July 23, 2023	Gonzales Beach, Victoria, B.C	No details available publicly at this time. Sex unknown. The British Columbia Coroners Service (BCCS) are investigating.	
25	December 9, 2025	Port Williams Beach, Washington	A woman's Puma sneaker, approximately size 5 to 5.5, was found about 50 feet north of the Port Williams Beach boat launch. Forensic examination determined that the bone and tissue in the shoe were remains of a bear.	48°05′50″N 123°02′48″W (approximate)

== Level of rarity ==
Decomposition may separate the foot from the body because the ankle is relatively weak, while buoyancy caused by air either inside or trapped within a shoe would allow it to float away. The B.C. Coroners Service never found cut marks on any bones that suggest the feet were severed from the bodies. According to Simon Fraser University entomologist Gail Anderson, extremities such as the hands, feet, and head often detach as a body decomposes in water, but rarely float.

However, finding feet and not the rest of the bodies has been deemed unusual. Finding two feet has been guessed at "million to one odds" and has thus been referred to as "an anomaly" by one police officer.

== In popular culture ==
In his novel Dregs (2011), the Norwegian award-winning author Jørn Lier Horst gives a fictional explanation for the foot findings.

The fictional podcast Tanis mentions the phenomenon, even interviewing a character who has been DNA-matched to a foot discovered on the beach, though he still has both feet. it is implied the mysterious area of Tanis may be responsible.

The 2020 novel Crooked River by Douglas Preston and Lincoln Child begins with severed feet found on a beach inspired by this event.

The episode "The Feet on the Beach" of the American crime-procedural comedy-drama Bones aired April 7, 2011, where eight pairs of detached feet were discovered on the U.S.-Canada border.

The February 24, 2015 episode of the TV series Rizzoli & Isles called "Foot Loose" about various body parts washing up near Boston, showed a map of the Salish Sea area foot discoveries as part of their establishing act.

Popular podcast Stuff You Should Know (also known as SYSK) had an episode about the disembodied feet specifically in British Columbia. It was released June 14, 2016.

In the third episode of Netflix's Dead Boy Detectives, one of the ghosts brings up the phenomenon as a case for the main cast.

== See also ==
- List of unsolved deaths
