= Pendrell Sound =

- Location within British Columbia

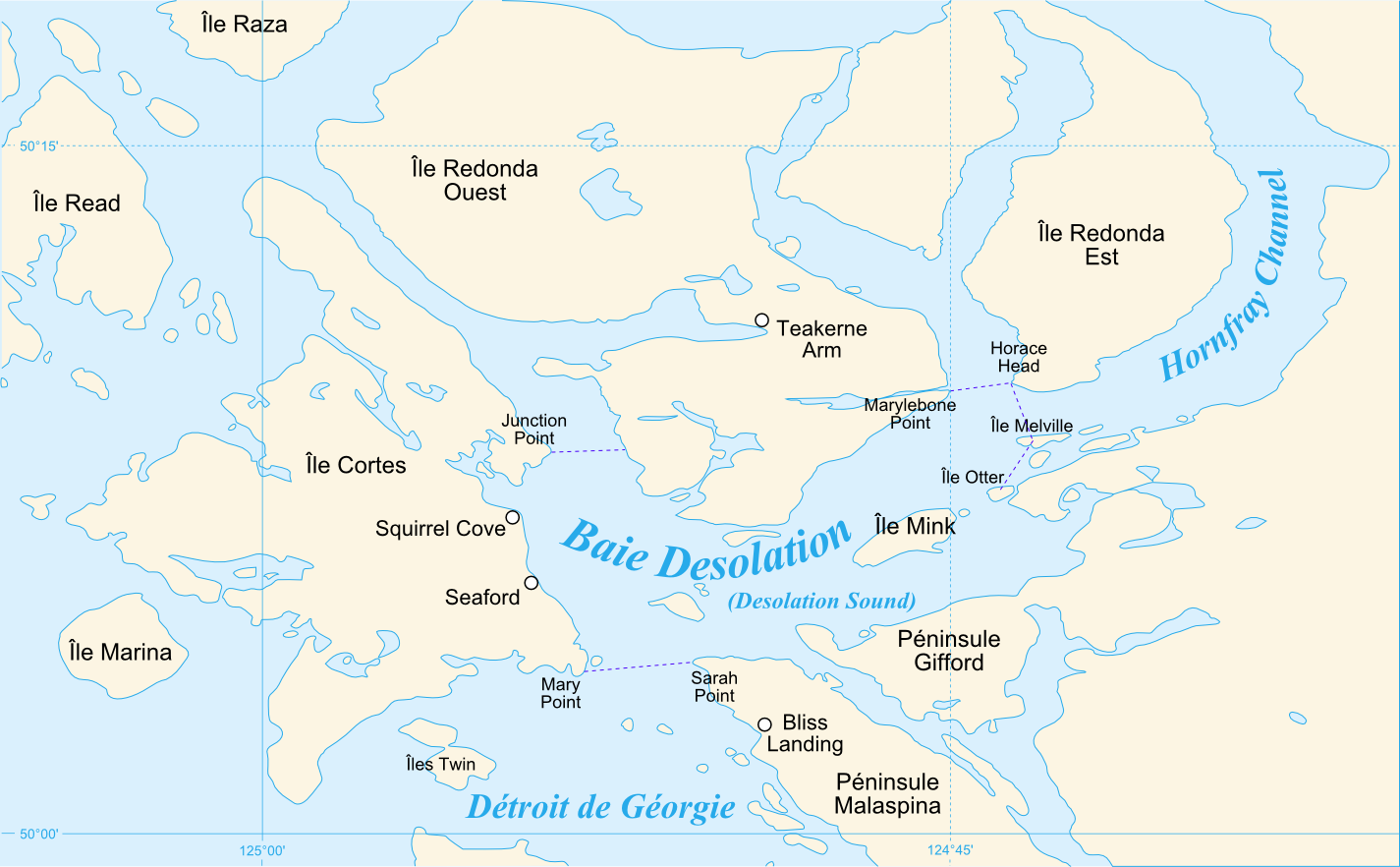
- Pendrell Sound deeply incises East Redonda Island (top right)
- Location: East Redonda Island, British Columbia
- Coordinates: 50°15′00″N 124°43′00″W
- Type: Sound
- Part of: Waddington Channel
- Ocean/sea sources: Salish Sea
- References: "Pendrell Sound". BC Geographical Names. Government of British Columbia – B.C. Geographical Names Office (BCGNO).

Pendrell Sound is a sound located in the Discovery Islands in British Columbia, Canada. The sound branches off from Waddington Channel and deeply incises East Redonda Island.

The northern limit of Pendrell Sound delineates part of the northern limit of the Salish Sea.
