= Blubber Bay =

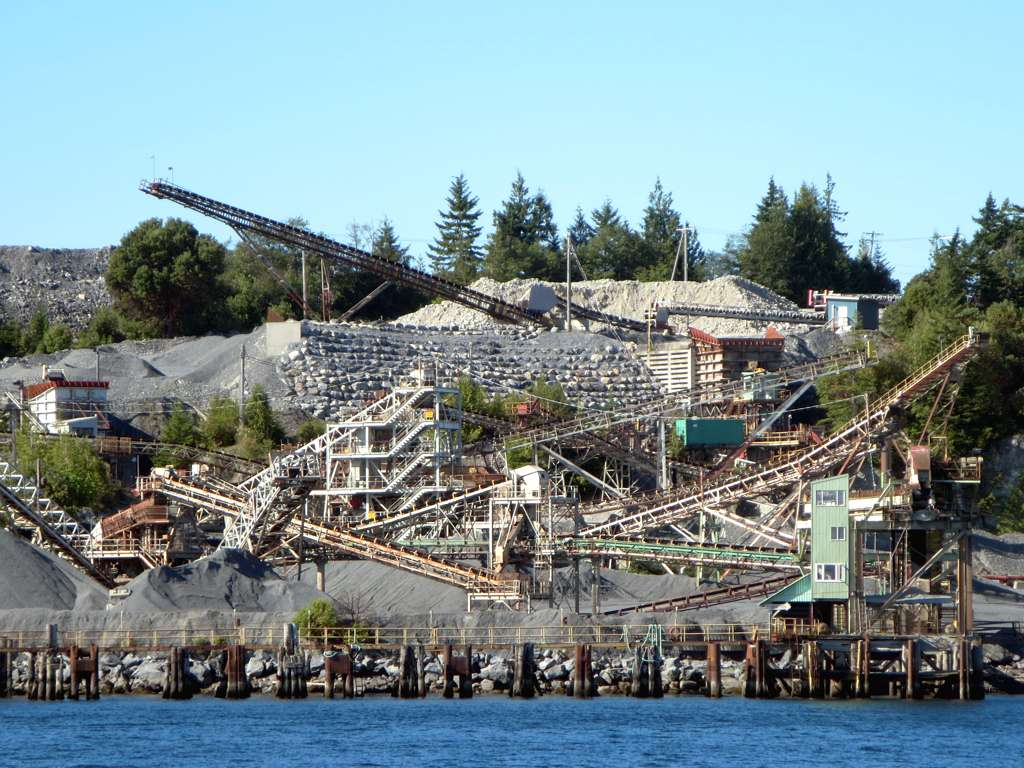

- Location of Blubber Bay in British Columbia
- Coordinates: 49°47′00″N 124°37′00″W
- Country: Canada
- Province: British Columbia
- Time zone: UTC−07:00 (PT)
- Area codes: 250, 778

Blubber Bay is an unincorporated settlement on the northern end of Texada Island at the bay of the same name in the northern Gulf of Georgia on the South Coast of British Columbia, Canada. The ferry from Powell River docks at Blubber Bay, which sits beside quarry offices, pits and workings which stretch up the hill. The north rim of the bay has the disused workings of BC Cement Company with dock, work area, and various pits stretching out to the headland. There is a museum and archives and a small store located above the ferry landing.

== Geography ==
Texada Island is one of the Northern Gulf Islands, and lies across Malaspina Strait from the town of Powell River, British Columbia; Georgia Strait lies along its western shores. Texada's other main community is Van Anda, on the island's east coast, which was an iron mining company town.

== History ==
Blubber Bay was a whaling station in the heyday of that industry on the British Columbia Coast, where blubber was sliced up (flensing) and rendered (try pot) from captured cetaceans.

In 1970 there were 35 families living in a small company town owned by Domtar Chemical Company, quarrying limestone for concrete manufacture.
