= Waddington Channel =

Strait in British Columbia, Canada

- Location within British Columbia

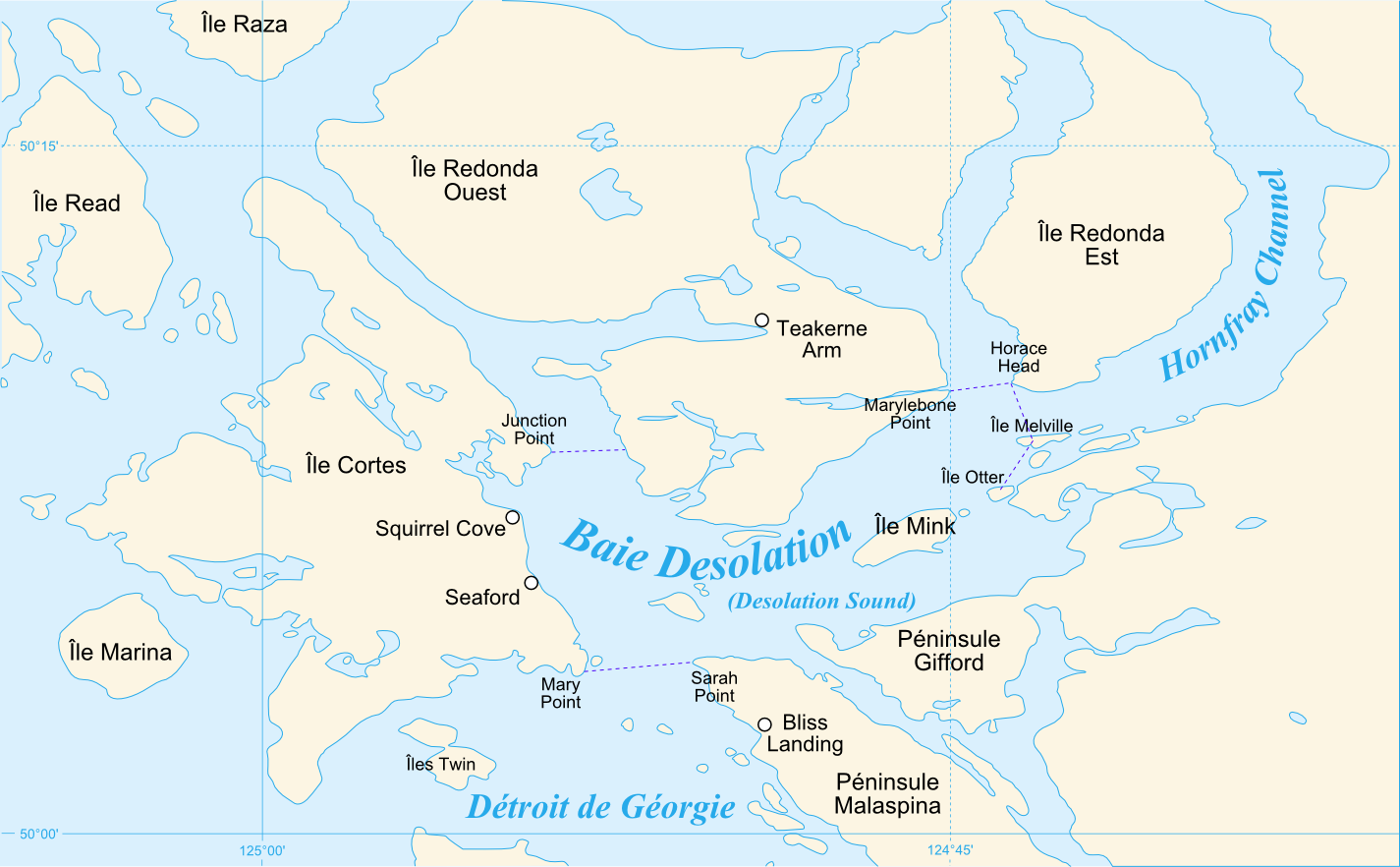
- Waddington Channel is located between East Redonda and West Redonda Island
- Location: Discovery Islands, British Columbia
- Coordinates: 50°12′36″N 124°46′53″W
- Type: Strait
- Ocean/sea sources: Salish Sea

Waddington Channel is a strait located between East Redonda and West Redonda Island of the Discovery Islands in British Columbia, Canada.

== Geography ==
Waddington Channel connects Desolation Sound to the south with Pryce Channel to the north. Pendrell Sound branches off of the main channel to the northeast, deeply incising East Redonda Island.

The channel contains two major islands: Allies Island and Elworthy Island.

=== Hydrology ===
The northern hydrological limit of Waddington Channel delineates part of the northern limit of the Salish Sea.

== Conservation ==
Notable provincial parks and protected located within Waddington Channel include:

- East Redonda Island Ecological Reserve
- Roscoe Bay Provincial Park
- Walsh Cove Provincial Park

== See also ==
- Lewis Channel
- Homfray Channel
