= Kirkland Island =

Island in British Columbia, Canada

Geography of Kirkland Island
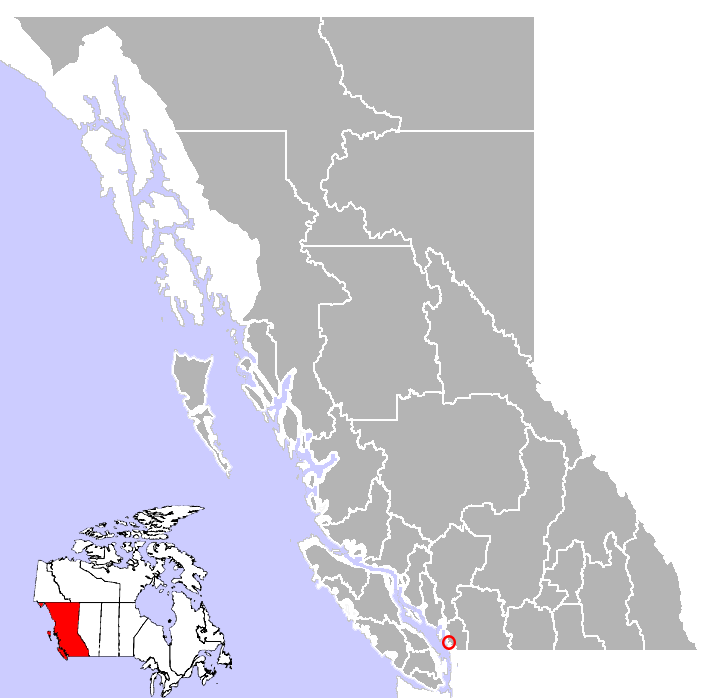
- Continent: North America
- Region: Lower Mainland British Columbia
- Coordinates: 49°06′42.3″N 123°06′07.6″W to 49°06′53.1″N 123°05′09.7″W
- Lowest point: Sea Level

Kirkland Island, also known as Rose-Kirkland Island, is located within the municipality of Richmond, British Columbia and is part of a small alluvial archipelago known as the South Arm Marshes located within the Ladner Reach of the South Arm of the Fraser River in British Columbia, Canada. It is the northernmost island of the group and lies between Richmond on Lulu Island in the north and Delta and Ladner town centre in the south.

The island is predominantly alluvial in nature and is approximately 1.5 miles long. It is separated from Rose Island to the south by a narrow tidal channel; they are sometimes collectively referred to as Rose-Kirkland Island. It is uninhabited and is under the management of the Kirkland Island Waterfowl Society, which does not allow public access. The entire archipelago, comprising Kirkland, Woodward, Barber, Duck, Rose, Gunn and Williamson Islands, falls within the Agricultural Land Reserve and is under the administration of the British Columbia Ministry of Environment, designated as the South Arm Marshes Wildlife Management Area.

Since 2008, Kirkland Island has been noted for the ongoing presence of disarticulated human feet, most recently in February 2016.

In February, 2009, Ducks Unlimited Canada (DUC) and Port Metro Vancouver (PMV) announced completion of an intertidal enhancement project increasing fish habitat at Rose-Kirkland Island. PMV contributed $1.5 million as part of a multi-year plan to offset loss of wildlife habitat from the development of the Deltaport Third Berth Project (DP3). The Rose-Kirkland Island project included breaching Fraser River dikes to create an intertidal environment; raising the elevation of a kilometre of dike to mitigate flooding of the fields on the island; excavating the pool area to facilitate tidal flushing; and upgrading 250 metres of rock riprap along the foreshore to protect against erosion due to waves caused by Fraser River boat traffic.

== Ownership history ==
Kirkland Island derives its name from Ladner resident John Kirkland, who with his descendants were prominent landholders in the Surrey and Delta area.

Until 1960, Kirkland and Rose islands were privately owned by HR McMillan, when ownership was transferred to Kirkland Island Waterfowl Society. In 1989, The Nature Trust along with the Pacific Estuary Conservation Program partners purchased the islands and subsequently leased it to the B.C. Ministry of Environment. The ministry, in turn, licensed annual agriculture management and production to the Kirkland Island Waterfowl Society to attract and support migrant waterfowl. In exchange, the society received exclusive use of the islands as a hunting club.

== Fauna ==
Many animal species, both endemic and transient, frequent Kirkland Island and the South Arm Marshes. They include:

- Loons and grebes. The South Arm Marshes are frequented by many loon and grebe species, especially during spring and fall migrations. The most easily observed are the common loon, red-throated loon, horned grebe, red-necked grebe and western grebe.
- Great blue herons. Herons are easily seen throughout the year.
- Ducks and geese. Many reside in the South Arm Marshes year-round, but the largest concentrations are observed during the spring and fall migrations. The most common species include mallard ducks and northern pintail ducks, green-winged teal and American wigeon. Snow geese are present in large numbers on the west portion of the area in March and April.
- Bald eagles. Bald eagles nest throughout the Fraser River estuary.
- Hawks. Concentrations of hawks are greatest during migratory waterfowl stopovers. Hawk species include northern harrier hawk, red-tailed hawk, sharp-shinned hawk and Cooper's hawk.
- Falcons. Peregrine falcons are often seen hunting shorebirds and waterfowl.
- Shorebirds. During low tides, mud flats and marsh areas are frequented by shorebirds, especially during the migration periods.
- Songbirds. Passerine species may be observed throughout the year. The greatest diversity of songbirds occurs in late spring and through the summer. Easily observed are the marsh wren, red-winged blackbird and song sparrow.
- Mammals. The South Arm Marshes are home to both beaver and muskrat. Raccoons and mink may also be observed.
- Seals and sea lions. The channels of the Fraser River are frequented by harbour seals throughout the year, and in the spring by California sea lions. These species are most visible during fish runs.

== Flora ==
Rare plant elements appearing in the WMA include Henderson's checker-mallow (Sidalcea hendersonii), rice cutgrass (Leersia oryzoides) and Western St. John's wort (Hypericum scouleri).
