= South Texada Island Provincial Park =

Provincial park in British Columbia, Canada

- IUCN category II (national park)
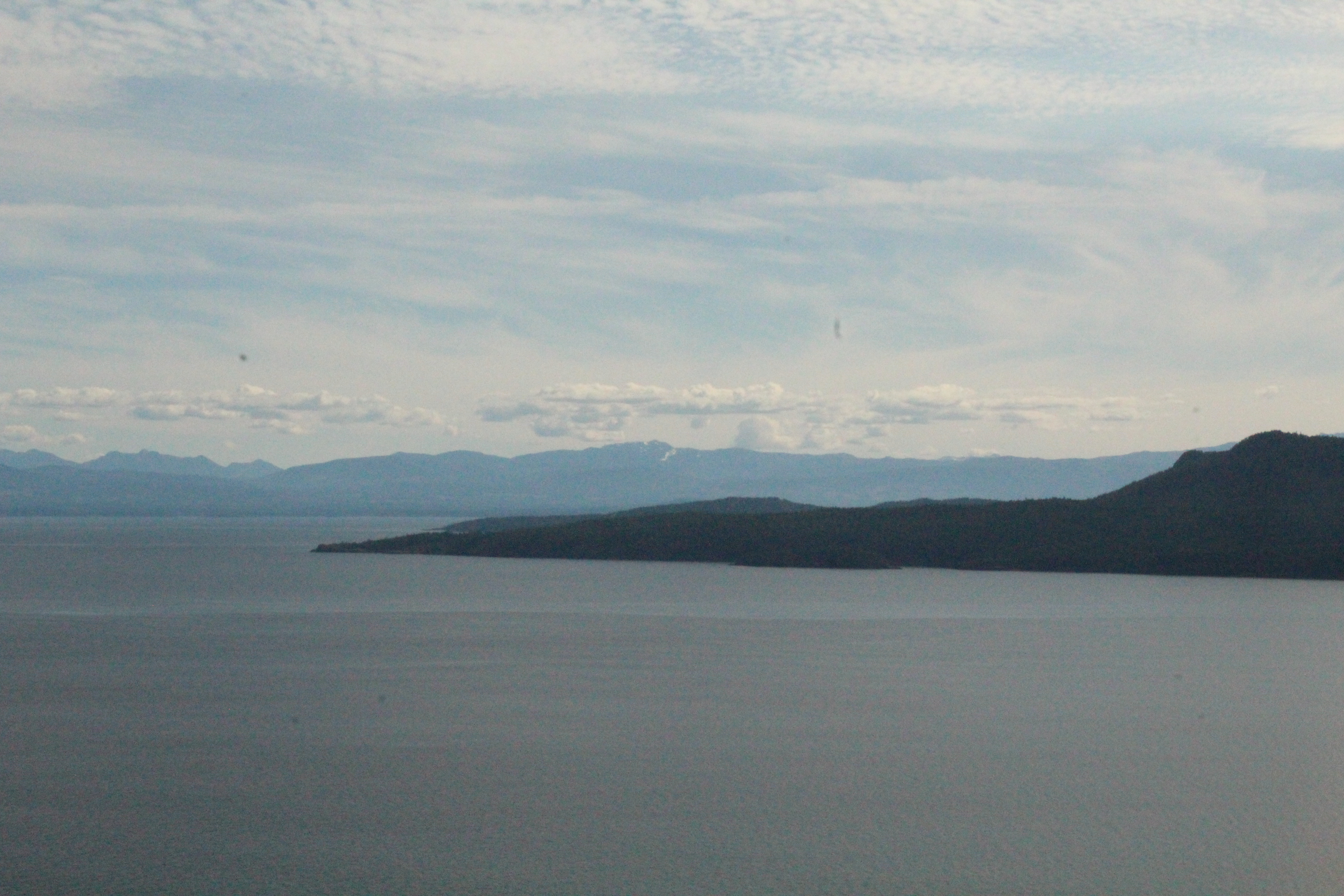
- Panoramic view

- Location within Vancouver Island Location within British Columbia
- Interactive map of South Texada Island Provincial Park
- Location: British Columbia, Canada
- Nearest city: Sechelt
- Coordinates: 49°31′15″N 124°10′41″W
- Area: 9 km^{2} (3.5 sq mi)
- Established: July 23, 1997
- Governing body: BC Parks

South Texada Island Provincial Park is a provincial park in British Columbia, Canada. It is located on the SouthWest side of Texada Island. Created in 1997, the park is approximately 900 hectares (2,200 acres) in area.

== See also ==
- "South Texada Island Park". BC Geographical Names. Government of British Columbia – B.C. Geographical Names Office (BCGNO).
