= Texada Island =

Island in the Strait of Georgia in British Columbia, Canada

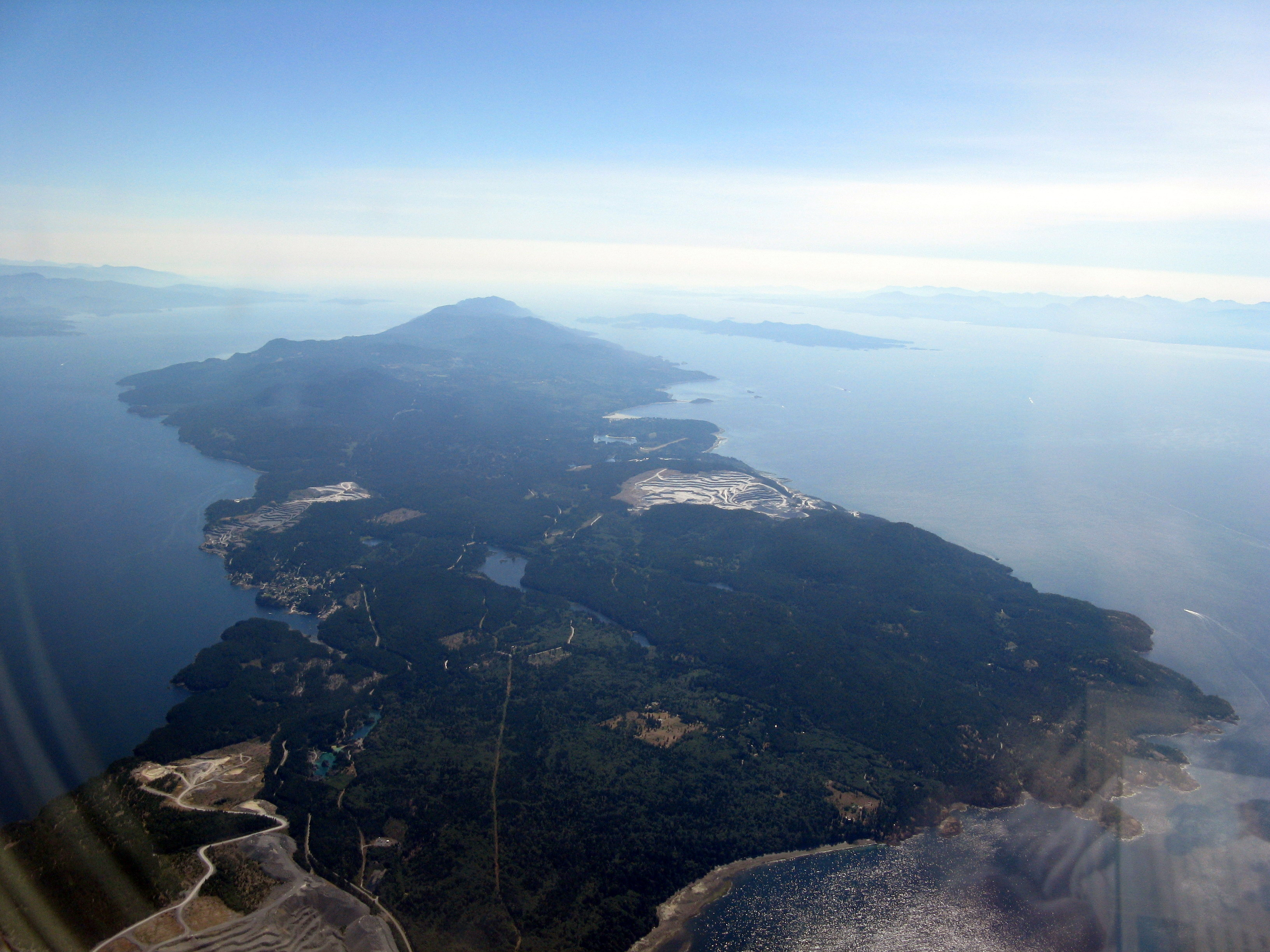
- Bird's-eye view of Texada Island

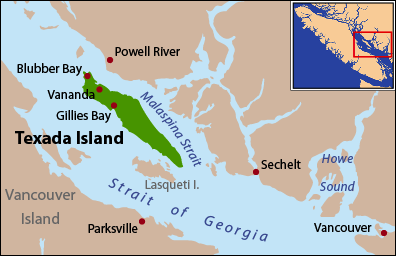
- Texada Island (highlighted)

Geography
- Location: British Columbia, Canada
- Coordinates: 49°40′N 124°25′W
- Archipelago: Northern Gulf Islands
- Area: 300.45 km^{2} (116.00 sq mi)
- Length: 50 km (31 mi)
- Width: 10 km (6 mi)
- Highest elevation: 852 m (2795 ft)
- Highest point: Mount Shepherd

Texada Island is a large island located in the Strait of Georgia of British Columbia, Canada. With an area of 300.45 km^{2} (116.00 mi^{2}), it is the largest island of the Gulf Islands and the third largest island in the Strait of Georgia after Whidbey Island in Washington and Quadra Island of the Discovery Islands. Once a major mining and logging centre home to a fairly large population, Texada's industry has largely disappeared and its population shrank since the decline began in the 1950s. In the present, it is mostly recognized as an out-of-the-way cottage and camping destination known for its warm waters and scenic beaches.

== History ==
Texada was named by the Spanish naval explorer José María Narváez for Felix de Tejada, a Spanish rear-admiral during the 1791 expedition of Francisco de Eliza. Narváez gave the name Isla de Texada to what is now called Lasqueti Island, and Islas de San Felix to Texada Island. The maps made by Eliza and Juan Carrasco in late 1791 moved the name "Texada" to the present Texada Island. At the time of Confederation the north end of the island became a fishing outport.

Copper was discovered at Van Anda about 1898 by Olive and Harry Treat creating the Cornell Mine rich in copper and gold. A smelter, tramway and town were constructed. The community was named after Carrie Van Anda, wife of American mining capitalist Edward Blewett. J. D. Rockefeller invested in the iron mines, though he quickly sold having lost money on a Monte Cristo, Washington venture near Everett. The iron mines were picked up by the famed Union Iron Works of San Francisco. Canadian investors Sir William Mackenzie and Donald Mann also speculated in the Van Anda mines. Farms, orchards, logging and a sawmill were set up on Texada at this time as well. By the turn of the century, the copper boom was in full swing but the mines only yielded for a few years. Van Anda hosted an opera house and a Chinatown. A series of fires demolished the Van Anda townsite—the last in 1917. Sail races were also run from Vancouver to Van Anda around this time.

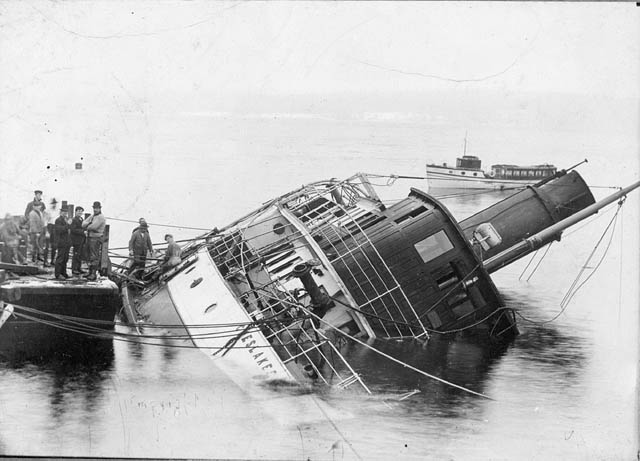
Cheslakee capsized at Van Anda, British Columbia, January 22, 1913.

Coastal ferries connected the island with the nearby cities of Vancouver and Nanaimo. The first ferry to the island, after the discontinued Union steamships, was the Atrevida. The Union Steamship Company of British Columbia steamship Cheslakee capsized off Van Anda on January 22, 1913, with the loss of seven lives. The famous BC sternwheeler R.P. Rithet was beached in Stuart Bay in 1923.

On November 6, 2004, the tug Manson, skippered by Dusty Davison, sank off Texada Island.

== Geography ==
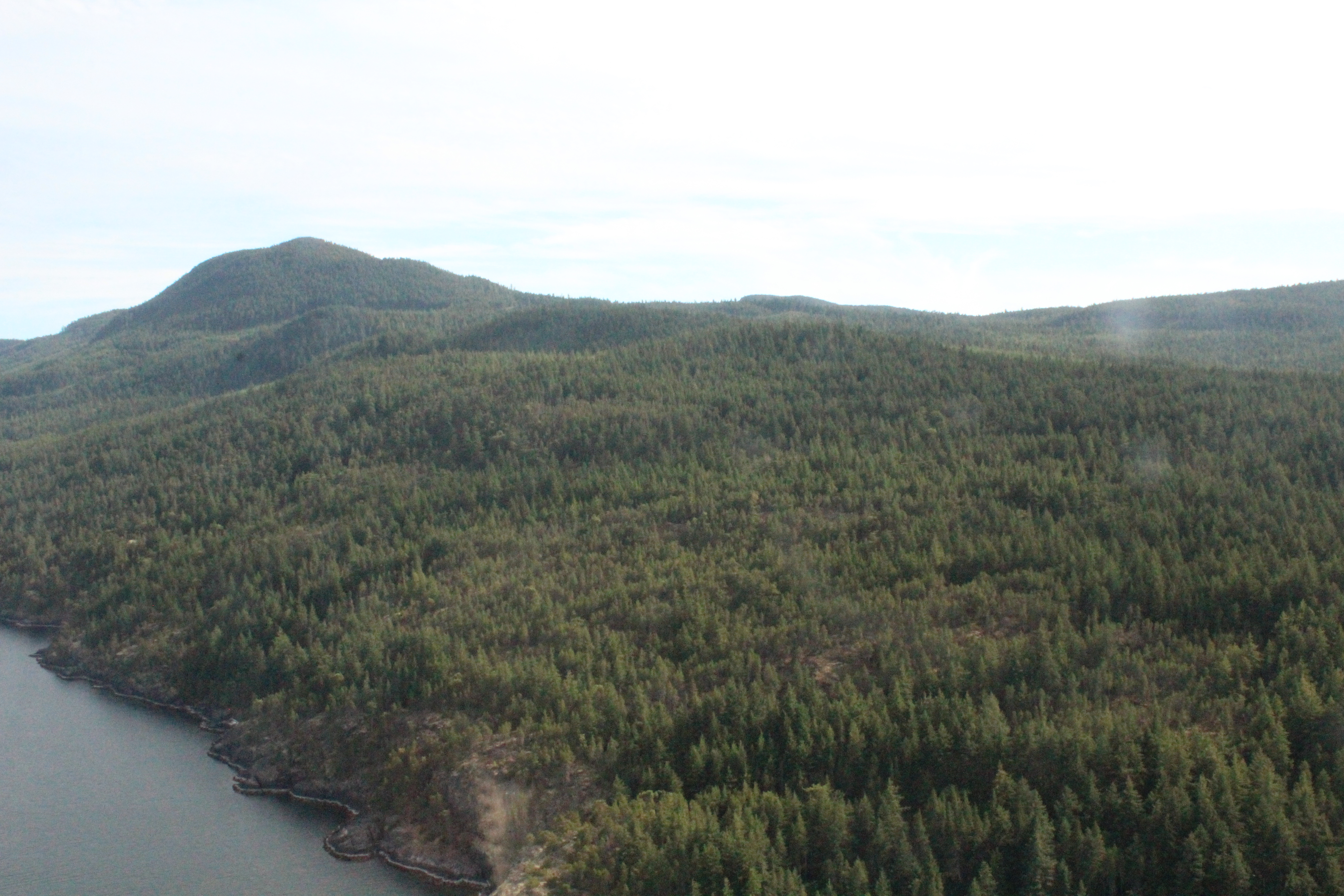
Texada Island

Texada Island is largest of the Northern Gulf Islands at some 50 kilometres (31 mi) in length and 10 kilometres (6.2 mi) in width, with its length aligned along a northwest–southeast axis. The northern tip is located about 8 kilometres (5.0 mi) southwest of the city of Powell River and west of the Sechelt Peninsula on the Sunshine Coast. Texada is separated from the mainland and Nelson Island by Malaspina Strait on its northeast and from Lasqueti Island by Sabine Channel along its southwestern flank. Off its northwestern end it is separated from Ahgykson Island by Algerine Passage and is flanked by the Strait of Georgia on ¾ of its western side.

Other islands in the archipelago are Lasqueti, Jedediah, Ahgykson, Nelson, Hernando, and Savary Islands. Many smaller islands and rocks also dot the shoreline of Texada, particularly on the southwest shore.

The island's interior is completely forested and contains several mountains. Many lakes of various size also dot the Island with Priest Lake being the largest.

The highest point on Texada Island is the summit of Mount Shepherd, near the southeastern most point on the island, and rising 852 m above sea level.

=== Geology ===
Texada has a combination of light and soil conditions suitable for market agriculture.

== Flora and fauna ==
A wide variety of plants and animals can be observed in the islands forests, waters and sky.

Texada Island is home to most of the plant species that are native to the coastal area of British Columbia. However its forest differs from neighbouring coastal areas for containing large amount of the inland variant of lodgepole pine (rather than the coast variant); the species can be found in record breaking sizes with trunks over half a meter in diameter and trees 60 meters tall or more. Douglas fir and red alder are also dominant trees in the island's forests. Red cedar, Western white pine, Sitka spruce, Western hemlock, grand fir and bigleaf maple exist in smaller proportions. Arbutus is common along the ocean, but not seen in the interior. The underbrush is formed by hundreds of shrub species with Sword Fern and Deer Fern being the most common.

Large animals native to the island consist of only a small variant of the black-tailed Sitka deer. Unlike neighbouring islands and the mainland, Texada historically does not have any predatory mammals such wolves, cougars or bears. As a result, the deer population is dense compared to most neighbouring areas, and they are frequently seen along the island's roads. The high deer population also has made Texada a popular hunting location in the fall. However, in May–June 2025, a grizzly bear was spotted on Texada Island after swimming across Malaspina Straight from Powell River. This trend is expected to continue. Raccoons and rats have been accidentally introduced to the island. Garter snakes are common in all areas and fresh water turtles exist in small quantities in some of the island's lakes. Large birds such as bald eagles, turkey vultures, ravens and various species of hawk are plentiful in the area.

The Strait of Georgia surrounding the island is commonly fished for many species including all five species of Oncorhynchus (Pacific salmon), Lingcod, Rock cod and coastal cutthroat trout. Inland lakes also are home to several species of trout and a unique variant of stickleback native only to the island. The island's larger streams have small salmon runs. Various species of seal have breeding colonies on the shores of Texada Island and neighbouring rocks; sea otters are rare, but sometimes can be spotted. Orcas, which commonly feed on the seals, are the only large marine mammal that are seen extremely close to the island's shore. Other whale and dolphin species do migrate through the strait, but are rarely seen near land.

== Parks and tourism ==
Texada Island is a mildly popular tourist destination, mainly during the summer and fall. It is known for fishing, hunting, birdwatching, waterfront camping, and kayaking. It also has superb hiking and swimming in certain locations. The water around the island can get as warm as 20 degrees in the summer, making it popular for water sports.

Several regional parks and forestry sites provide camping, some more remote than others. Shelter Point Regional Park, located south of Gillies Bay is a popular and scenic camping location with a boat launch. Shingle beach is a more remote campground in an equally picturesque location and a popular swimming spot. Bobs Lake and Anderson Bay are very remote camping locations far up logging roads with the latter requiring a 3-hour drive from the ferry terminal on long sections of 4x4 roads.

Two provincial parks exist on the southern tip of the island: Anderson Bay Provincial Park and South Texada Island Provincial Park. Anderson Bay can be accessed on a long dirt track that crosses from the end of the gravel road at Bob's lake to the south point. 4x4 is a must as this route has deteriorated over the years; driving the final 15 km takes an hour and a half. South Texada Park is only accessible by boat or a long bushwhack.

== Demographics and services ==
The three main settlements are Gillies Bay, Blubber Bay and Van Anda, all located on the north half of the island. The major roads between the settlements also have numerous acreages and larger farms on them; many homes on the island are vacation properties and are only inhabited part of the year. The water at Gillies Bay is provided by the nearby Cranby Lake. A small settlement called Anderson Bay formerly existed on the south tip of the island, but the last resident moved in the 2000s and the area has been overgrown. This leaves the southern half of the island virtually deserted with only a single dirt track connecting it to the populated north half. According to the demographic report the permanent population is estimated to be around 1200 and is expected to shrink.

Unlike all islands in the Strait of Georgia to the south and west, Texada Island is not part of the Islands Trust.

The island has two stores, a library, a Credit Union, a gas station, an elementary school, a hotel, bed and breakfasts, a cemetery, two museums, two firehalls, two thrift stores, an R.C.M.P. Detachment, an Ambulance station, and two post offices. On top of the main stores and hotel, several farms on the island sell produce to tourists, and there is a yearly summer farmers' market.

== Transportation ==
Vehicle, bike and foot access to the island from Powell River is provided by 10 daily sailings on the Island Discovery (formerly the North Island Princess) operated by BC Ferries. The Texada Island Ferry Terminal is located in Blubber Bay. As part of a pilot project dubbed the "triangle run", BC Ferries offered a sailing from the island directly to Comox on the Salish Eagle; but was removed in response to the COVID-19 pandemic which reduced travel volumes.

Texada Island is serviced by the Texada/Gillies Bay Airport located near Gillies Bay. It has a 3,000-foot-long (910-metre) paved runway for private aircraft and chartered flights. The now defunct KD Air formerly operated scheduled flights to Gillies Bay Airport from Vancouver and Qualicum Beach. An airport with a dirt runway formerly existed at Anderson Bay on the south tip of the island, but has long been overgrown.

The island has two major roads, Gillies Bay Road and Blubber Bay road, both meet small rural highway design criteria and are two lanes. Smaller paved roads connect to the quarries, airport, Shelter Point Park and serve residents in the communities. There is a high road that can be accessed from Van Anda going to the other half of the island, the "high road". The other more remote areas of the island are accessed by roads ranging from gravel to dirt. Access to the southern half of the island, including the former settlement of Anderson Bay, is becoming increasingly difficult as the single dirt rut access road has deteriorated over the years.

== Industry ==
Once a major mining and logging area, the island's industry had largely shrunk resulting in a population decline. Only a few quarries and some small scale logging operations remain active in the present providing the island with its main source of employment. The island once produced 5 million tons of limestone a year; however, recent economic factors have lowered demand.

A BC Hydro 500 kV powerline known as the Cheekye-Dunsmuir Line was built in 1982 running east to west across the middle of the Island, linking two sections of underwater transmission line that deliver power to Vancouver Island. A FortisBC natural gas pipeline, built in 1989, runs from south to north, where it splits, providing gas to Powell River and Vancouver Island.

=== LNG controversy ===
In 2007, Westpac LNG announced that it intended to build a liquefied natural gas (LNG) receiving terminal, and a gas-fired electricity generation project, at Kiddie Point on the north end of Texada. Controversy surrounding the project ramped up quickly: the year also witnessed the re-introduction of Texada Action Now by Texada residents, and the formation of the Alliance to Stop LNG, comprising a large number of conservation, environmental, community and labour groups around the Georgia Basin. As of summer 2009, the project was shelved for the time being due to the global economic downturn.

== Notable people ==
- Jennifer Tilly, Canadian-American actress and professional poker player.
- Meg Tilly, Canadian-American actress
- Frank Giustra, Canadian businessman, mining financier and global philanthropist
