= Megacryometeor =

Type of precipitation

A megacryometeor is a very large chunk of ice which, despite sharing many textural, hydro-chemical, and isotopic features found in large hailstones, is formed under unusual atmospheric conditions which clearly differ from those of the cumulonimbus cloud scenario (e.g. clear-sky conditions). They are sometimes called huge hailstones, but do not need to form under thunderstorm conditions unlike hailstorms.

== Mass and size ==
More than 50 megacryometeors have been recorded since the year 2000. They vary in mass between 0.5 kilograms (1.1 lb) to several tens of kilograms. One in Brazil weighed in at more than 50 kilograms (110 lb). Chunks about 2 m (6 ft 7 in) in size also fell in Scotland on 13 August 1849.

== Formation ==
The process that creates megacryometeors is not completely understood yet, mainly with respect to the atmospheric dynamics necessary to produce them. They may have a similar mechanism of formation that leads to the production of hailstones. Scientific studies show that their composition matches normal tropospheric rainwater for the areas in which they fall. In addition, megacryometeors also display textural variations of the ice surface and hydro-chemical and isotopic heterogeneity in its composition, which gives potential evidence to a complex formation process in the lower atmosphere. It is known that they do not form from airplane toilet leakage because the large chunks of ice that occasionally do fall from airliners are distinctly blue due to the disinfectant used by them (hence their common name of "blue ice").

Some have speculated that these ice chunks must have fallen from aircraft fuselages after plain water ice accumulating on those aircraft through normal atmospheric conditions has simply broken loose. However, similar events also occurred prior to the invention of aircraft. Studies indicate that the metrological fluctuations in tropopause, associated with hydration of the lower stratosphere and stratospheric cooling, can be related to their formation. A detailed micro-Raman spectroscopic study made it possible to place the formation of the megacryometeors within a particular range of temperatures: −10 to −20 °C (14 to −4 °F). They are sometimes confused with meteors because they can leave small impact craters, though they form in the atmosphere and not from outer space.
