= Lasqueti Island =

Island in British Columbia, Canada

Coordinates: 49°29′N 124°15′W

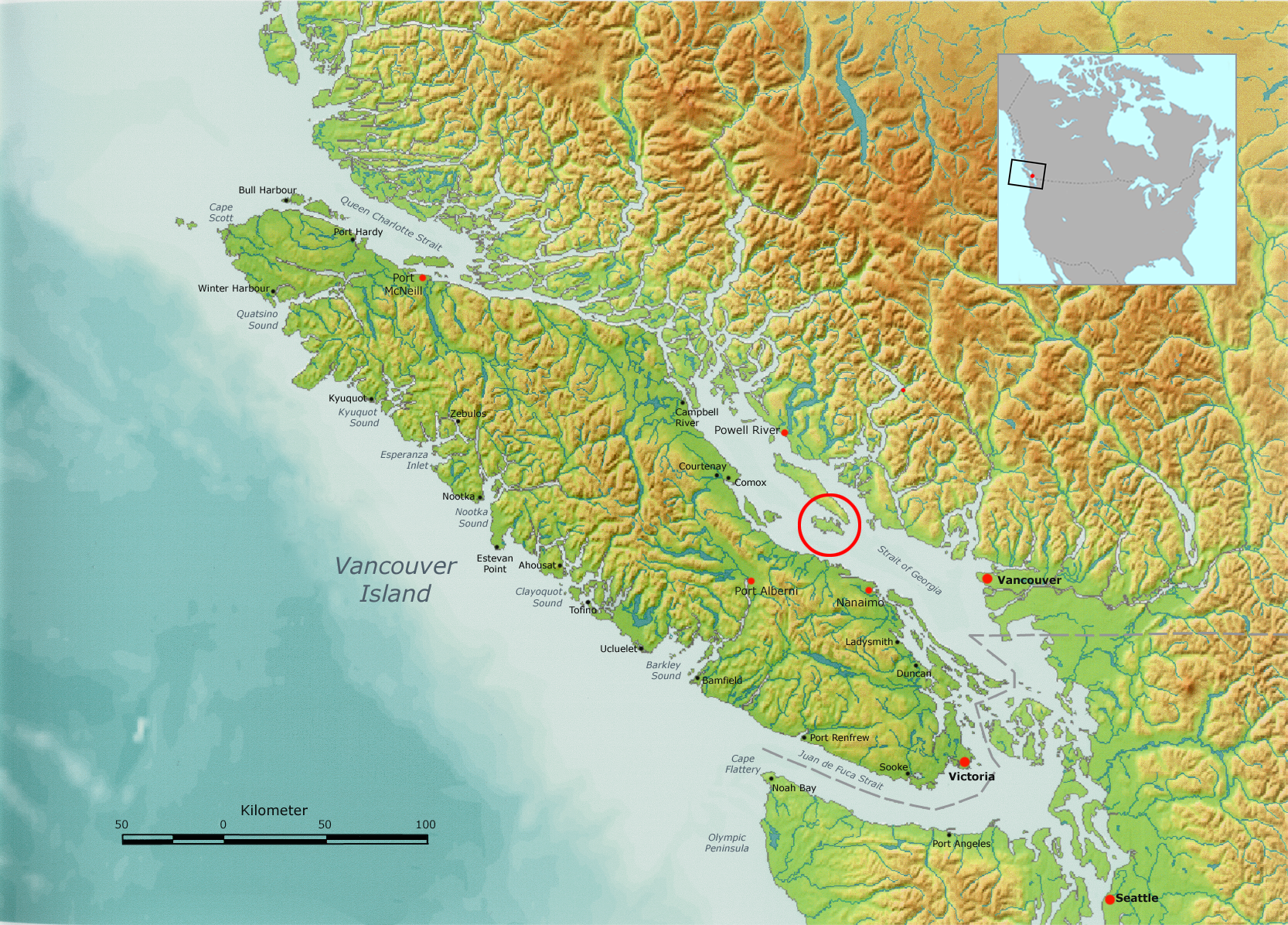
Location of Lasqueti Island

Lasqueti Island (US: /ləˈskiːti/ lə-SKEE-tee) is an island off the east coast of Vancouver Island in the Strait of Georgia within qathet Regional District in British Columbia, Canada. As of 2021, it has a population of 498. A passenger-only ferry connects the island to the community of French Creek, near Parksville. The ferry makes two to three runs per day, six days per week, weather permitting. The ferry service is run by Western Pacific Marine for BC Ferries.

== History ==
Lasqueti Island was named in 1791 by Spanish naval officer José María Narváez, commander of the Santa Saturnina (see Juan Carrasco (explorer)) after Juan Maria Lasqueti, a prominent Spanish naval officer.

== Community ==
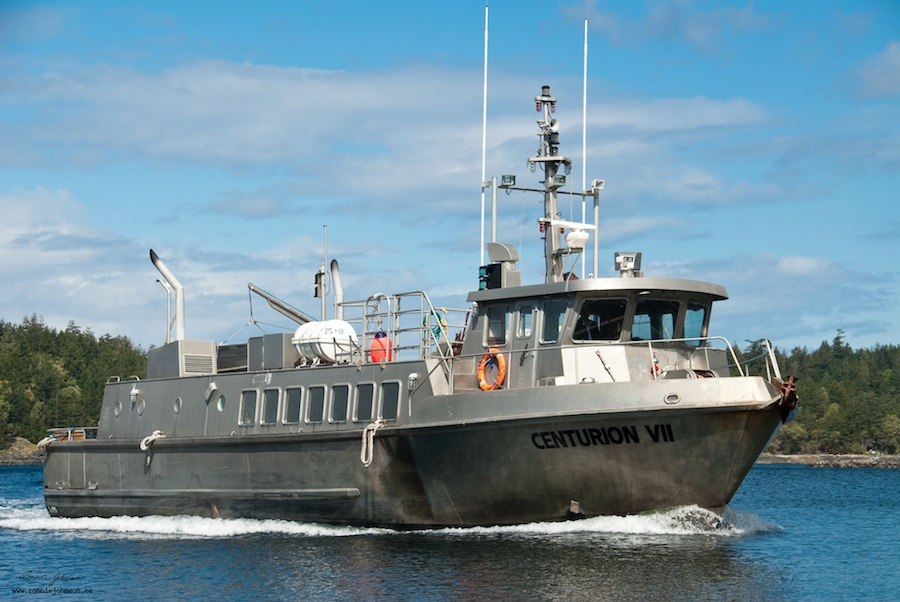
The ferry from Vancouver Island to Lasqueti Island, Centurion VII, coming into False Bay to dock.

The island community is an enclave of Canadian counter-culture. Lasqueti Island is one of the least developed of the major Gulf Islands. Its roads are mostly unpaved, and it is the only one of the larger Gulf Islands that is not currently connected to BC Hydro's electrical power grid. Solar, wind, micro-hydro, and fossil fueled generators power the island.

There is a hotel and a restaurant in False Bay, where the ferry arrives and departs. There are at least three B&B's on the island, but services are seasonal and very limited. Potable water may be scarce at times, in different places on the island. There are local markets and an informal food cooperative but they operate at odd hours, depending on the season and demand. Lasqueti Island has a yearly Arts Festival on Canada Day weekend, and other activities. These different festivals and informal activities feature local painters, sculptors, poets, fiction writers, and historians. Performing arts, on the Canada Day long-weekend, include: The Bolting Brassicas (marching band), the Lasquirkus (circus), and other activities.

The island has a reputation for sailing and sea kayaking which is considered among some of the finest, but also among the most challenging, in lower British Columbia. Tides and currents may become foreboding without warning - the winter weather down the Strait of Georgia has been responsible for various mariners' deaths.

== Police and fire services ==
The island is currently under the jurisdiction of the Oceanside RCMP detachment, based out of Parksville. The island maintains a two truck volunteer fire department.

== Demographics ==
The island had a population of 498 in the 2021 Canadian census, up 24.8% from the 2016 Canadian census. It has a land area of 73.32 km^{2} (28.3 sq mi).

== Aquaculture and agriculture ==
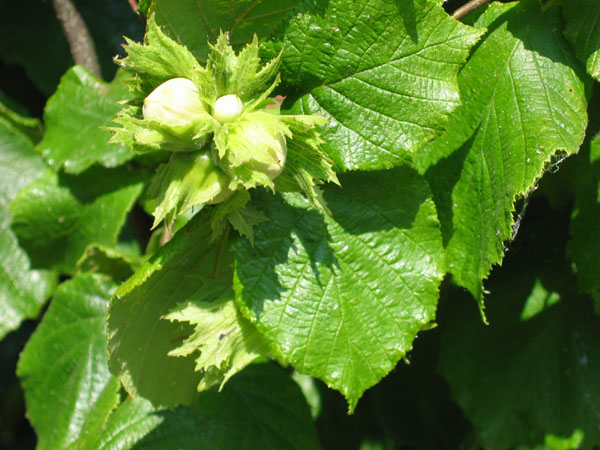
Hazelnuts growing in one of many orchards on Lasqueti Island.

Aquaculture includes clams, geoducks, oysters, honey mussels, and prawns. Agriculture include seasonal vegetables, orchards, nuts, and berries. There are a few farms on Lasqueti Island. Their products range from blueberries, apple juice, eggs, to maple syrup. There also is a shellfish farm and a shellfish hatchery.

== Flora and fauna ==
The island is generally divided between drier areas, characterized by the presence of native arbutus, cacti, and other succulent plants, and wetter areas featuring red cedar. Some old growth forest still exists on this island as well, providing habitat for a unique mix of flora and fauna. The understory of the forests on the island have seen extensive damage due to the proliferation of feral sheep.

== Geography ==
The soils on this island for the most part are shallow, stony deposits over bedrock which is almost entirely igneous and largely basaltic.

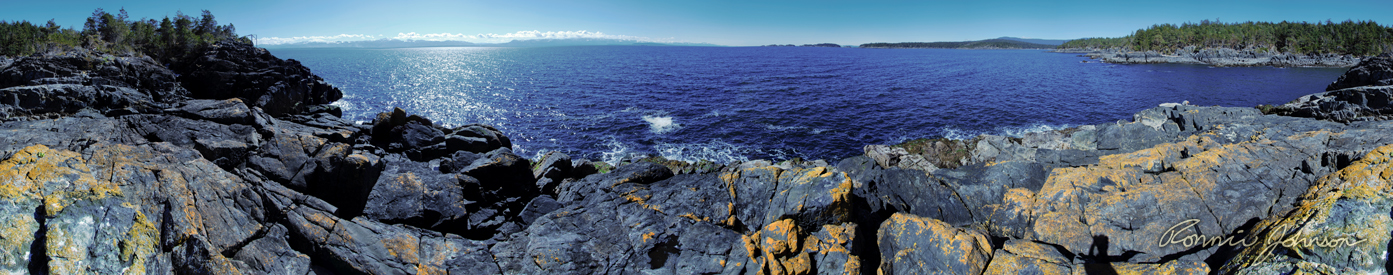
Panorama of False Bay from Heath Islet. In view on the horizon is Vancouver Island to the left and Finnerty Islands in the middle. False Bay is on the right side.

== Parks ==
Squitty Bay is Lasqueti Island’s only Provincial Park. There is also the Lasqueti Island Ecological Reserve. Camping or campfires are not allowed at any of the parks on Lasqueti Island.

Jedediah Island Marine Provincial Park and Sabine Channel Provincial Park are provincial parks that exist on nearby islands. Camping is allowed at both of these provincial parks. Jedediah Island Marine Provincial Park is the site of a heritage farm of a former settler.

== In popular culture ==
Lasqueti Island is featured in an investigative news report by Global's 16x9 called Off the Grid, which aired on April 28, 2012.

== Islands near Lasqueti Island ==
Major:

- Texada Island

Minor:

- Jedediah Island
- Finnerty Islands
- Jervis Island
- Bull Island
- Sangster Island
- Jenkins Island
- Sisters Lighthouse

== See also ==
- Rand Holmes
