= Jedediah Island Marine Provincial Park =

Provincial park in British Columbia, Canada

- IUCN category II (national park)
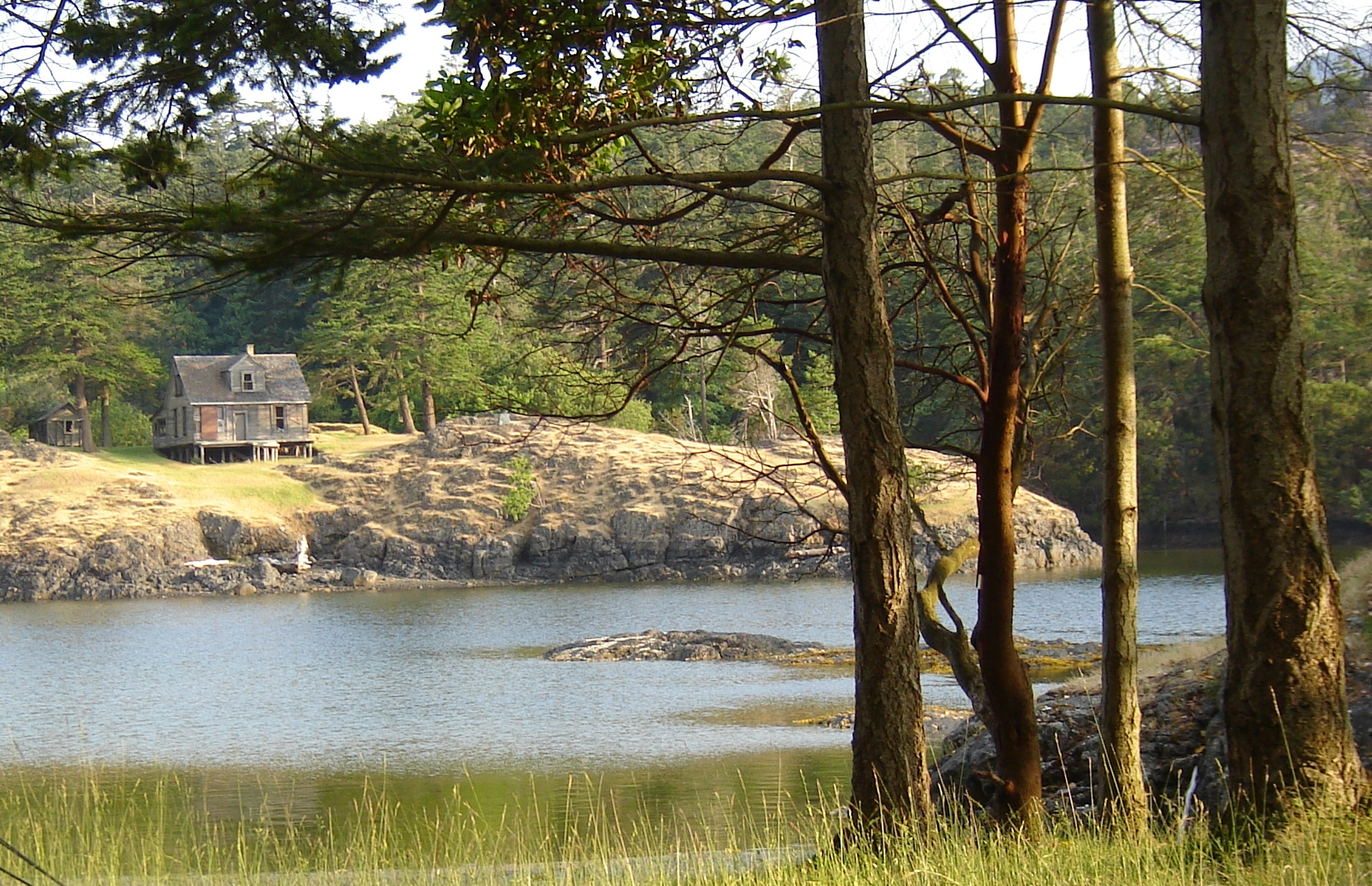
- View from campsite in Home Bay, 2008

- Location within Vancouver Island Location within British Columbia
- Interactive map of Jedediah Island Marine Provincial Park
- Location: Nanaimo Land District, British Columbia, Canada
- Nearest city: Sechelt, BC
- Coordinates: 49°30′06″N 124°12′16″W
- Area: 603 ha (1,490 acres)
- Established: July 13, 1995
- Governing body: BC Parks

Jedediah Island Marine Provincial Park is a provincial park in British Columbia, Canada. At approximately 243 hectares (600 acres) in size, Jedediah Island is one of the largest island parks in the province. Anyone is free to camp on the island; however, it is only accessible by boat. The nearest access is from Lasqueti Island.

== History ==
=== The Mattice and Palmer families ===
Evan and Mary Mattice from Seattle, Washington, bought the Island in 1949 as a vacation getaway in the summer with their two sons. For many years, the family visited from Seattle with the hopes of eventually living there full-time.

In 1972, Mary and her second husband, Albert W. Palmer, moved to the island and became full-time residents, living there for twenty years. Evan Mattice, Mary’s first husband, continued to visit often after Mary remarried, until his death in the early 1990s. Their oldest son and his family also eventually wanted to move to Jedediah Island. In 1979, he finally moved his family from Kirkland, Washington to Vancouver Island. He built a house at Long Bay on Jedediah Island, and began to clear land for horticulture farming. As soon as his children finished secondary school, the eldest son planned to also continue living on Jedediah Island with his wife. Mary Palmer decided to sell after her son built his house.

=== Conversion to a park ===
In 1994, a small group of residents on Lasqueti Island became concerned that the Palmers might have to sell the property privately after the commitment from a land trust organization fell through, so they organized a campaign to save the island. In less than six months, they raised more than four million dollars. A major donation came from the family of Dan Culver, Canadian educator, white water rafting pioneer, sailor and mountain climber, and further donations came from all over the province as the campaign progressed. Finally, the province's Minister for the Environment bought in and the target amount was surpassed. However, the deal was still uncertain until Mary Palmer got the provincial park service to agree to Class A status for the island, meaning it could not be logged or mined. With that commitment in place, she signed the island over to become a new Gulf Islands provincial park.

=== Human foot discovery ===
In the summer of 2007, a family visiting Jedediah Island found the remains of a human foot on the beach. It was the first in a series of feet to be discovered in the following years throughout the Salish Sea. The foot that washed up on Jedediah Island was traced back to a man that has been missing since 2004 – foul play is not suspected.

== Gallery ==
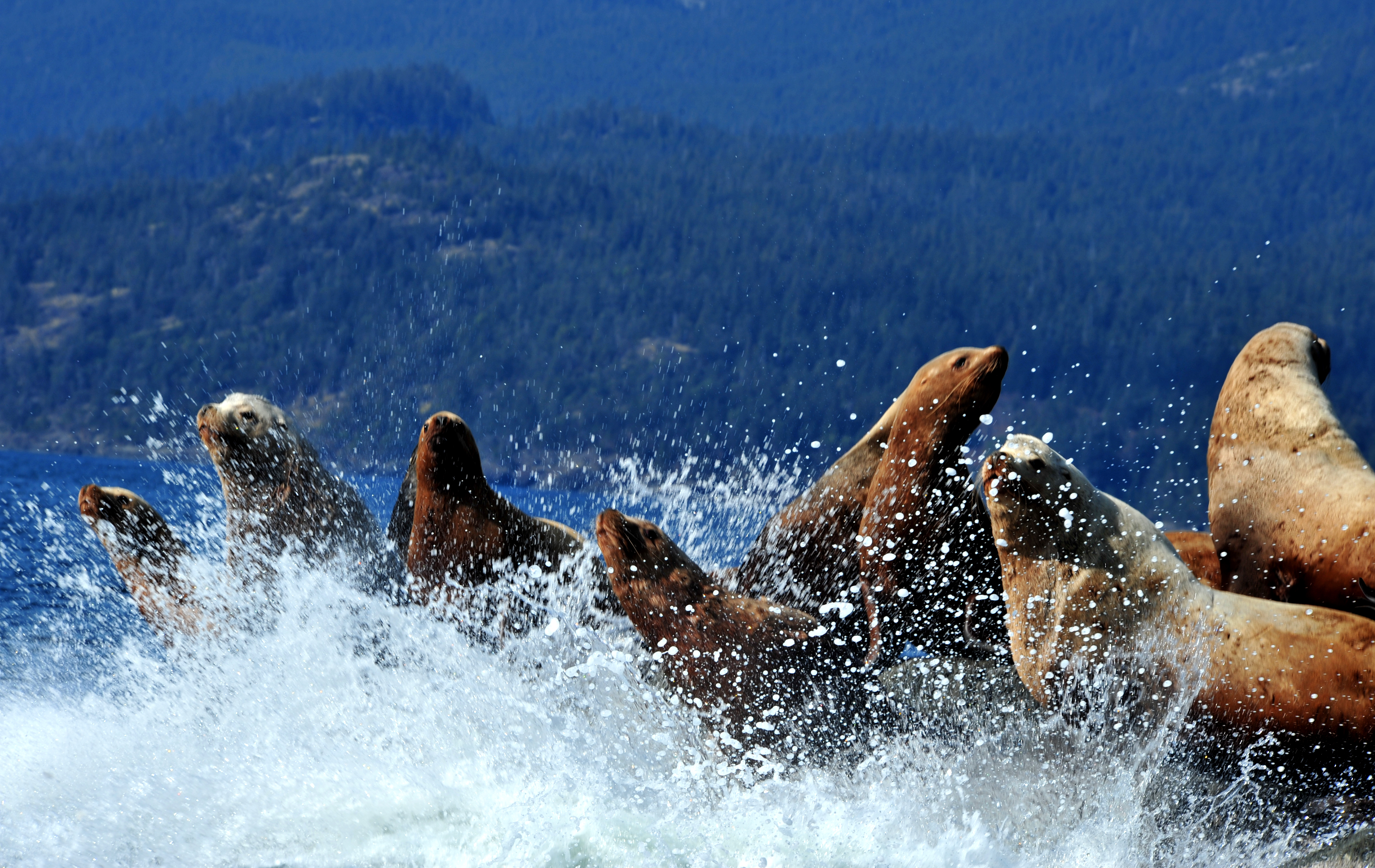
Steller sea lions crowd onto a rock at Jedediah Island Marine Provincial Park
