= Glacial erratic boulders of Island County, Washington =

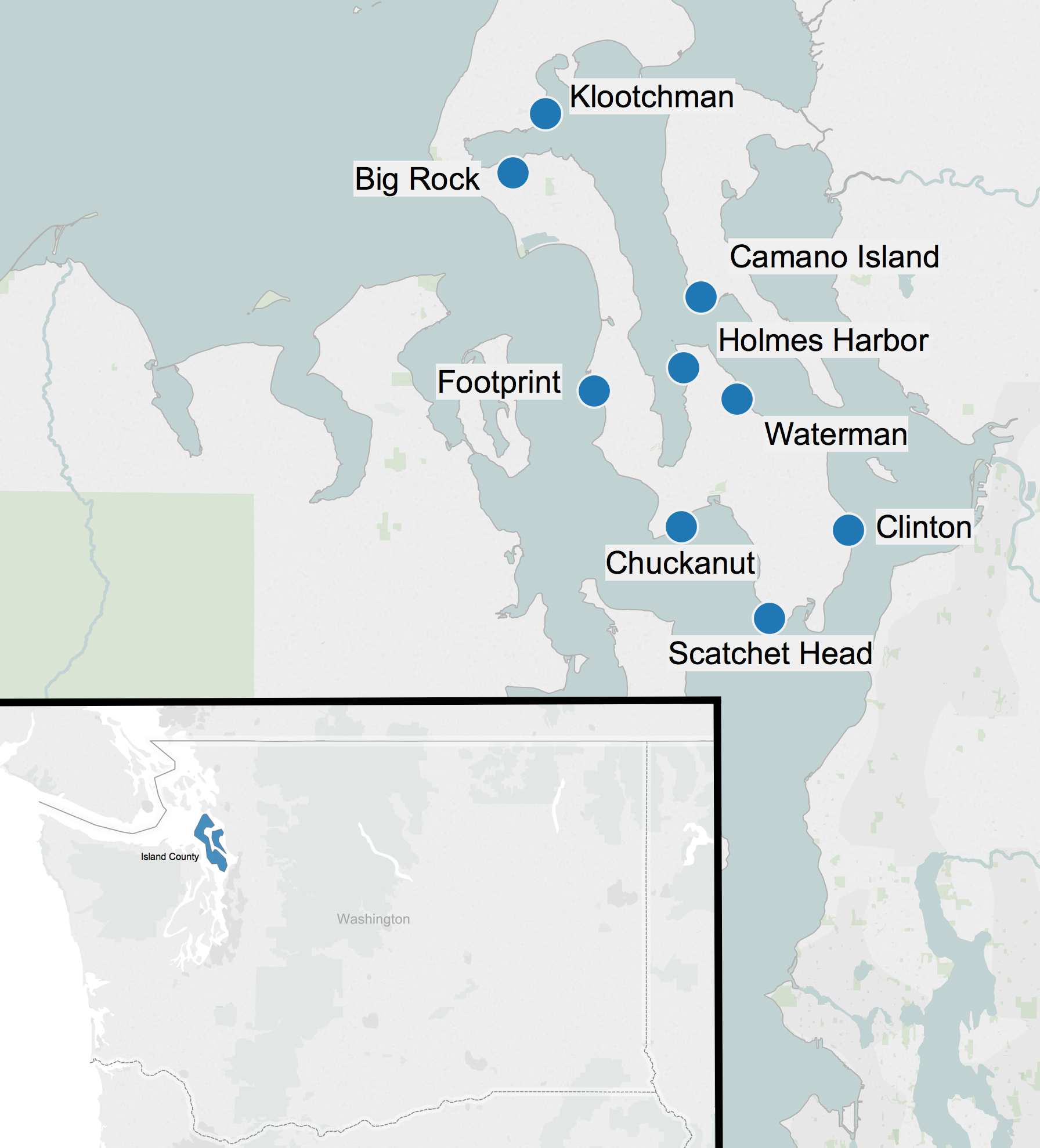
Locations of glacial erratics in Island County.

Glacial erratic boulders in Island County are a remnant of the Pleistocene glaciation that created Puget Sound and transformed the surfaces of what are now Island County's main landmasses: Whidbey Island and Camano Island. South of Deception Pass, the two islands' surfaces and beaches are completely composed of glacial till. Abundant glacial erratic boulders lie on the islands, their beaches, and under the near-shore waters.

== List of boulders ==
Big Rock, once known as the Rock of Ages, is a 30-foot (9.1 m) high greenstone erratic and a landmark on Main Street in Coupeville, at one time considered for a city conservation easement. 48°12′38″N 122°41′14″W
Camano Island State Park erratic is on the south cliff trail in Camano Island State Park, overlooking Saratoga Passage. 48°07′43″N 122°29′59″W
Chuckanut erratic is a 10-foot (3.0 m) tall Chuckanut Formation sandstone boulder on the beach below Double Bluff. 47°58′30″N 122°31′07″W
The Clinton erratic is a greenstone boulder with north-south glacial striations, at the corner of Conrad St and Berg Road above the ferry terminal in the town of Clinton. The rock and Coupeville's Big Rock were used to calibrate ^{36}Cl radiometric dating due to the well established date they were deposited and began to receive cosmic ray bombardment. 47°58′23.7″N 122°21′9.36″W
Footprint Rock is a boulder near Smugglers Cove on Whidbey Island's west side. The rock, high in the intertidal zone, gets its name from a "footprint like impression". 48°3′57.96″N 122°36′19.8″W
The Holmes Harbor erratic is on the eastern shore of Holmes Harbor, and is somewhat taller than a man. 48°04′52″N 122°31′01″W
Klootchman Rock (also spelled Kloochman) is metamorphic rock boulder with white veins. The 35-foot (11 m) tall boulder topped with grass, and its broken shards sit at the base of Blowers Bluff between Penn Cove and Oak Harbor. The rock has a National Geodetic Survey control station at its highest point. There is a submerged feature (bar) also called Klootchman Rock about 100 meters offshore. 48°15′00″N 122°39′14″W
Scatchet Head erratics are on the beach below bluffs at the southwest point of Whidbey Island. 47°54′51.48″N 122°25′52.32″W
Waterman Rock is a house-sized greenschist erratic with a circumference of 155 feet (47 m) and height of 38 feet (12 m) to 40 feet (12 m) or greater in Saratoga Woods Preserve near Langley. It may be the second largest erratic in Washington State, after the Lake Stevens Monster. The property including the rock was acquired in 2002 or 2005 for conservation. 48°03′38″N 122°27′47″W

== See also ==
- List of individual rocks

== Sources ==
- Mimi Sheridan, "Brief history of central Whidbey Island–natural history" (PDF), Ebey's Landing National Historic Reserve: Self-guided walking tour of historic Coupeville (brochure), U.S. National Park Service, archived from the original (PDF) on 2015-08-12
- Haugerud, Ralph (2008), Nearshore surveys with LIDAR (PDF), United States Geological Survey – via Washington Department of Ecology
- Tucker, Dave (February 11, 2010), "Whidbey Island erratics", Northwest Geology Field Trips
- Tucker, Dave (July 2010), "Whidbey Island glacial deposits", Northwest Geology Field Trips
- "Whidbey Island: Glacial erratics", Western Geo Hikes, January 29, 2008, archived from the original on 2015-06-10
- Whidbey Island Glaciation (ESS 210) (PDF) (Field trip handbook), University of Washington Department of Earth and Space Sciences
- Swanson, Terry W. (2009), Late Pleistocene Glacial History of Whidbey Island, WA (PDF) (Field trip handbook), University of Washington Department of Earth and Space Sciences
