= Glacial erratic boulders of Kitsap County, Washington =

Boulders in Kitsap County, Washington

Glacial erratic boulders of Kitsap County are large glacial erratic boulders of rock which were moved into Kitsap County, Washington by glacial action during previous ice ages.

Kitsap County was so extensively formed by glaciation that according to J Harlen Bretz almost any east-west traverse across the Kitsap Peninsula (shared with two other counties) will describe an ascending and descending profile across till ridges.

== List of boulders ==
Frog Rock, dynamited, moved off the road, and stacked in 20th century 47.69612°N 122.52347°W
Haleets, at Agate Point on Bainbridge Island, has petroglyphs said to be from before 400 CE 47°43′07.1″N 122°32′40.1″W
Illahee Preserve erratic At Illahee Preserve Almira parking lot 47.6141°N 122.6225°W
Illahee Road erratic, an "extremely large erratic of volcanic rock" 47.60066°N 122.60268°W
Lone Rock, the namesake landmark of the unincorporated community of Lone Rock, located on the Hood Canal tidal flat about 400 feet off shore. At least 50 feet (15 m) across. 47.66297°N 122.769916°W

== See also ==
- List of individual rocks
