= Naha Stone =

Hawaiian ceremonial stone

Coordinates: 19°43′28″N 155°05′26″W

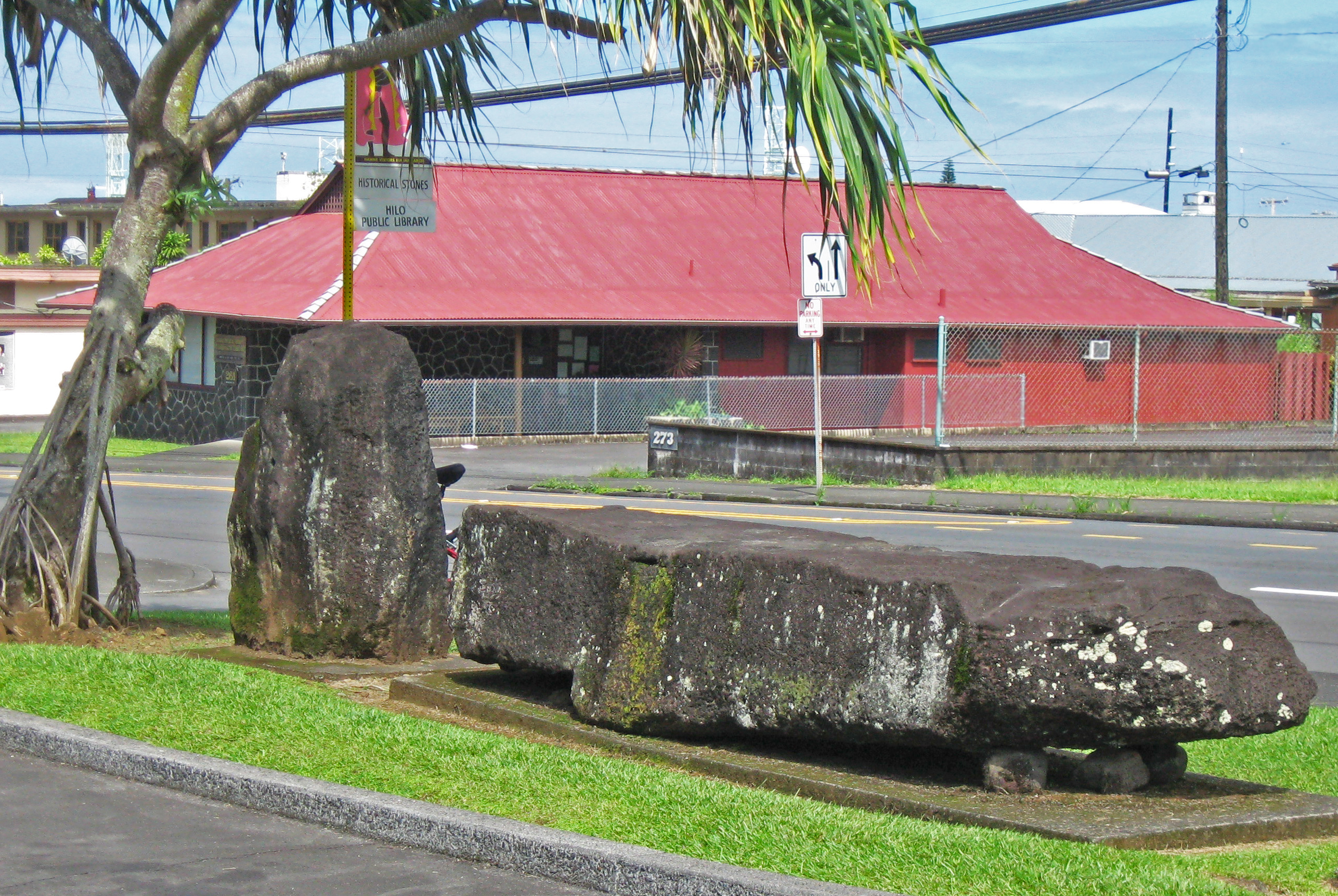
The Naha Stone in Hilo, Hawaii.

The Naha Stone is a large volcanic rock located in Hilo, Hawaii. The stone was used in the cultural traditions of Native Hawaiians, and many legends surround it. It is estimated to weigh between 2.5 and 3.5 tons.

== Origin ==
The Naha Stone originated from Mount Waialeale on the Hawaiian island of Kauai. It was found on the banks of the Wailua River before being moved via a double canoe to Hilo, where it became a symbol of the Naha rank of Hawaiian royalty.

The stone was used to prove the legitimacy of the bloodline of any claiming to be of the Naha rank. When a child was born, they were placed on top of the slab of rock. If they remained silent, they were considered to be one of the members of the Naha rank. If they cried out, they would be cast out. The Naha Stone was considered sacred, and only members of the Naha rank were permitted to move it.

A legend existed that if one were to overturn the stone, that man would be granted the power to unify all of Hawaii. King Kamehameha, the eventual conqueror of the Hawaiian Islands, was said to have been influenced by this legend. Some sources state that he was able to move the stone at the age of 14, after a series of failed attempts.

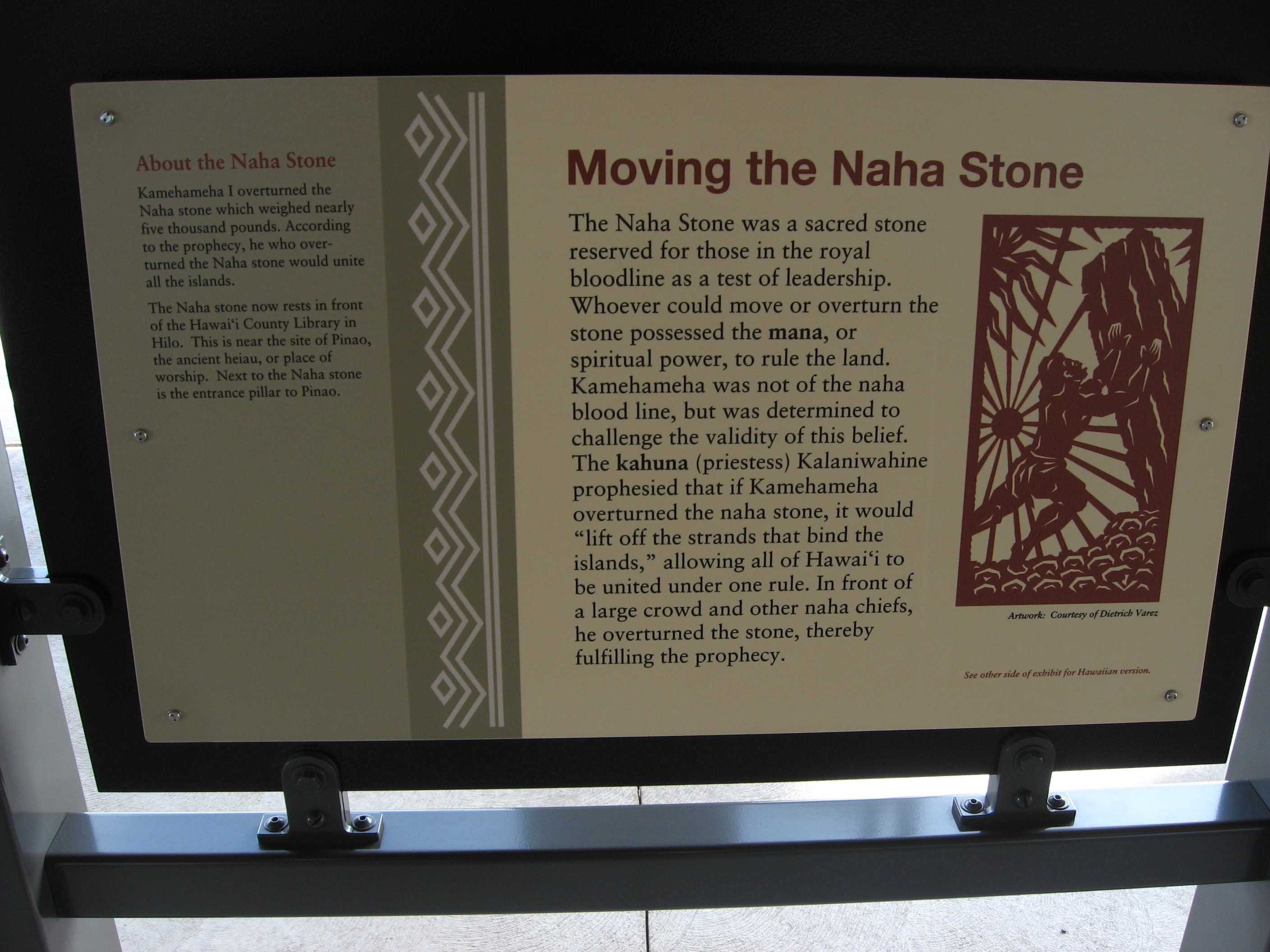
Informative sign detailing the moving of the Naha Stone.

The stone was relocated to the front of the Hilo Public Library in 1952, where it remains today.

== See also ==
- List of individual rocks

== Bibliography ==
- Desha, Stephen; Frazier, Frances N. (2000). Kamehameha and His Warrior Kekūhaupiʻo. Kamehameha Schools Press. ISBN 978-0873360562. OCLC 44114603.
