= Howard's Rock =

Piece of quartzite

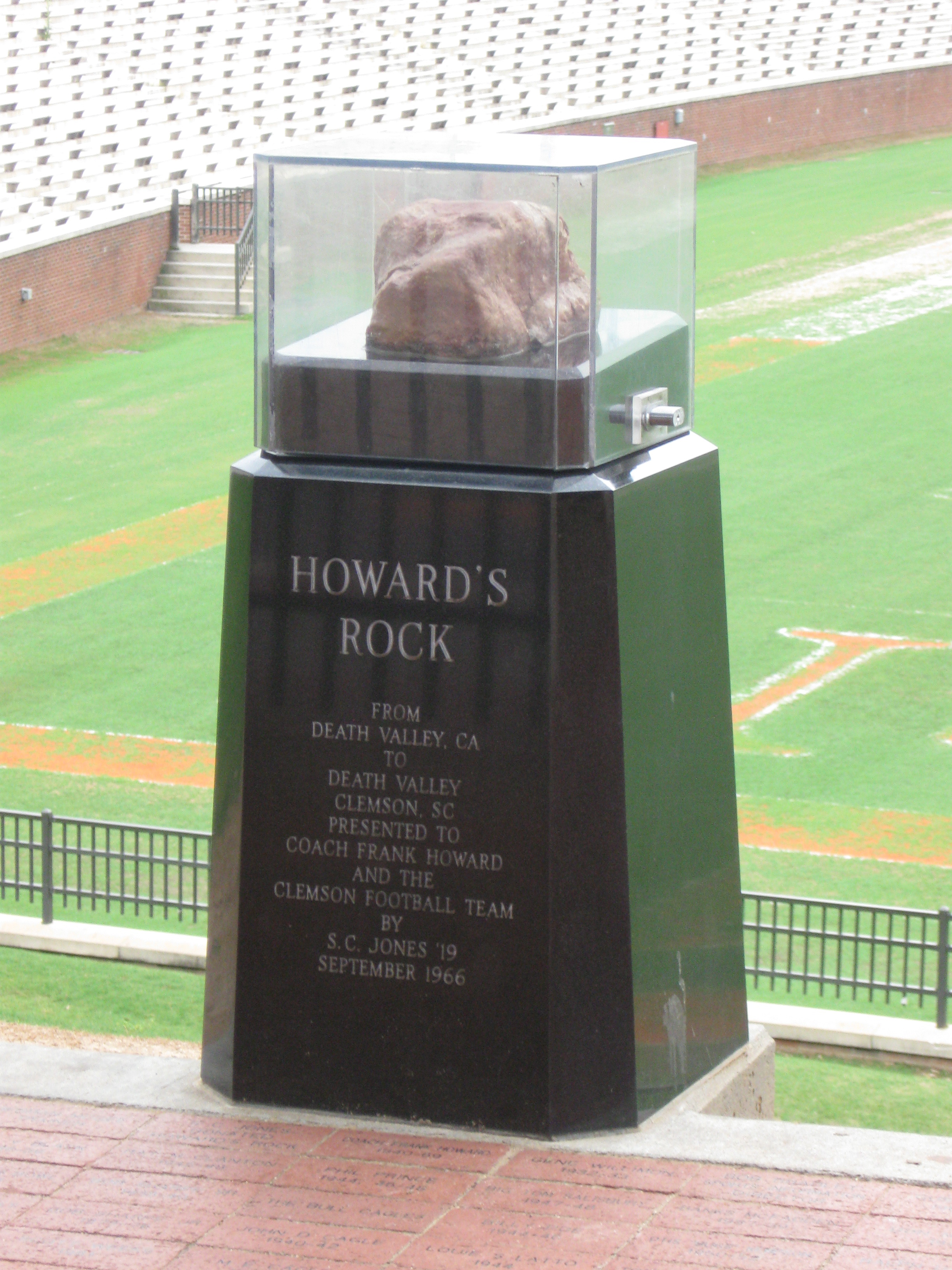

Howard's Rock is a large piece of quartzite that is displayed in Clemson University's Memorial Stadium. The rock is the center of a longstanding tradition where players touch it before running down the hill in the east end zone at each home football game.

== History ==
The rock was brought to football coach Frank Howard in the early 1960s as a gift from Samuel C. Jones. Jones found the rock while driving through Death Valley, California and gave it to Howard as a reference to "Death Valley," the name used to refer to Memorial Stadium. The coach used the rock as a doorstop until 1966. He was cleaning out his office when he told Gene Willimon, a Clemson booster, "Take this rock and throw it over the fence or out in the ditch...Do something with it, but get it out of my office." It was Willimon who had the rock placed on a pedestal in the east end zone, where it remains today.

The rock made its first appearance on September 24, 1966: Clemson was losing to Virginia by 18 points with seventeen minutes left in the game. The Tigers made up the deficit and won the game 40-35. The next season was when the tradition of rubbing the rock upon entering the stadium began. Howard reportedly said to his players, "If you're going to give me 110 percent, you can rub that rock. If you're not, keep your filthy hands off of it."

The Tigers have continued this tradition since 1967, except for two-and-a-half seasons between 1970 and 1972. This was due to new head coach Hootie Ingram's changing the team's entrance to the west end zone after Frank Howard's retirement. During those seasons, Clemson held a bad record at home of 6-9. Before the South Carolina rivalry game in 1972, the team voted to enter via the east end zone and run down the hill. They later won the game 7-6.

== Vandalism ==
There have been many attempts of vandalism to Howard's Rock over the decades. On June 2, 2013, Howard's Rock was vandalized. The case the rock was held in was broken into and a large portion of the rock was broken off. One man was arrested in the initial investigation; ESPN reported that “the charges being pressed on him are felony malicious injury to animals or personal property valued at more than $2,000 but less than $10,000 and misdemeanor trespassing." The charges were subsequently upgraded. The damage to the rock was evaluated to be more than $10,000. Clemson University police later stated that the surveillance video from the outside of Memorial Stadium shows that three people got out of the truck used in the act. Two more people were subsequently arrested, before being released on a bond of $7,500.

One person was found guilty of malicious damage, but the jury found him not guilty of grand larceny. The judge gave him the maximum sentence of 30 days in jail or a $1,000 fine for the malicious damage charge; however, the sentence was suspended, meaning he did not have to serve the jail time, so long as he paid a $750 fine and completed 25 days of supervised community service.

Two other men arrested later pleaded guilty to the misdemeanor of giving false information to police, to cover up the vandalism.

== See also ==
- List of individual rocks
