= List of individual rocks =

Named rocks (not types of rock)

The following is a list of notable rocks and stones.

Image	Name	Location	Notes
	Agglestone Rock	Dorset, United Kingdom	Large sandstone rock said to have been thrown by the Devil
	Al Naslaa	Nafud desert, Saudi Arabia	Large sandstone rock vertically split neatly into two parts, each balanced on a small pedestal.
	Amersfoortse Kei	Amersfoort, Utrecht, Netherlands	Boulder brought to the city by Lord Everard Meyster on June 7, 1671, buried in 1672 and dug up in 1903. The city owes its nickname "Keistad (Cobblestone City)" to this history.
	Arbitration Rock	New York City, New York, United States	The boundary marker between the two Long Island townships of Newtown and Bushwick.
Monolito de la Piedra del Sol	Aztec sun stone	Mexico City, Mexico	Recovered from Aztec ruins under Mexico City.
	Balance Rock	Bar Harbor, Maine, U.S.	Deposited during an ice age.
	Barstyčiai stone	Barstyčiai, Lithuania	Largest boulder in Lithuania.
	Battle of Ethandun memorial	near Bratton Castle, Wiltshire, South West England	A memorial to the Battle of Edington.
	Batu Batikam	Tanah Datar Regency, Indonesia	A sacred stone with a hole in it.
	Bethan's Rock	Poole, Dorset,United Kingdom	A small grey-and-white stone donated to Poole Museum in 2019 by a five-year-old girl named Bethan.
	Big Bertha	Lunar Sample Laboratory Facility, Houston, Texas, United States	Breccia Moon rock which may contain an Earth-origin meteorite. Collected by Apollo 14 astronauts, the meteorite would be the oldest known rock originating from Earth, being approximately 4 billion years old.
	Big Muley	Lunar Sample Laboratory Facility, Houston, Texas, United States	Anorthosite Moon rock collected by Apollo 16 astronauts. It is approximately 3.9 billion years old and is the largest Moon rock brought from the Moon.
	Black Rock	Tooele County, Utah, United States	Large rock on the shoreline of Great Salt Lake.
	Black Stone	Kaaba, Great Mosque, Mecca, Saudi Arabia	A highly respected Islamic stone set in the Kaaba's corner.
	Blarney Stone	Blarney Castle, Blarney, Ireland	A stone that is part of the battlement of Blarney Castle. According to legend, kissing the stone endows the kisser with great eloquence/flattery.
	Blowing Stone	Kingston Lisle, Oxfordshire, England	A sarsen.
	Boston Stone	Boston, Massachusetts, United States	A round stone embedded in the wall of a building.
	Bowder Stone	Borrowdale, Cumbria, England	Large andesite boulder; historic tourist attraction.
	Braddock's Rock	Washington, D.C., United States	The supposed landing spot of General Edward Braddock in 1755 during the French and Indian War. Located at the bottom of a well.
	Brutus Stone	Totnes, Devon, England	Granite boulder and supposed stone onto which the mythical founder of Britain first stood.
	Bubble Rock	Acadia National Park, Maine, United States	A glacial erratic on South Bubble mountain.
	Camel Rock	Tesuque, New Mexico, United States	Natural landmark composed of pink sandstone measuring approximately 40 feet high (~12m) and 100 feet long (~30.5m).
	Carreg y Bwci	Llanycrwys, Wales	
	Carreg y Fendith	St Dogmaels, Wales	Supposed stone from which the Abbot of St Dogamaels Abbey blessed the fishing fleet. A significant echo is present.
	Cloch Labhrais	County Waterford, Ireland	Large split glacial boulder subject of a legend similar to that of the Blarney Stone. According to legend, the stone can reveal whether someone is lying.
	Cloughmore	Rostrevor, County Down, Northern Ireland	Granite boulder; tourist attraction.
	Cochegan Rock	Montville, Connecticut	Largest boulder in the US state of Connecticut and of cultural significance to the Mohegan people.
	Colossus of Ostermunzel	Ostermunzel, Lower Saxony, Germany	Gneiss glacial erratic stone transported 1km after discovery.
	Commandment Rock	Lane Cove National Park, Sydney, New South Wales, Australia	Large rock with the Fifth Commandment and Aboriginal symbols carved into it.
	Coronation Stone	Kingston upon Thames, England	Coronation stone of several Anglo-Saxon kings.
	Culbone Stone	Somerset, England	Sandstone standing stone.
	Damestenen	near Svendborg, Denmark	Largest glacial erratic in Denmark.
	Daggett Rock	Phillips, Maine	Largest boulder in the US state of Maine.
	Devil's Rock, Budča	Budča, Slovakia	17 ton stone that is naturally placed on its 2cm base.
	The Diamond Stone More commonly known as the Swindon Stone.	near Avebury, Wiltshire, South West England	A large sarsen megalith.
	Diederichs's stone	Qingdao, China	Stone site of a former German monument originally dedicated in 1898.
	Dighton Rock	Berkley, Massachusetts, United States	Boulder with petroglyphs of unknown origin.
	Doane Rock	Eastham, Massachusetts, United States	Glacial erratic boulder named after John Doane.
	Dog Rock	Albany, Western Australia	Large, natural granite outcrop shaped like a dog's head.
	Foundation Stone	Jerusalem, Israel	Sacred stone located in the Dome of the Rock.
	Frog Rock	Bainbridge Island, Washington, United States	Glacial erratic landmark composed of two boulders painted to look like a frog in 1971.
	Frog Rock	Eastford, Connecticut, United States	Glacial erratic landmark composed of a single boulder painted to look like a frog in 1881.
	Genesis Rock	Lunar Sample Laboratory Facility, Houston, Texas, United States	Anorthosite Moon rock collected by Apollo 15 astronauts.
	Giant's Boot	Giant's Causeway, County Antrim, Northern Ireland	
	Giant Rock	near Landers, California, United States	Freestanding boulder in the Mojave Desert.
	Giebichenstein boulder	Stöckse, Lower Saxony, Germany	One of the largest erratic boulders in northern Germany
	Glen Rock	Glen Rock, New Jersey, United States	Gneiss glacial erratic and town namesake.
	Glover's Rock	Pelham Bay Park, The Bronx, New York City, New York, United States	Granite boulder with a bronze plaque commemorating the Battle of Pell's Point. Supposed spot where John Glover stood during the battle.
	Gotobiki-iwa	Kamikura Shrine, Shingū, Wakayama Prefecture, Japan	Sacred granite rock
	Great Scott	Lunar Sample Laboratory Facility, Houston, Texas, United States	Basalt Moon rock collected by Apollo 15 astronauts.
	Great Stone of Fourstones	Forest of Bowland, England	Glacial deposit carved with steps and used as a boundary marker along the Lancashire–Yorkshire county border.
	Green Mountain Giant	Whitingham, Vermont, United States	Glacial erratic from the Green Mountains.
	Gros Caillou	Lyon, France	Literally Big Rock or Big Pebble. Glacial erratic on a hill in the center of Lyon.
	Haleets	Bainbridge Island, Washington, United States	Sandstone boulder inscribed with petroglyphs and survey mark.
	Hamza Stone	Giresun Island, Turkey	Boulder with ancient religious significance.
	Hattusa Green Stone	Located on a hill above Boğazkale, in the Turkish Province of Çorum	Large cubic stone believed to be nephrite; purpose unknown
	Haystack Rock	Cannon Beach, Oregon, United States	235-foot monolith accessible by foot at low tide.
	Heel Stone	Stonehenge, Wiltshire, England	Sarsen stone 80m from the center of Stonehenge
	Henderson Stone	Glencoe, Highland, Scotland	Granite boulder associated with the Massacre of Glencoe.
	The Hitching Stone	North Yorkshire, England	Sandstone block that lies at the borders of historic counties.
	Hippo's Yawn	Western Australia	Rock resembling a yawning hippopotamus.
	Hollywood Stone	Hollywood, County Wicklow, Ireland	Granite boulder with a labyrinth pattern carved into it, discovered in 1908.
	Howard's Rock	Clemson Memorial Stadium, Clemson, South Carolina, United States	A rock that forms part of a tradition in American football games in the stadium.
	Húsafell Stone	Húsafell, Iceland	Legendary stone used as a test of physical strength.
	Indian God Rock	Rockland Township, Venango County, Pennsylvania, United States	Sandstone boulder with petroglyphs.
	Initial Rock	Billings County, North Dakota, United States	Rock with the names of General Custer's men carved into in 1876.
	Inscription Rock	Kelleys Island, Ohio, United States	Limestone rock carved with native petroglyphs.
	Jefferson Rock	Harpers Ferry, West Virginia, United States	Shale rock where Thomas Jefferson stood in 1783.
	Judaculla Rock	Cullowhee, North Carolina, United States	Soapstone rock with petroglyphs of significance for the Cherokee.
	Jupiter Stone (Iuppiter Lapis)	Temple of Jupiter, Capitoline Hill, Rome, Italy	Stone upon which oaths were sworn in ancient Rome. It is not reliably known to have actually existed as such, and if it did its present state and location are not known.
	Kensington Runestone	Kensington, Minnesota, United States	Greywacke stone covered in runes purported as a record left behind by Scandinavian explorers in the 14th century. It was later classified as a hoax.
	Khuwalung	Saptakoshi River, Koshi Province, Nepal	Rock in a river sacred to the Kirati people.
	Kjeragbolten	Kjerag, Sandnes Municipality, Rogaland, Norway	A glacial till sitting in a crevasse.
	Kummakivi	Ruokolahti, Finland	A large balancing rock (glacial erratic).
	Lake Lawrence erratic	Thurston County, Washington, United States	Glacial erratic boulder near Lake Lawrence.
	Levitated Mass	Los Angeles, California, United States	Artwork.
	Lia Fáil	Hill of Tara, County Meath, Ireland	Coronation stone for the High Kings of Ireland.
	Little Rock	Little Rock, Arkansas, United States	Arkansas River landmark and survey marker that became the eponym of Little Rock.
	Logan Rock	St Levan, Cornwall, England	Granite rocking stone moved and returned in 1824.
	London Stone	111 Cannon Street, City of London, England	Historic limestone landmark.
	The Longstones	near Beckhampton, Wiltshire, South West England	Standing stones named Adam and Eve.
	Lunar basalt 70017	Lunar Sample Laboratory Facility, Houston, Texas, United States	Basalt Moon rock collected by Apollo 17 astronauts and partially divided into goodwill display samples.
	Madison Boulder	Madison, New Hampshire, United States	Large granite glacial erratic and National Natural Landmark.
	Maen Huail	Ruthin, Denbighshire, Wales	Supposed stone upon which King Arthur beheaded Hueil mab Caw.
	Malia altar stone	Malia, Crete, Greece	Minoan altar stone with hieroglyphs.
	Maqam Ibrahim	Great Mosque, Mecca, Saudi Arabia	A sacred stone associated with the building of the Kaaba.
	Maqam Ibrahim Salihin	Aleppo, Syria	A sacred stone associated with Abraham.
	Map Rock	Owyhee County, Idaho, United States	Large basalt rock with petroglyph map of Snake River.
	Memorial Rock	Montezuma County, Colorado, United States	Largest boulder along State Highway 145; designated a landmark in 2019.
	Naha Stone	Hilo, Hawaii	Mythic Hawaiian rock
	Natural Chimneys AKA The Cyclopean Towers	Augusta County, Virginia	Micrite tower-formations up to 120 feet high in an eponymous regional park in Virginia's Shenandoah Valley
	Nietzsche Stein	Lake Silvaplana, Grisons, Switzerland	Pyramidal stone nearby to which Friedrich Nietzsche conceived of the main idea in Thus Spoke Zarathustra
	Pierres du Niton	Lake Geneva, Switzerland	Boulders in Lake Geneva and reference point of altimetry in Switzerland
	Octopus stone	Osaka Castle, Osaka, Japan	Megalith at Osaka Castle near Sakura Gate with a feature resembling an octopus.
	Okotoks Erratic	Foothills County, Alberta, Canada	Also known as Big Rock, a large split boulder on the Canadian Prairies.
	Omak Rock	Colville Indian Reservation, Washington, United States	Balancing rock near Omak Lake.
	El Peñón de Guatapé	Antioquia, Colombia	Landmark inselberg with a 708 steps built staircase.
	Piedra Movediza	Tandil, Buenos Aires Province, Argentina	Balancing rock on the edge of La Movediza hill.
	Piedra Santa	Araucanía Region, Chile	Rock outcrop significant to folk Catholicism.
	Pietra Alta	Piedmont, Italy	Prominent glacial erratic left by the Riss glaciation.
	Plymouth Rock	Plymouth, Massachusetts, United States	Supposed landing site of the Pilgrims in 1620.
	Potato Chip Rock	Ramona, California, California, United States	Thin rock resembling a potato chip near San Diego, California. Popular hiking destination.
	Princess of Hope	Lasbela, Balochistan, Pakistan	A natural rock formation that looks like a human figure
	The Rock	Northwestern University, Evanston, Illinois, United States	Quartzite rock placed on campus in 1902; landmark painted various colors and with various messages.
	Rock Corral	Barlow Road, Oregon, United States	Glacial erratic and landmark on the Oregon Trail.
	Rock of Tondi	Tallinn, Estonia	Glacial erratic. A pilgrimage site for Tondians.
	Rollstone Boulder	Fitchburg, Massachusetts, United States	Granite boulder relocated in 1929.
	Rooster Rock	Multnomah County, Oregon, United States	Basalt column forming a natural obelisk in Rooster Rock State Park.
	Rosetta Stone	British Museum, London, England	Granodiorite stele created in 196 BC and rediscovered in 1799.
	Rosetta Stone (replica)	King's Library, British Museum, London, England	Replica of the stone as it was originally displayed, touchable.
	Rosetta Stone (replica)	Champollion Museum, Vif, Isère, France	Replica of the stone in an optical theater.
	Sacred Rock	Presque Isle County, Michigan, United States	Boulder on the shore of Lake Huron.
	Seatbelt Basalt	Lunar Sample Laboratory Facility, Houston, Texas, United States	Basalt Moon rock collected by Apollo 15 astronauts.
	Sentinel Rock	Sentinel Rock State Park, Vermont	A huge glacial boulder overlooking the valley around it.
	Sessho-seki	Nasu, Tochigi Prefecture, Japan	According to legend, it is said to kill anyone who comes into contact with it. Split in 2022.
	Shabaka Stone	British Museum, London, England	Ancient Egyptian relic with hieroglyphs later used as a millstone.
	Shelter Rock	Greentree, North Hills, New York, United States	Glacial erratic used as a shelter by Native Americans.
	Shorakapok Rock	Inwood Hill Park, New York City, New York, United States	Site where Manhattan Island was "sold" in 1626.
	Shuggling Stone	Glen village, Dunfanaghy, Ireland	Wobbly granite boulder.
	Silchester Ogham stone	Reading Museum, Reading, Berkshire, England	Pillar stone with an ogham inscription discovered in 1893.
	Šomoška rock waterfall	Banská Bystrica Region, Slovakia	Natural feature formed around 4 million years ago.
	Skystone	Bonney Lake, Washington, United States	Andesite boulder rediscovered in 1999.
	Solovetsky Stone	Arkhangelsk, Russia	Monument to victims of Soviet political repression. Boulder from the Solovetsky Islands.
	Solovetsky Stone	Lubyanka Square, Moscow, Russia	Monument to victims of Soviet political repression erected in 1990. Boulder brought from the Solovetsky Islands.
	Solovetsky Stone	Troitskaya Square, Saint Petersburg, Russia	Monument to victims of Soviet political repression erected in 2002. Boulder brought from the Solovetsky Islands.
	Split Rock	Pelham Bay Park, The Bronx, New York City, New York, United States	Granite boulder. Location near where Anne Hutchinson and her family settled and were later massacred.
	Standing Rock	Standing Rock, Alabama, United States	Sandstone boulder that gave the town its name.
	Standing Rock/Íŋyaŋ Wosláta	Fort Yates, North Dakota, United States	Stone sacred to the Sioux.
	Stone of Scone	Perth Museum, Perth, Scotland	Sandstone block used as a coronation stone by the monarchs of Scotland, England, Great Britain and the United Kingdom.
	Stone of Scone (replica)	Scone Palace, Scone, Perthshire, Scotland	Replica of the Stone next to a 17th-century chapel.
	Stone of Scone (replica)	Casa Loma, Toronto, Ontario, Canada	Replica of the Stone and Coronation Chair kept in a house museum.
	Stone of the Guanches	Afur, Tenerife, Canary Islands, Spain	Engraved tuff stone stele related to the process of Guanche mummification.
	Stone of Tmutarakan	Hermitage Museum, Saint Petersburg, Russia	Marble stone with an 11th-century inscription discovered in 1792.
	Sunday Rock	South Colton New York, United States	Glacial erratic moved in 1925 and 1965.
	Thurgartstone	East Ayrshire, Scotland	Glacial erratic with religious significance.
	Tirslund Rock	near Brørup, Denmark	Granite boulder that legend connects to Harald Bluetooth.
	Toad Rock	Aquinnah, Massachusetts, United States	Glacial erratic resembling a toad. According to the tribal history of the Wampanoag Tribe of Aquinnah, the giant Moshup turned his pet toad to stone before disappearing from Noepe.
	Tracy's Rock	Taurus–Littrow, Moon	Boulder at the Apollo 17 landing site named after the daughter of astronaut Gene Cernan
	Tripod Rock	Kinnelon, New Jersey, United States	Gneiss boulder balanced on three smaller boulders.
	Troctolite 76535	Lunar Sample Laboratory Facility, Houston, Texas, United States	Moon rock collected by Apollo 17 astronauts.
	Twelve-angled stone	Cuzco, Peru	Diorite stone part of a wall of an Inca palace.
	Unspunnen Stone	Interlaken, Canton of Bern, Switzerland	Aare granite from Haslital.
	Uluru (Ayers Rock)	Northern Territory, Australia	A large sandstone monolith near the center of Australia.
	Vingerklip	Namibia	A 35m tall rock needle built up from sedimentary rock layers.
	Wave Rock	Western Australia, Australia	A natural rock formation that is shaped like a tall breaking ocean wave.
	Wedgwood Rock	Wedgwood, Seattle, Washington, United States	Glacial erratic in a residential neighborhood.
	West Maple Omaha Rock	Omaha, Nebraska, United States	Boulder in a parking lot that became famous on the internet.
	Witches' Stone	St Martins, Perth and Kinross, Scotland	Supposed location where Shakespeare's Macbeth meets with two witches. First mentioned in 1806.
	Wolf Rock	Mansfield, Connecticut, United States	Glacial erratic perched atop a 40-foot cliff on a 108-acre nature preserve.
	Yeager Rock	Waterville Plateau, Washington, United States	Glacial erratic; part of the Sims Corner Eskers and Kames National Natural Landmark.
	Zanata Stone	Museo de la Naturaleza y Arqueología, Tenerife, Canary Islands, Spain	Engraved stone stele discovered in 1992.

== See also ==
- List of largest meteorites on Earth
- List of longest natural arches
- List of rock formations
- List of rock formations that resemble human beings
- List of rocks on Mars
- Lists of rocks in Western Australia
- List of standing stones
- Monoliths
- Moon rocks
- Stolen and missing Moon rocks
- Stones of Scotland
- Glacial erratic
  - of Estonia
  - of Rügen
  - of Washington State, United States
    - of Island County, Washington
    - of King County, Washington
    - of Kitsap County, Washington
    - of Snohomish County, Washington
    - of the Puget Sound region
