= Octopus stone =

Geologic formation in Japan

Coordinates: 34.680971°N 135.52840°E

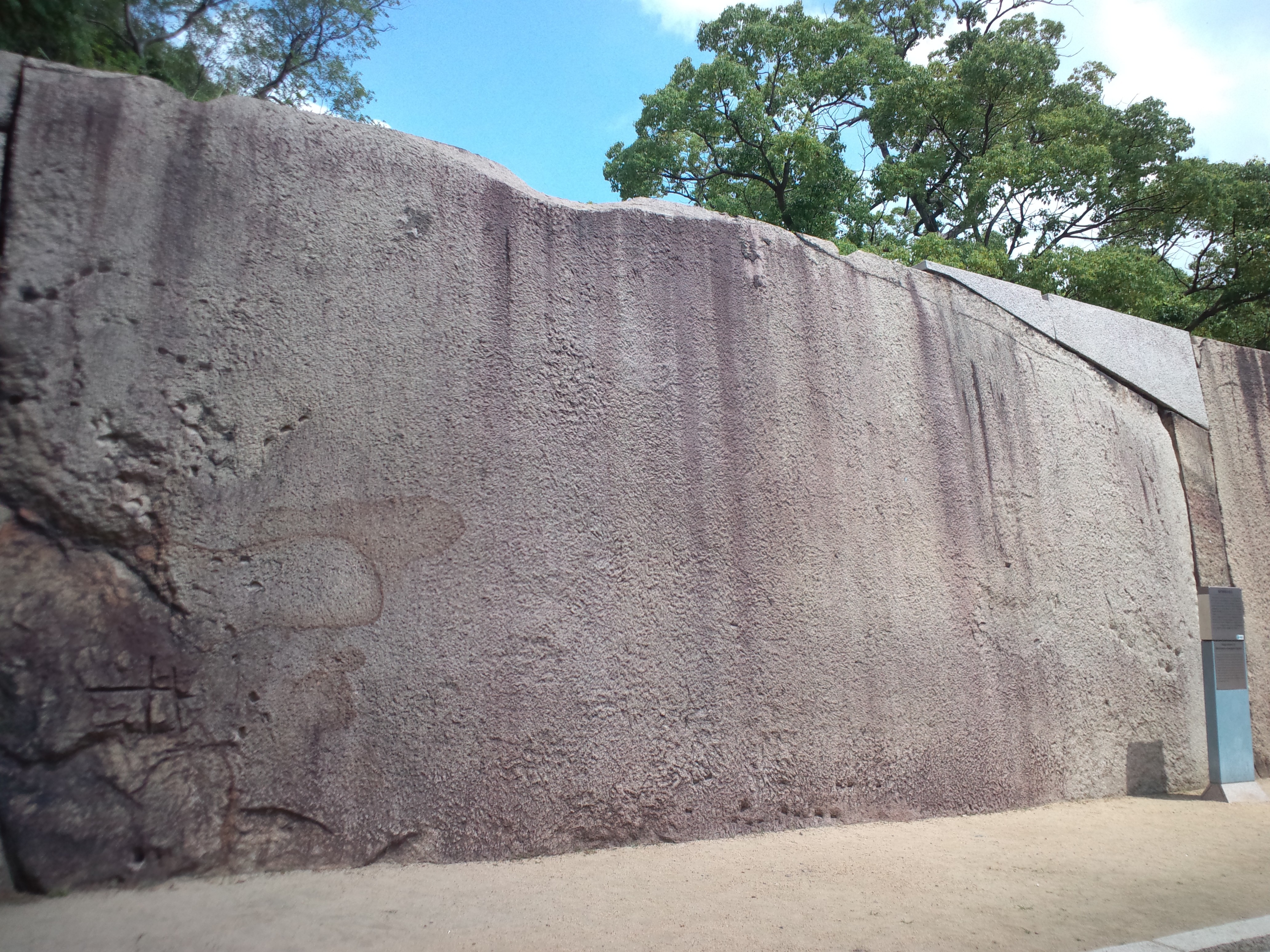
Octopus stone

The octopus stone, Taiko-ishi 蛸石 (also called "Drum Rock") is a large stone at Osaka Castle in Japan. The stone is near Sakura Gate.

It is one of the largest of several megaliths at the castle (by face area), at 5.5×11.7 meters and over 120 tonnes (130 tons). Its name is derived from the octopus shape visible on its lower left corner.

== See also ==
- List of individual rocks
