= Green Mountain Giant =

Glacial erratic

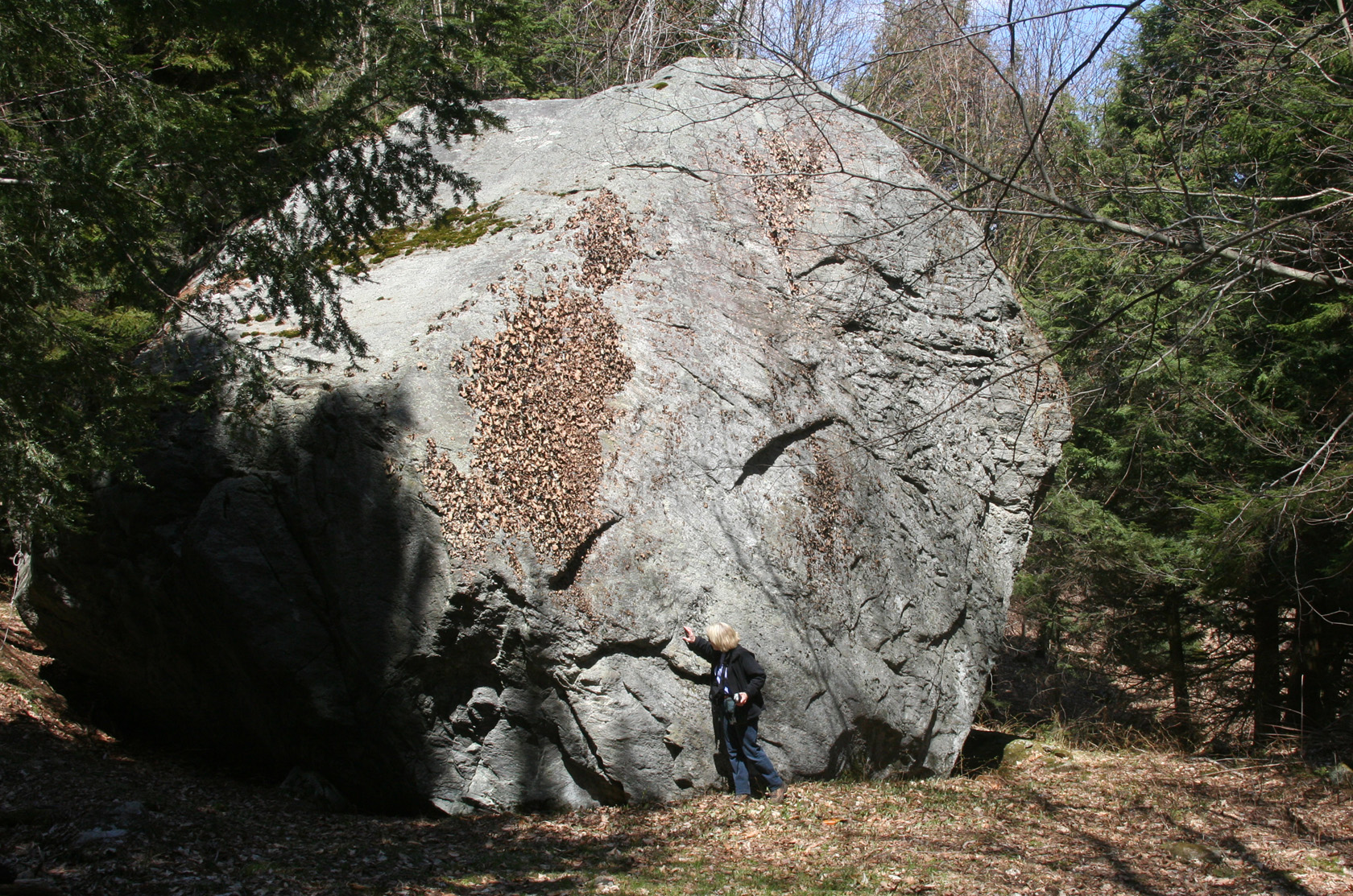

- Location within Vermont
- Location: Whitingham, Vermont, United States
- Coordinates: 42°46′28″N 72°54′02″W

The Green Mountain Giant is one of the largest glacial erratics in New England. It is located in Whitingham, Vermont. It was plucked from the Green Mountains by moving glaciers (Laurentide Ice Sheet) and was dropped as the ice retreated. Its circumference is 125 feet, and its weight is 3400 tons. It has been documented by geologists since Edward Hitchcock (Vermont State Geologist 1856 – 1861).

== See also ==
- List of individual rocks
