= Sentinel Rock State Park =

State park in Orleans County, Vermont

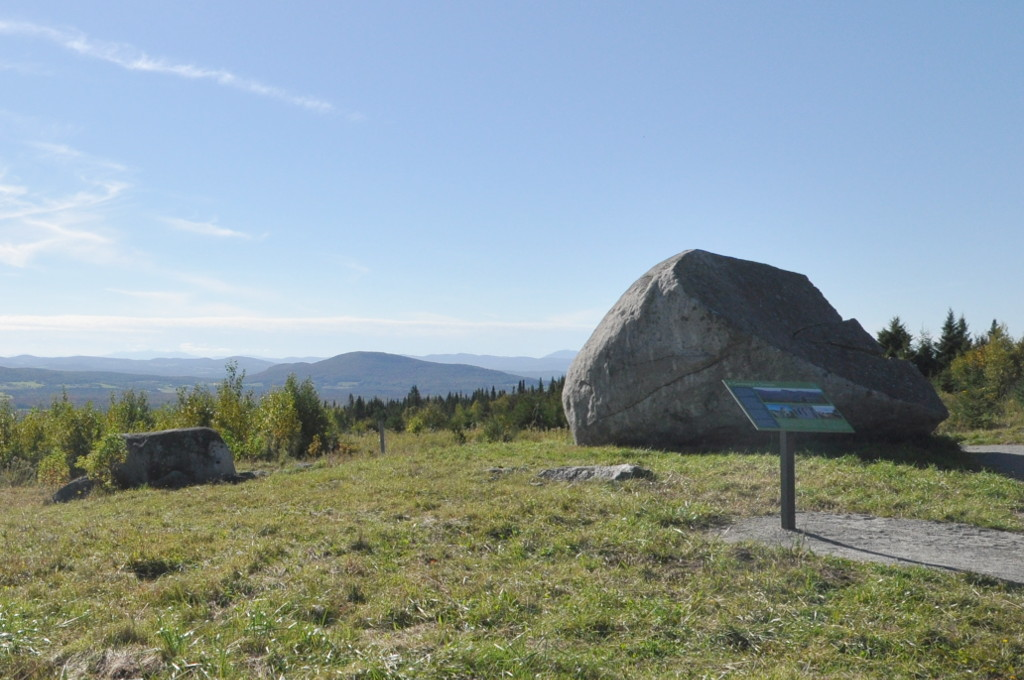
- Interactive map of Sentinel Rock State Park
- Type: State park
- Location: Hinton Hill Road; Westmore, Vermont
- Coordinates: 44.7935°N 72.0325°W
- Area: 356 acres (144 ha)
- Created: 2015
- Operator: Vermont Department of Forests, Parks, and Recreation
- Open: Day use
- Website: Sentinel Rock State Park

Sentinel Rock State Park is a 356-acre (144 ha) state park in Westmore, Vermont. It is open for hiking, educational pursuits, hunting, and trapping.

The property is named after its signature feature, Sentinel Rock, a huge glacial boulder situated at an elevation of about 2,034 feet (620 m) above sea level. The park is mostly undeveloped, and features a parking area, interpretative signage and ADA accessible trails that lead visitors to Sentinel Rock and to the former site of a farmhouse.

The land was previously a farm and was donated to the state in 1997 by its owner, Windsor Wright. Portions of the park continue to be managed as sustainable agricultural and forest land.

== See also ==
- List of individual rocks
