= Rollstone Boulder =

Glacial erratic in Fitchburg, Massachusetts

- Glacial erratic
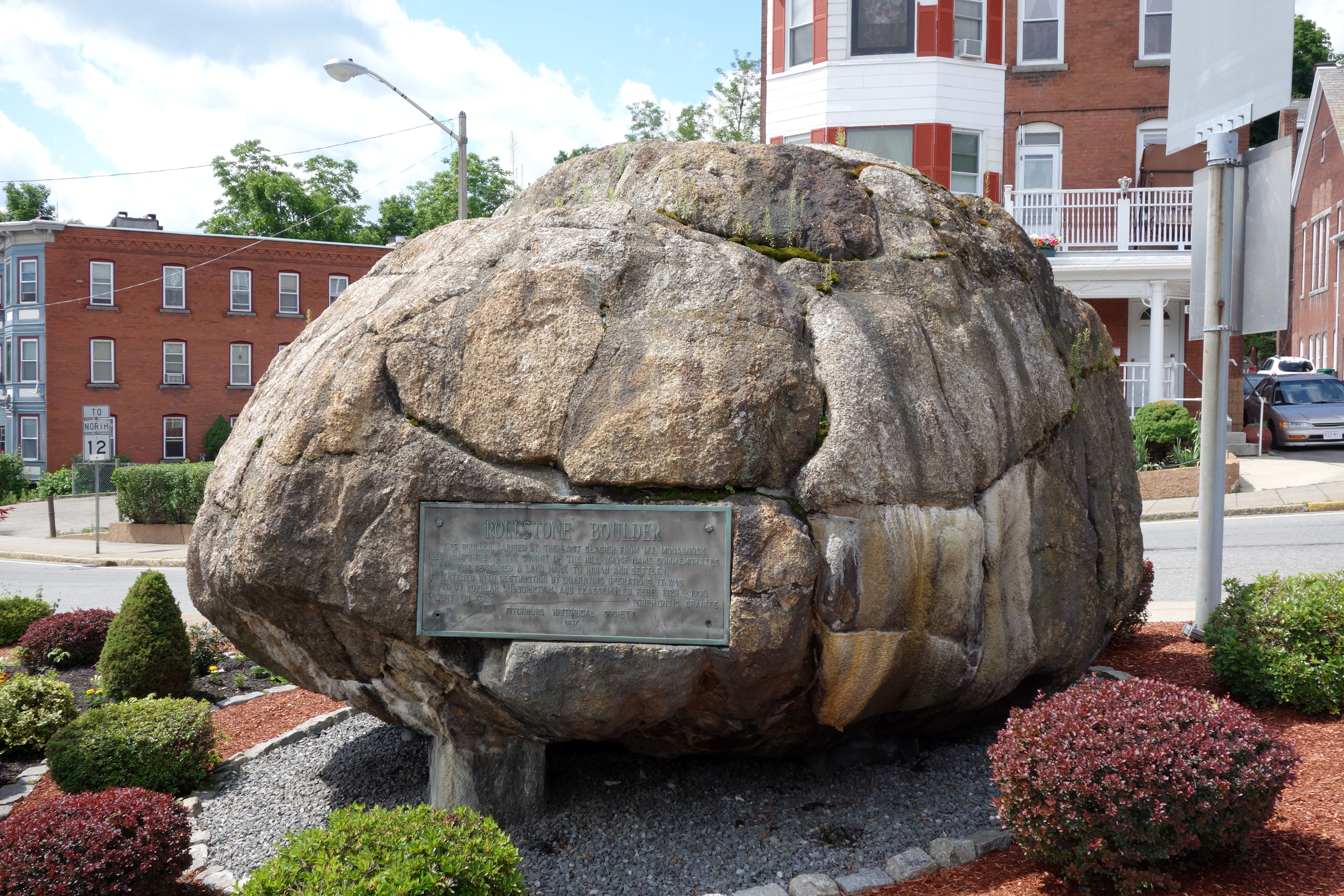

- Location within Massachusetts
- Coordinates: 42.58668°N 71.80595°W
- Location: Fitchburg, Massachusetts
- Formed by: porphyritic granite
- Geology: glacial erratic

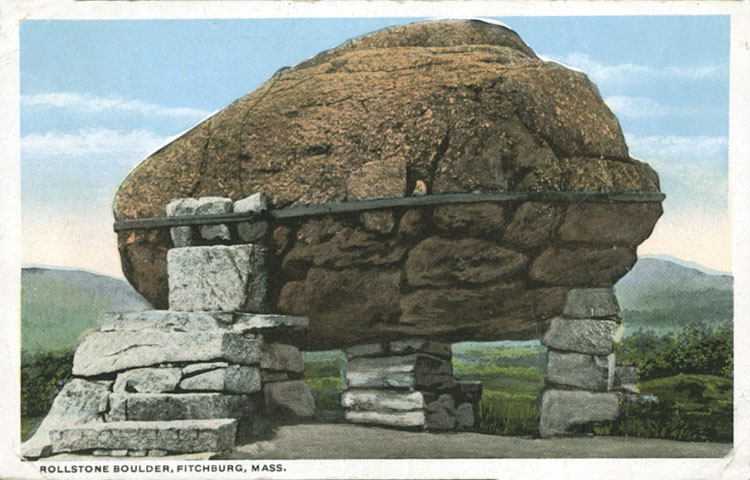
The Rollstone Boulder, on the summit of Rollstone Hill in 1909

The Rollstone Boulder is a ten-foot-tall, 110-ton porphyritic granite glacial erratic located on a traffic island in downtown Fitchburg, Massachusetts. The boulder was exploded at its original location at the summit of Rollstone Hill and then reassembled near Fitchburg's Upper Common in 1929 from the pieces.

== Geology ==
The Rollstone Boulder is a granite glacial erratic described by Peter Cristofono in his article "Minerals of Rollstone Hill" as being composed of "porphyritic Kinsman quartz monzonite." The phenocrysts in the boulder are plainly visible large white feldspar crystals. The boulder weighs 110 short tons (100 t) and is 10 feet (3.0 m) tall. It was likely moved to Fitchburg from central New Hampshire, as there are ridges located in and near the towns of Bradford and Warner that are of the same composition as the stone.

== History ==
During the Ice Age, a glacier deposited a 45-foot (14 m) diameter rock weighing "at least one hundred tons" on the summit of Rollstone Hill. Over time this boulder became a landmark where people would hike to and picnic. The elements began wearing away at the boulder, and by 1899 large cracks had appeared in it. These cracks were filled with cement, and an iron band circling the stone was added by Thomas Archibald of Lunenburg, Massachusetts. Quarrying began on Rollstone Hill and throughout the 19th century the granite from here was used throughout Fitchburg and the eastern United States. The granite was used in the construction of walls, columns, and bridges including ones across the Nashua River and five across the Hudson River including the George Washington Bridge. By the late 1800s concerns began to be raised that this quarrying was encroaching upon the landmark boulder. At the Fitchburg Historical Society meeting on May 18, 1896 Charles Fosdick brought up this encroachment and his concerns about it. A committee was formed to speak with the owners of the quarries to see if the boulder could be preserved. Nothing came from this and another committee was appointed on April 15, 1901 to see if it was possible to save the stone. They reported over a year later, on May 19, 1902, that the boulder would be moved and not destroyed at no cost to the historical society. A vote was taken to approve the action, but the boulder was not moved until it was in immediate danger on September 2, 1929.

In 1929 the two quarries on Rollstone Hill began removing the final section of the hill between them where the Rollstone boulder was perched. At the urging of state representative Louis N. M. Des Chenes, the mayor of Fitchburg, Joseph N. Carriere, forced the quarries to halt operations so the boulder could be removed. The plans for moving the boulder were fairly simple as all that seemed to be holding the stone together was the iron band encircling it. The plan was to remove this band and the subsequent pieces the boulder crumbled into were to be moved to a small triangular traffic island in downtown Fitchburg to be reassembled. Lines and numbers were painted on the Rollstone Boulder and it was meticulously photographed and drawn so that it could be reassembled exactly the same as it was before the move. After all this planning and documentation, when the iron band was removed the boulder did not fall apart. It took multiple blasts with black powder to even crack the stone. After it was broken into smaller pieces, they were all transported to its new home.

J. Marc Leblanc, a local stonemason, was given the task of reassembling the Rollstone Boulder. The tough job was made even tougher due to streetcars going by the work site jarring loose stones after they had already been placed. After months of work and all of the money the city had put aside for the project was exhausted, Leblanc could not reassemble it. Out of money and out of time the project was transferred to a special committee headed by U. S. Senator Marcus A. Coolidge. The committee, state representative Des Chenes, and Leblanc decided the best way to go forward with restoring the boulder would be to discard the inside and only reassemble the exterior portion of the stone. Des Chenes explains, "We just used the outside and tied the parts together with iron rods ... We drilled holes and hooked the rods to the insides of the rock. After the shell of the boulder was fixed in place, Leblanc poured in concrete and filled it up."

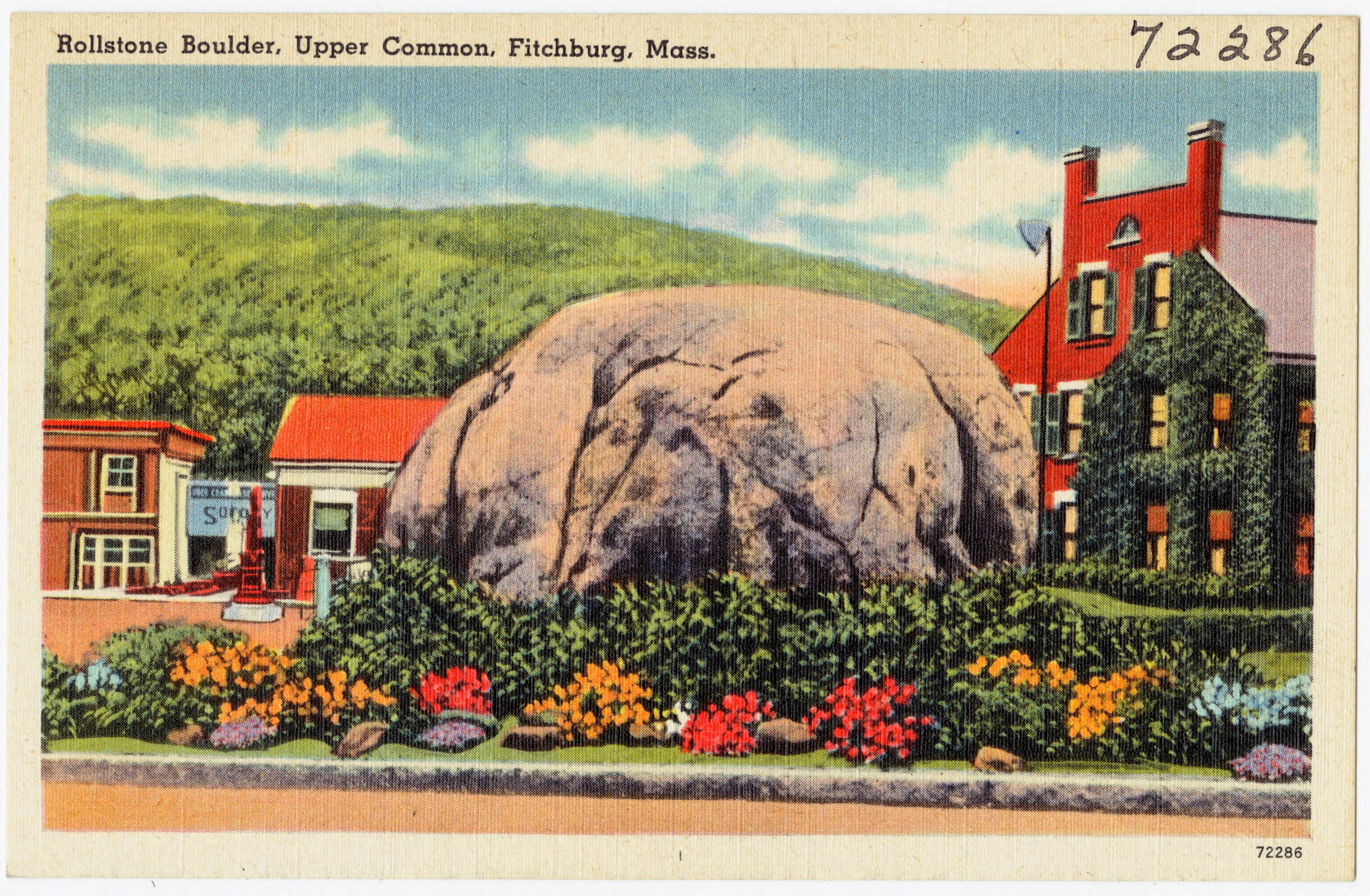
The Rollstone Boulder in Fitchburg's upper common on a postcard sometime between 1930 and 1945

After the reconstruction, the Rollstone Boulder appeared the same as it did before and is in the same orientation as when it was on Rollstone hill. In 1930 a plaque was attached to the boulder by the Fitchburg Historical society, which stated:

This boulder, carried by the last glacier from Mt. Monadnock, New Hampshire to the summit of the hill whose name commemorates it, was for centuries a land mark to Indian and Settler. Threatened with destruction by quarrying operations, it was saved by popular subscription and reassembled here. 1920–1930

The plaque is misleading as the Rollstone Boulder was not brought from Mt. Monadnock, just somewhere in central New Hampshire, there was no popular subscription to save it, and no citizens of Fitchburg were asked to raise money for its move.

== Namesakes ==
The Rollstone Boulder has become an eponym for many things in Fitchburg. The namesakes include both a Rollstone Street, a Boulder Drive, The Boulder Cafe Est. 1934, and a nearby downtown art gallery is also called the "Boulder Art Gallery", as it sits "In the Shadow of the Rollstone Boulder". In 2008 Fitchburg Savings Bank changed its name to Rollstone Bank and Trust with the slogan "Rock Solid Banking Since 1846."

== See also ==
- List of individual rocks
