= West Maple Omaha Rock =

Boulder in Omaha, Nebraska and internet meme

Coordinates: 41.290605°N 96.159025°W

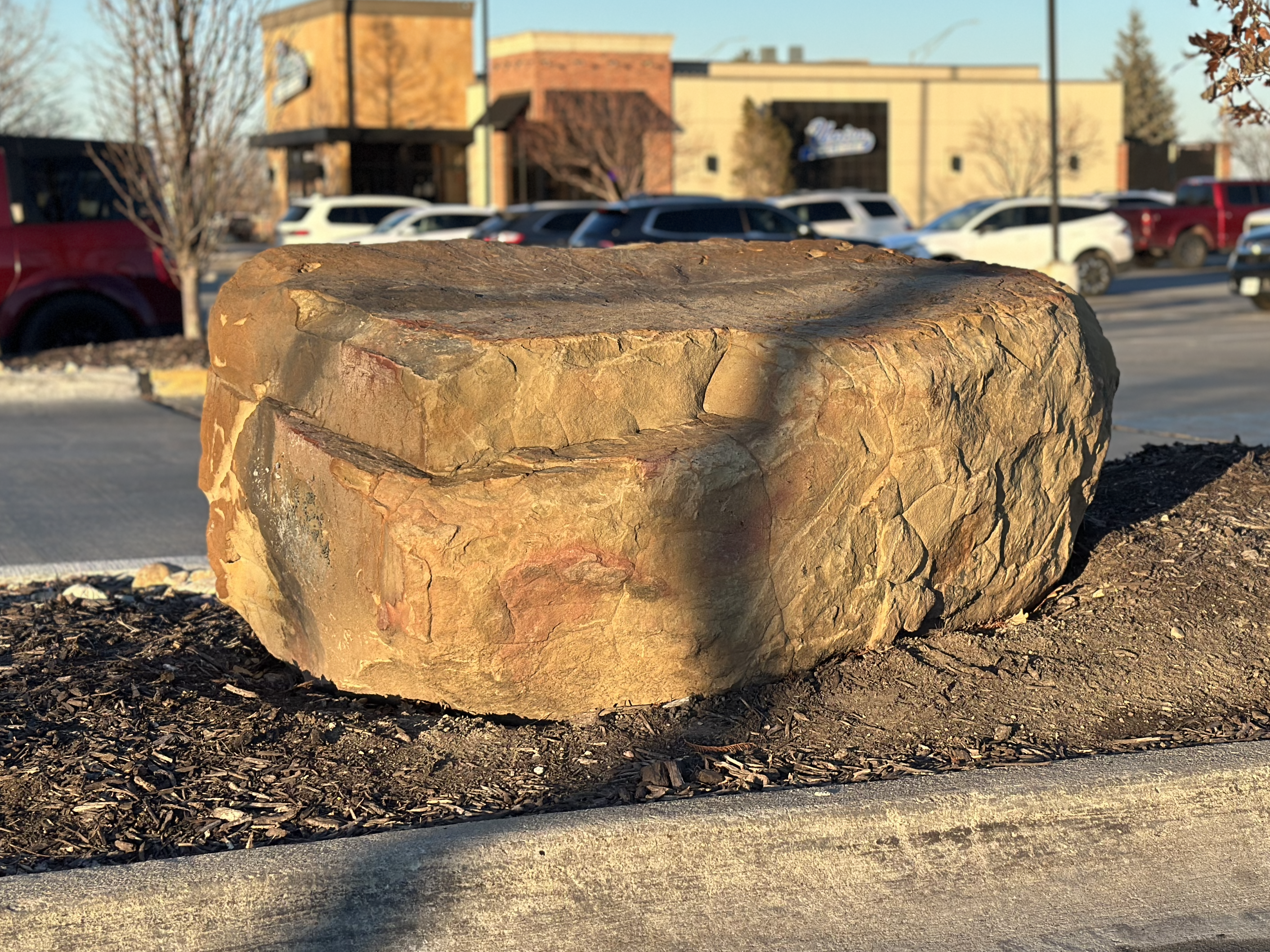
The Rock in December 2024

The West Maple Omaha Rock (nicknamed Rocko, also referred to as the west Omaha rock "Omarock" and other similar names) is a boulder located in a parking lot at the corner of West Maple Road and North 156th Street in north-western Omaha, Nebraska, in the United States.

== History ==
The rock became the subject of significant online discourse as well as a local tourist attraction in late 2019 after over a dozen vehicle owners drove on top of it. This included at least six that had to be towed within six weeks. The rock was originally placed on a curb to prevent people from driving over it; however, it was sloped such that it was often not visible to taller automobiles and would get stuck between their wheels.

A Facebook group dedicated to the rock, "The W Maple Omaha Rock", was created by employees of a nearby UPS Store and had over 25,000 followers in November 2019. A subreddit and Google Maps listing were also created.

In January 2021, the rock was repositioned such that it was no longer sloped towards the road and a tree was planted near it to catch drivers' attention.

== See also ==
- List of individual rocks
