= Seatbelt basalt =

Lunar rock collected during the Apollo 15 mission

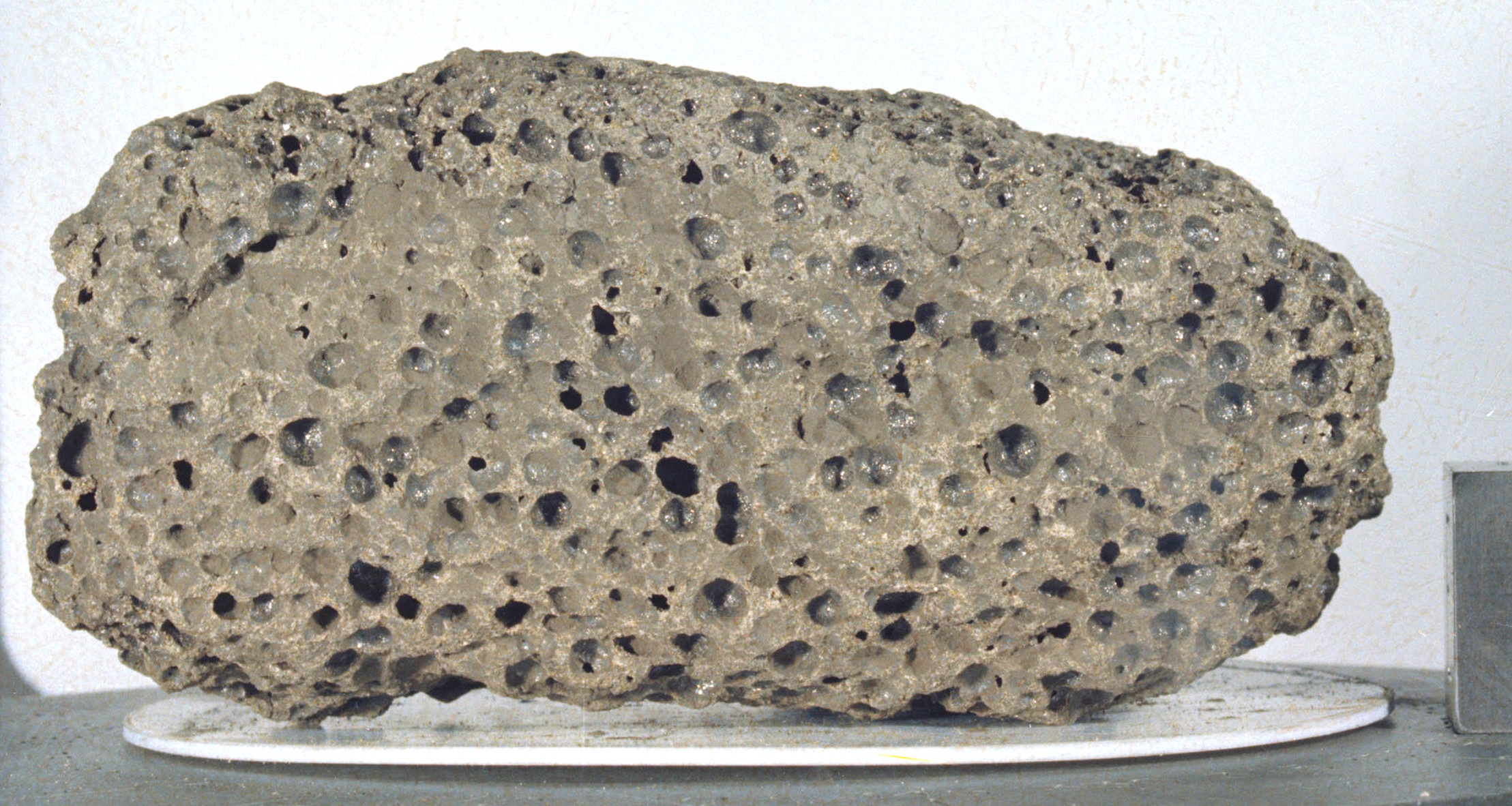
Sample 15016, the Seatbelt Basalt

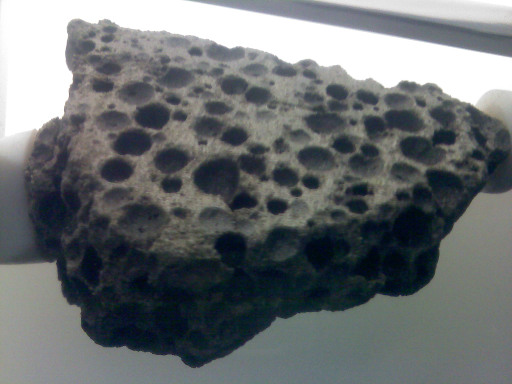
Cut fragment on display at the National Air and Space Museum

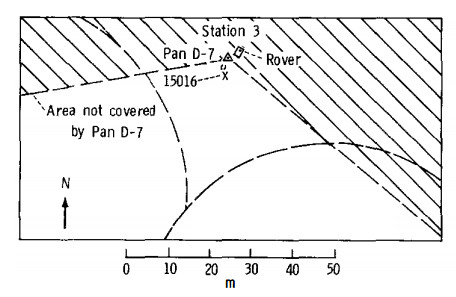
Planimetric map of Station 3 from the Apollo 15 Preliminary Science Report. X indicates sample locations, 5-digit numbers are LRL sample numbers, rectangle is lunar rover (dot indicates TV camera), black spots are large rocks, dashed lines are crater rims or other topographic features, and triangles are panorama stations.

Lunar Sample 15016, better known as the "Seatbelt Basalt", is a lunar sample discovered and collected on the Apollo 15 mission in 1971 in the Hadley-Apennine region of the Moon. The rock is a 0.923 kg (2.03 lb) vesicular olivine basalt.

It is so named because mission commander, David Scott, noticed it on the surface while driving the Lunar Roving Vehicle and stopped to collect it, but said to mission control that he was just fastening his seatbelt. He did this because he assumed mission control would not give permission to stop for a sample collection due to time constraints. This unplanned stop was later designated Geology Station 3, located about 125 metres (410 ft) west of Rhysling crater.

This sample was collected from an area with abundant subdued craters between 0.1 and 1 metre (0.33 and 3.28 ft) in diameter. The sample is a very vesicular basalt, rounded by surface erosion. Lithologically, it closely resembles samples 15535 and 15536, as well as a number of fragments in the rake samples from station 9A.

The seatbelt basalt is currently stored at the Lunar Sample Laboratory Facility at the Lyndon B. Johnson Space Center. A piece of it is on display at the National Air and Space Museum in Washington, DC.

== Description ==
The seatbelt basalt is a highly-vesicular, olivine-normative, basalt with phenocrysts of zoned pyroxene and olivine within a matrix of pyroxene and plagioclase. The rock also contains ilmenite and ulvöspinel.

== Age ==
The rock's cosmic ray exposure age was discovered to be about 285 million years. Another study determined the age to be 315 million years.

The rock's age of formation has been estimated to be approximately 3.29 ± 0.05 billion years from Rb-Sr radiometric dating.

== See also ==
- List of individual rocks
