= Hollywood Stone =

Boulder in Ireland

The Hollywood Stone is a large boulder discovered in 1908 near Hollywood, County Wicklow, Ireland. It is currently on display in a museum in Glendalough, County Wicklow.

== Description ==
The granite boulder measures around 1.2 metres by 0.9 metres. A labyrinth pattern, measuring 70 centimetres in diameter, is carved on the boulder. Its design suggests that it was carved during the Middle Ages. Due to the boulder being chipped, a section of the pattern is missing.

== Discovery ==
The Hollywood Stone was discovered in 1908 near Hollywood, County Wicklow by a group who were chasing a stoat. The boulder was removed from its location in 1925 and was put on display at the National Museum in Dublin before being placed in storage during the late 1980s. It was moved to a museum in Glendalough, County Wicklow around 20 years later.

== See also ==
- List of individual rocks
