= Gros Caillou =

Symbol of the Croix-Rousse district in Lyon, France

Coordinates: 45.7747°N 4.8352°E

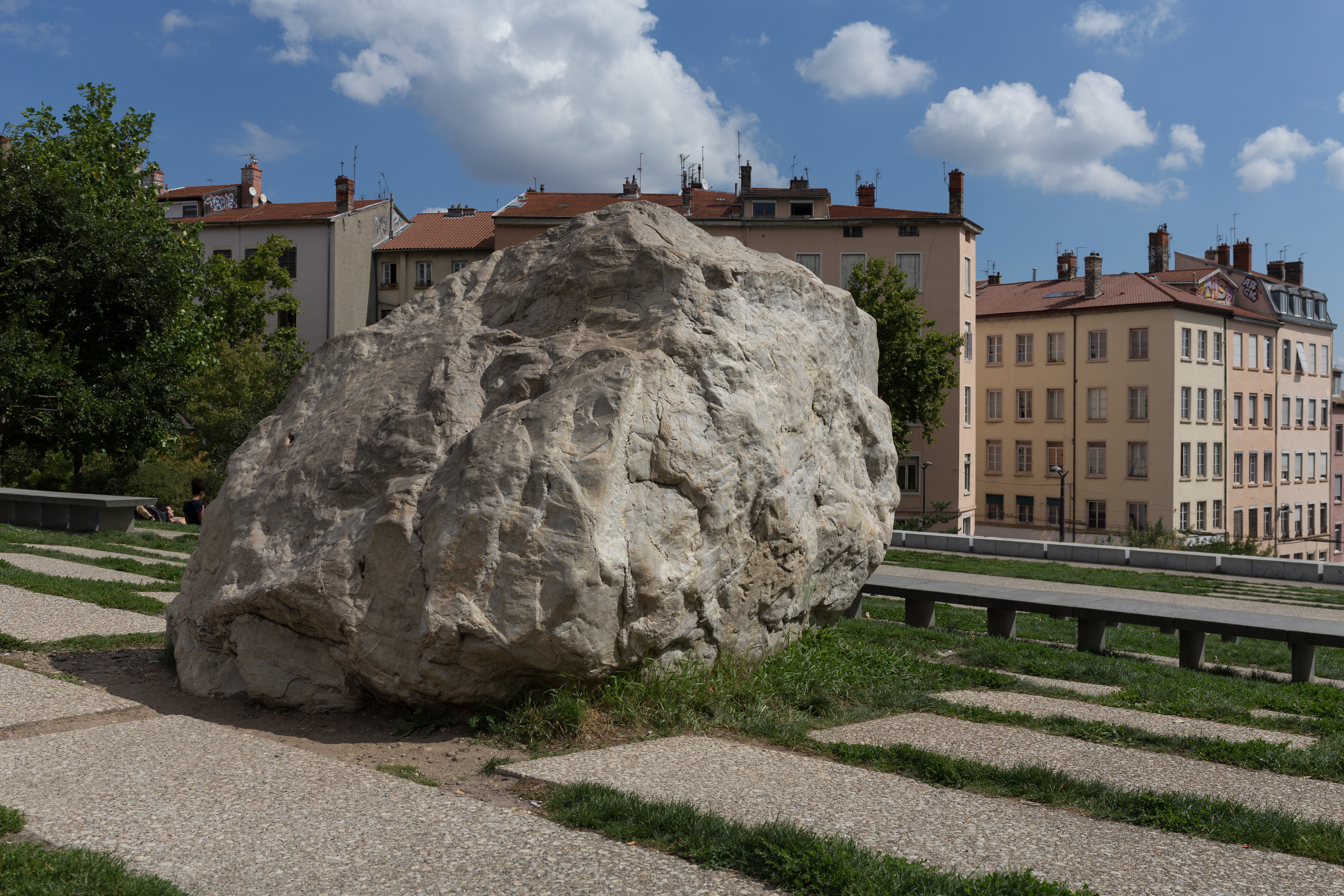
Gros Caillou

Gros Caillou (literally "big pebble") is a landmark of the French city of Lyon in the neighborhood Croix-Rousse. The rock's mineralogical composition suggests it is a glacial erratic, and would have been transported from the nearby Alps by slowly moving glaciers.

== Localization ==
Originally, Gros Caillou was located at the end of Boulevard de la Croix-Rousse, constructed in 1865, and the boundary between the 1st arrondissement (Croix-Rousse hill) and the 4th arrondissement (Croix-Rousse plateau). Until it was annexed in 1852, the Croix-Rousse Plateau was a separate city. Thus, the location of Gros Caillou at that intersection became a unifying symbol. At the beginning of the 21st century, an underground parking lot and green area took over this area and Gros Caillou was relocated 30m into the 1st arrondissement.

== History ==
Gros Caillou is a metamorphic Triassic quartzite, typical of the alpine regions of Haute-Maurienne and Haute Tarentaise. It is rock that was displaced by glaciers over 200 km during the Riss glaciation (around 140,000BC).

The discovery of Gros Caillou dates back to 1861 during drilling of the tunnels of a funicular linking downtown Lyon to the Croix-Rousse plateau. The drilling had to be interrupted as the workers were blocked by an extremely hard rock, which they could not break.

After many attempts and work stoppages, Gros Caillou was eventually excavated, becoming a symbol of not only the annexation of Croix-Rousse, but a symbol of the perseverance of Lyon's inhabitants. Had the funicular not been under construction, Gros Caillou would never have been found and relocated to the east side of Croix-Rousse boulevard, where to this day it overlooks the Rhône River and the Alps.

== Gallery ==
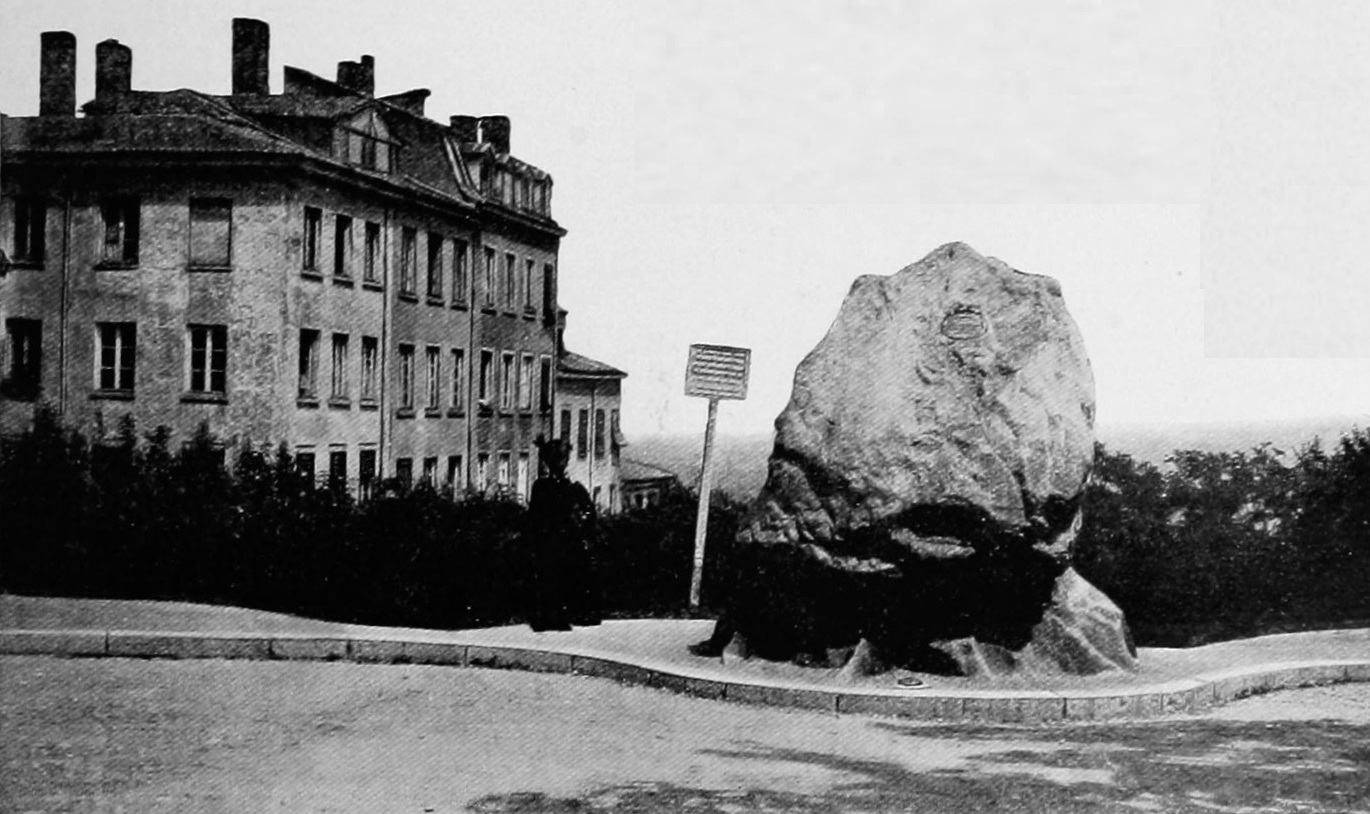
The Gros Caillou at the beginning of the 20th century.

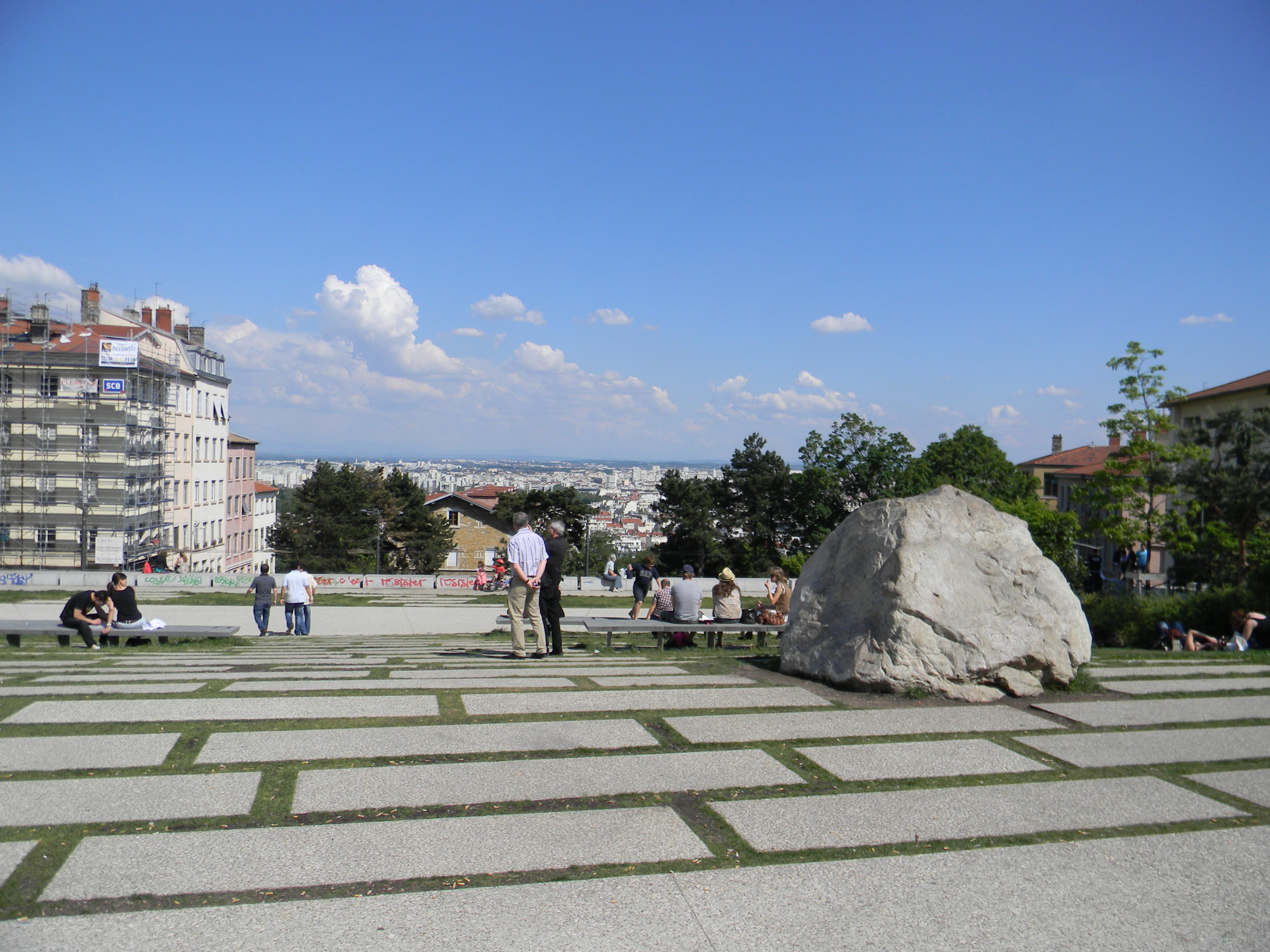

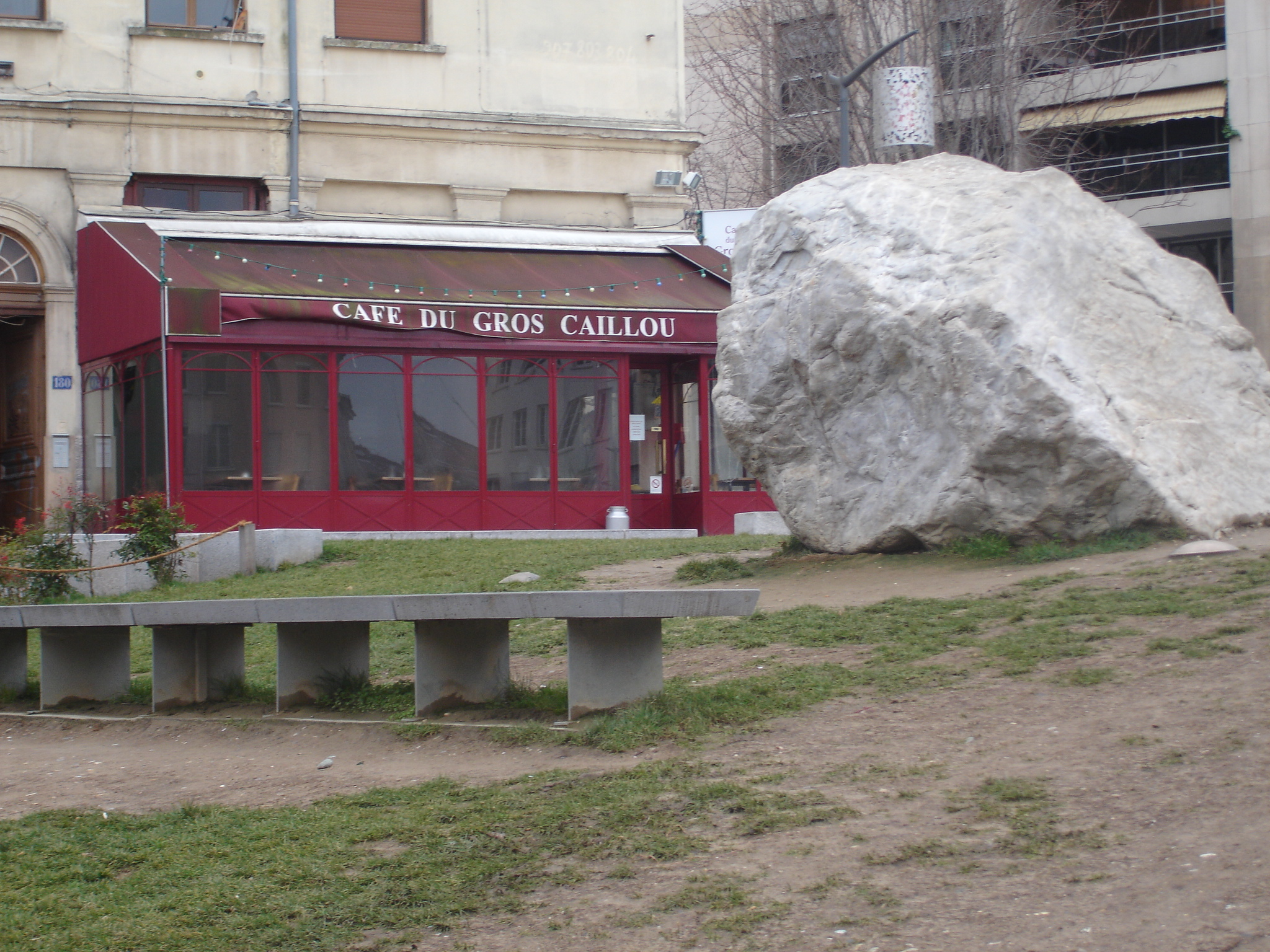
The Gros Caillou from a different angle.

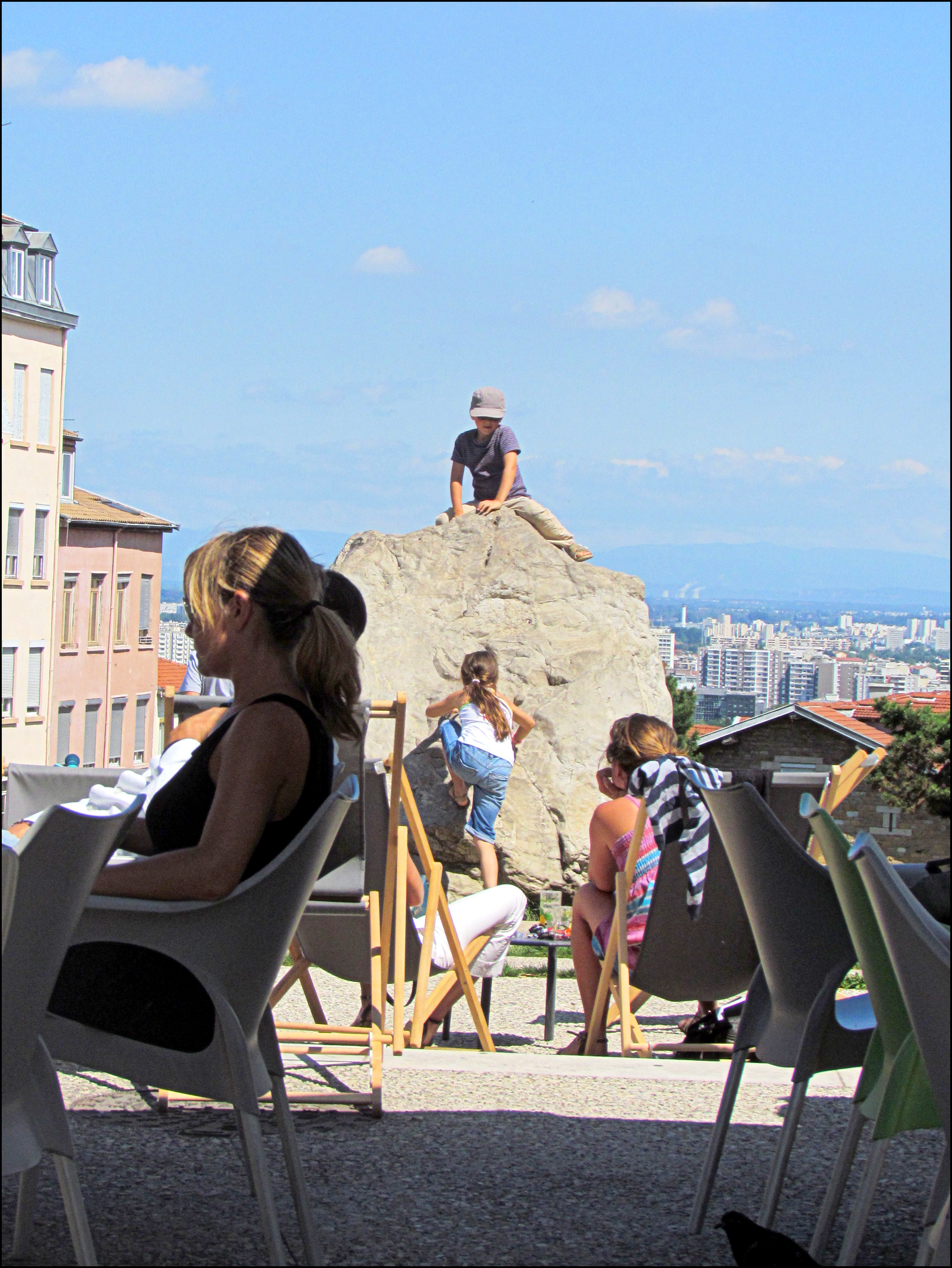
The Gros Caillou is a playground for local children.

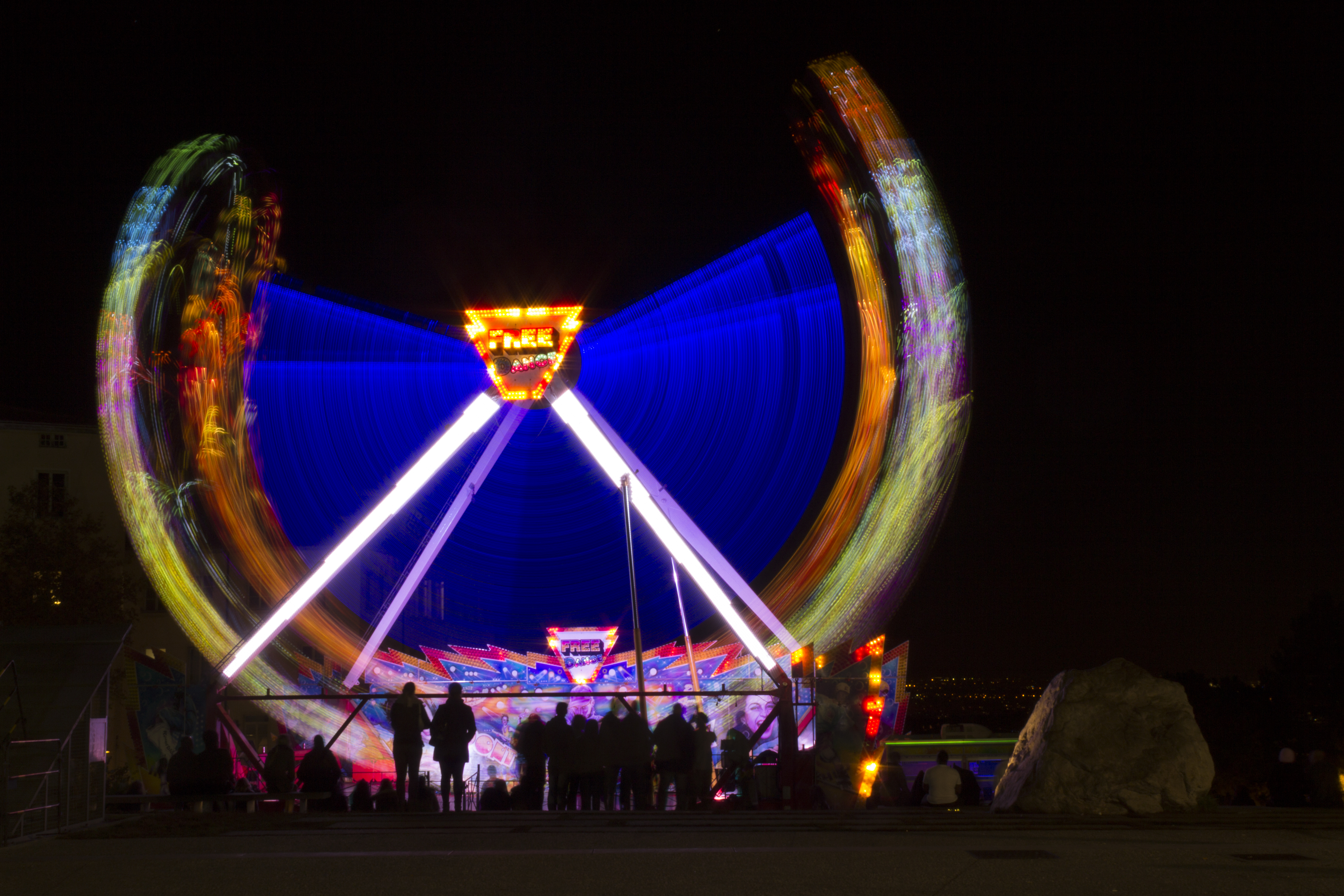
The Gros Caillou by night.

== See also ==
- List of individual rocks
