= Bowder Stone =

Large boulder in Cumbria, England

Coordinates: 54.537364°N 3.152929°W

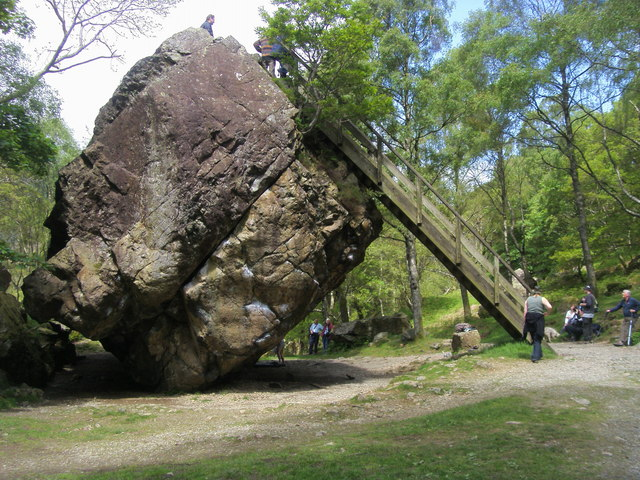
Bowder Stone, 2009

The Bowder Stone is a large andesite lava boulder, that fell 200 metres (660 ft) from the Bowder Crag on Kings How between 13,500 and 10,000 years ago. The stone is situated in Borrowdale, Cumbria, England, at grid reference NY25401639. It is estimated to weigh around 2000 tons and is about 30 feet (9.1 m) high, 50 feet (15 m) across and 90 feet (27 m) in circumference. There is a staircase allowing visitors to climb to the top, and has been since at least 1890.

== Etymology ==
The name may come from the local dialect for 'boulder' although a popular story is its derivation from the Norse god Baldr, a son of Odin. Other versions of the name are 'The Bowdar Stone' and 'Powder or Bounder Stone'. In 1772 William Gilpin wrote that it seemed not to be "..rent from the mountains,.." and was an "..independent creation..", using the name Boother-stone.

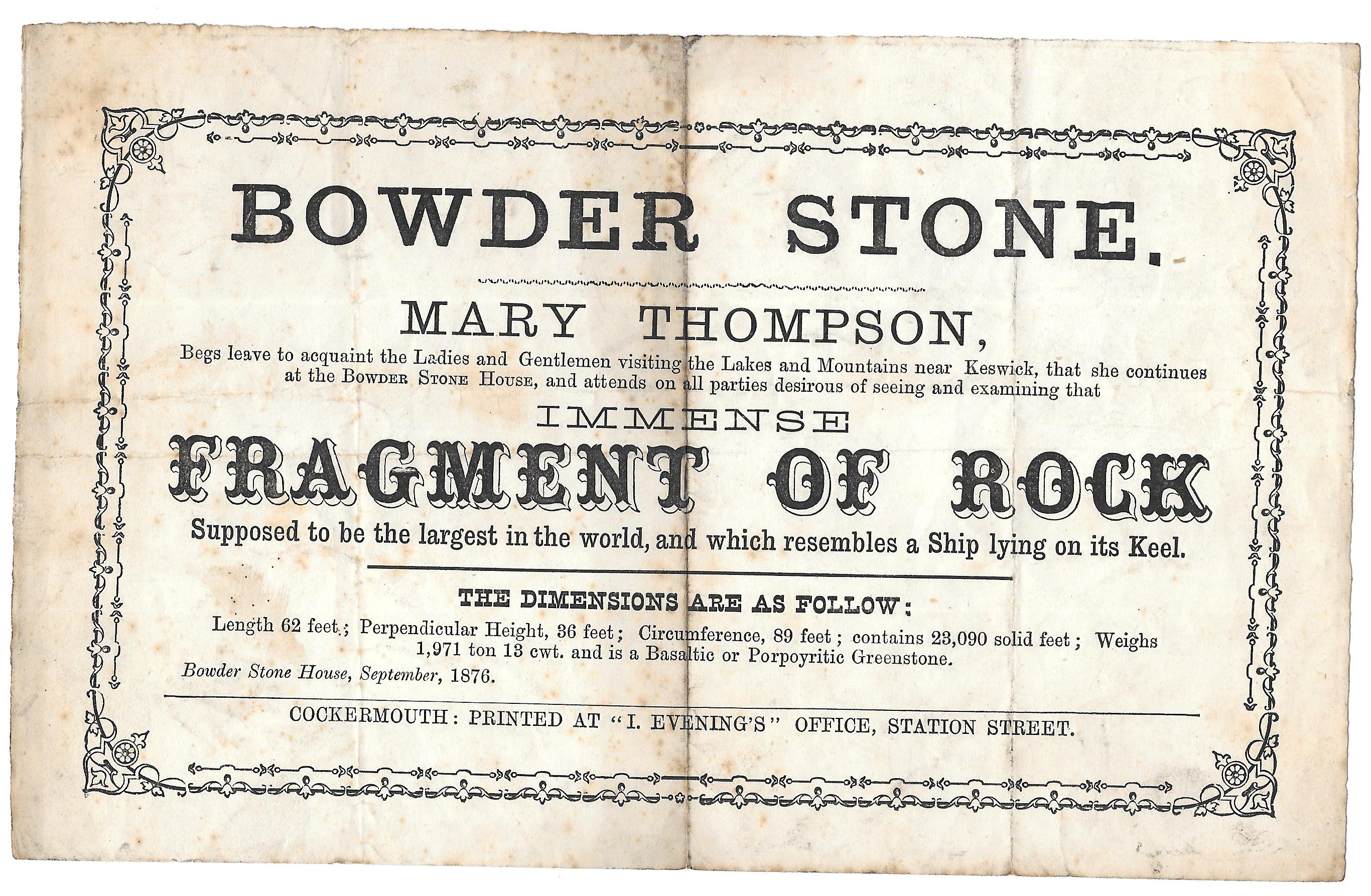
Victorian advertising flyer for the Bowder Stone, dated 1876 and printed in Cockermouth, Cumbria, UK

== History ==
=== Balder ===
As stated, it is popularly said that the name equates with Baldr, the second son of the god Odin. Baldr is best known for being slain through the actions of Loki with an arrow or spear made of mistletoe. One side of the Bowder Stone is said to be a simulacrum of the face of Baldr and a small hole is said to have once existed on his head where in Norse mythology the weapon pierced and killed him. A carving representing the sun was supposedly located just above the hole. The oldest photographs show a well-defined chin and lips whilst a second face is seen by some.

In the 1500s German miners emigrated to Borrowdale to work the copper mines and the legends of 'Baldr' may have come with them.

=== Mr. Pocklington ===
Although the stone was visited and admired by many, such as William Sawrey Gilpin in 1772, Joseph Pocklington was the first to take practical steps to attract visitors, purchasing the site in 1798, fencing it off, clearing away all the smaller rocks and erecting 'Bowderstone Cottage' to house a guide and building a ladder to allow visitors to easily reach the top and admire the outstanding views. In addition to all this activity Joseph designed a hermitage or chapel himself as a Christian counterpoint to the 'druidical' standing stone or menhir that he had also erected.

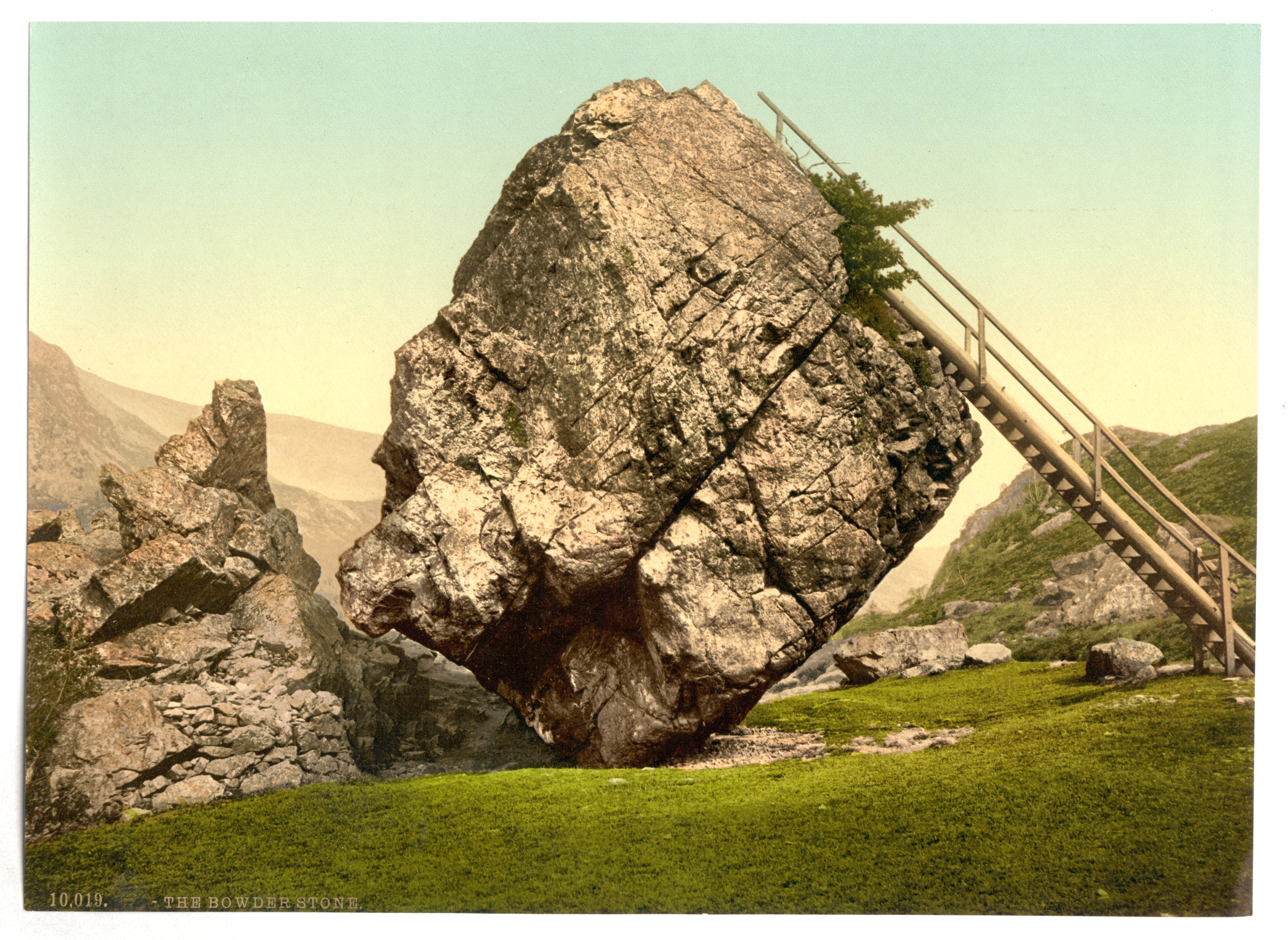
Bowder Stone, 1890s

During the works a natural hollow was discovered that ran underneath the boulder and Joseph had a small hole drilled through its base, thereby creating a space that made it possible for visitors to crawl into the hollow to have a ‘hand shake for luck’ with the guide or with another visitor on the other side of the Stone.

At first Joseph Pocklington took his friends by coach to admire the Bowder Stone, however later it was opened up to all and large numbers of travellers were escorted around the site by the guide that he employed. In 1817 Joseph died and the Bowder Stone was sold, however it continued to be open to all visitors. It continued as a popular tourist venue throughout the Victorian era and well into the early 20th century. Broken only by the presence of John Raven, the role of guide continued being female. Mary Carradus was the guide in the 1830s, succeeded in the 1850s by her daughter who married to become Mary Thompson, acting as a guide for 25 years or more.

A gate had been installed at the bottom of the ladder to ensure that visitors paid a small fee to climb to the top. Various records indicate that the guides were assiduous in their duties, with comments such as "The old dame makes money out of the stone watching for tourists like a spider." A seat for two and standing room for six existed on the summit of the stone.

The Peppers were the last family to live at the Bowder Stone, keeping a visitors’ book that recorded tourists that included "cabinet ministers, undergraduates, professors, publicists, walkers, lawyers", etc. amongst their number.

== The National Trust ==
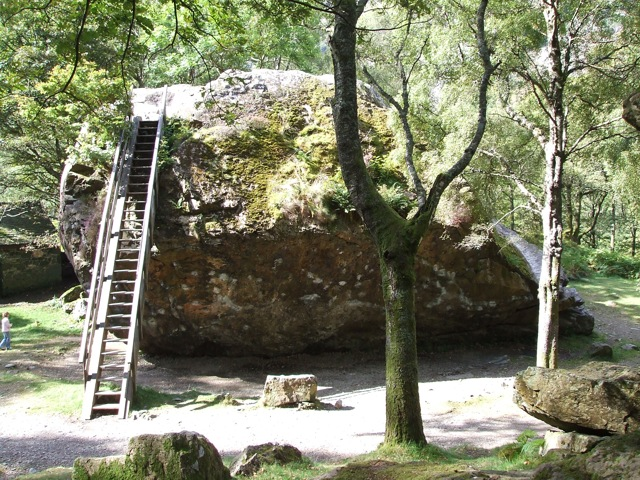
The Bowder Stone steps and summit

The National Trust now cares for the Bowder Stone. The access beneath the boulder is now blocked and no refreshments or souvenirs are available, however Joseph's chapel and the Borrowdale Cottage have been restored as bothies for climbers. The ladder has been retained, and evidence from postcards suggest that at least six different ladders have been built over the years.

A car park has been created, which is about a 15-minute walk away from the stone; there is also a bus stop near the start of the access path.

== Bowder Stone Cottage and the Hermitage ==
The cottage was for a time used as a tearoom and shop, selling souvenirs such as stereoviews, Mauchline ware with engravings of the Bowder Stone in the form of penknives, boxes, pincushions, glasses cases, etc. Numerous postcards were also issued over the years.

In the 1960s the cottage was derelict, and after the National Trust purchased the site they leased it to the Northumbrian Mountaineering Club, who restored it to modern-day standards with electricity, running water, etc. The mountaineering club also lease the old Hermitage from the National Trust.

== Bouldering ==
The Bowder Stone has long attracted rock climbers, and today it is one of the most celebrated bouldering venues in the Lake District. The boulder features very hard bouldering on a roughly 45-degree roof, making it a testing ground for some of Britain's strongest climbers. The natural monolith provides diverse climbing opportunities, including crack climbs and highball bouldering, and the area is popular year-round. The stone's sheer size and variety of angles — from near-vertical walls to severely overhanging roof sections — give rise to a broad spectrum of problems challenging to advanced climbers. Among the most celebrated problems on the Bowderstone is The Crack, a sustained and technical line graded around Font 6c. The Crack has been ranked among the top 50 boulder problems in Britain UK Bouldering by the climbing community , recognised for its quality of movement and the character of the rock.

== See also ==
- List of individual rocks
