= Standing Rock, Alabama =

- Census-designated place
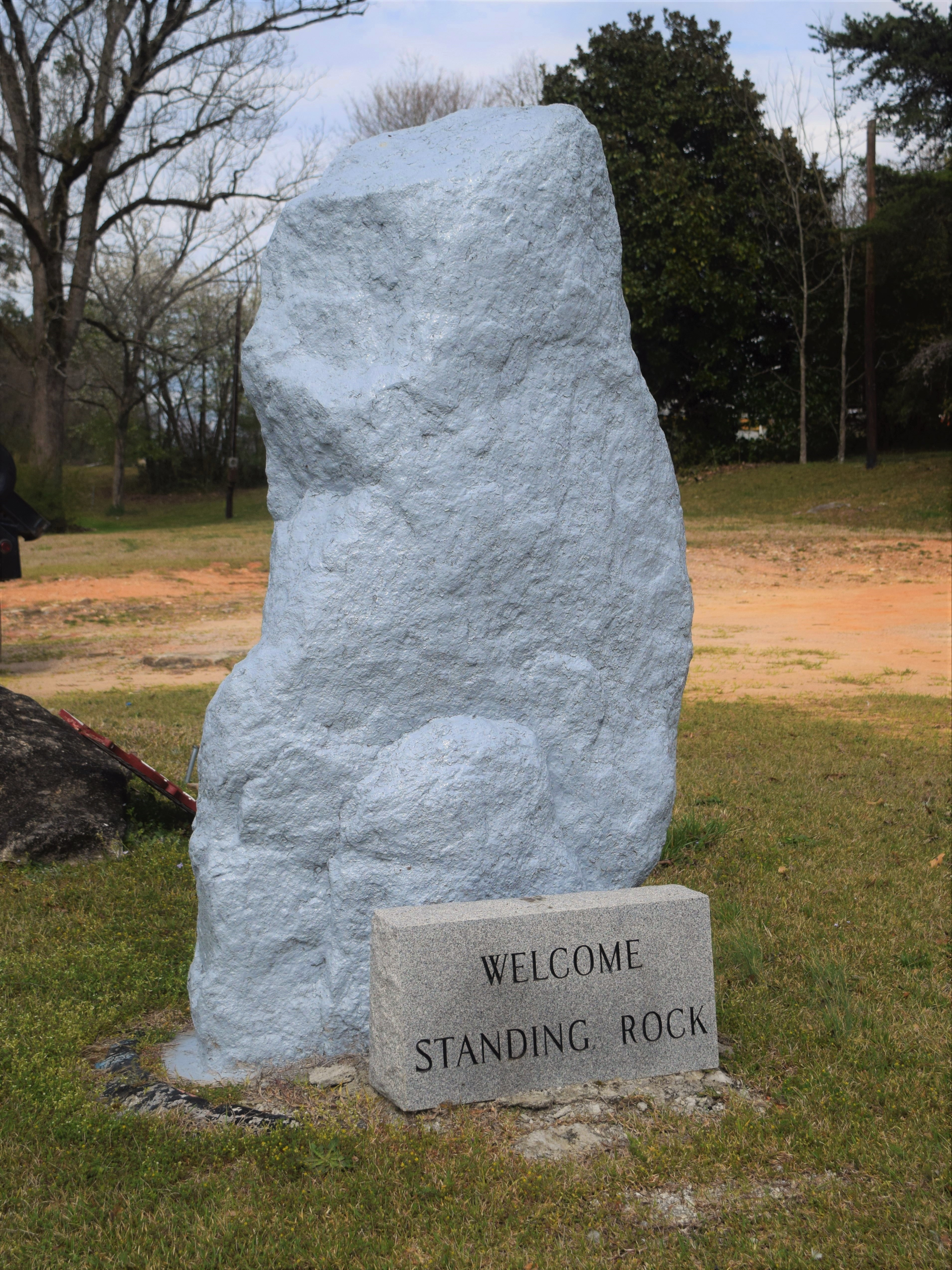
- Standing Rock, Alabama in 2021

- Location of Standing Rock in Chambers County, Alabama.
- Coordinates: 33°05′15″N 85°15′02″W
- Country: United States
- State: Alabama
- County: Chambers

Area
  - Total: 3.23 sq mi (8.36 km^{2})
  - Land: 3.19 sq mi (8.26 km^{2})
  - Water: 0.039 sq mi (0.10 km^{2})
- Elevation: 722 ft (220 m)

Population (2020)
  - Total: 132
  - Density: 41.4/sq mi (15.99/km^{2})
- Time zone: UTC-6 (Central (CST))
  - Summer (DST): UTC-5 (CDT)
- Area code: 334
- GNIS feature ID: 2582701

Standing Rock is a census-designated place and unincorporated community in Chambers County, Alabama, United States. Its population was 132 as of the 2020 census.

== Demographics ==
Historical population
Census	Pop.	Note	%±
1920	698		—
2010	168		—
2020	132		−21.4%
U.S. Decennial Census; 1850-1870 1870-1880; 1890-1910 1920 1930; 1940 1950 1960; 1970 1980 1990; 2000 2010

Standing Rock was first listed as a census designated place in the 2010 U.S. census.

Standing Rock CDP, Alabama – Racial and ethnic composition Note: the US Census treats Hispanic/Latino as an ethnic category. This table excludes Latinos from the racial categories and assigns them to a separate category. Hispanics/Latinos may be of any race.
Race / Ethnicity (NH = Non-Hispanic)	Pop 2010	Pop 2020	% 2010	% 2020
White alone (NH)	163	122	97.02%	92.42%
Black or African American alone (NH)	1	1	0.60%	0.76%
Native American or Alaska Native alone (NH)	0	0	0.00%	0.00%
Asian alone (NH)	0	0	0.00%	0.00%
Native Hawaiian or Pacific Islander alone (NH)	0	0	0.00%	0.00%
Other race alone (NH)	0	1	0.00%	0.76%
Mixed race or Multiracial (NH)	2	4	1.19%	3.03%
Hispanic or Latino (any race)	2	4	1.19%	3.03%
Total	168	132	100.00%	100.00%

== See also ==
- List of individual rocks
