= Kloochman Rock =

Natural feature in Washington, United States

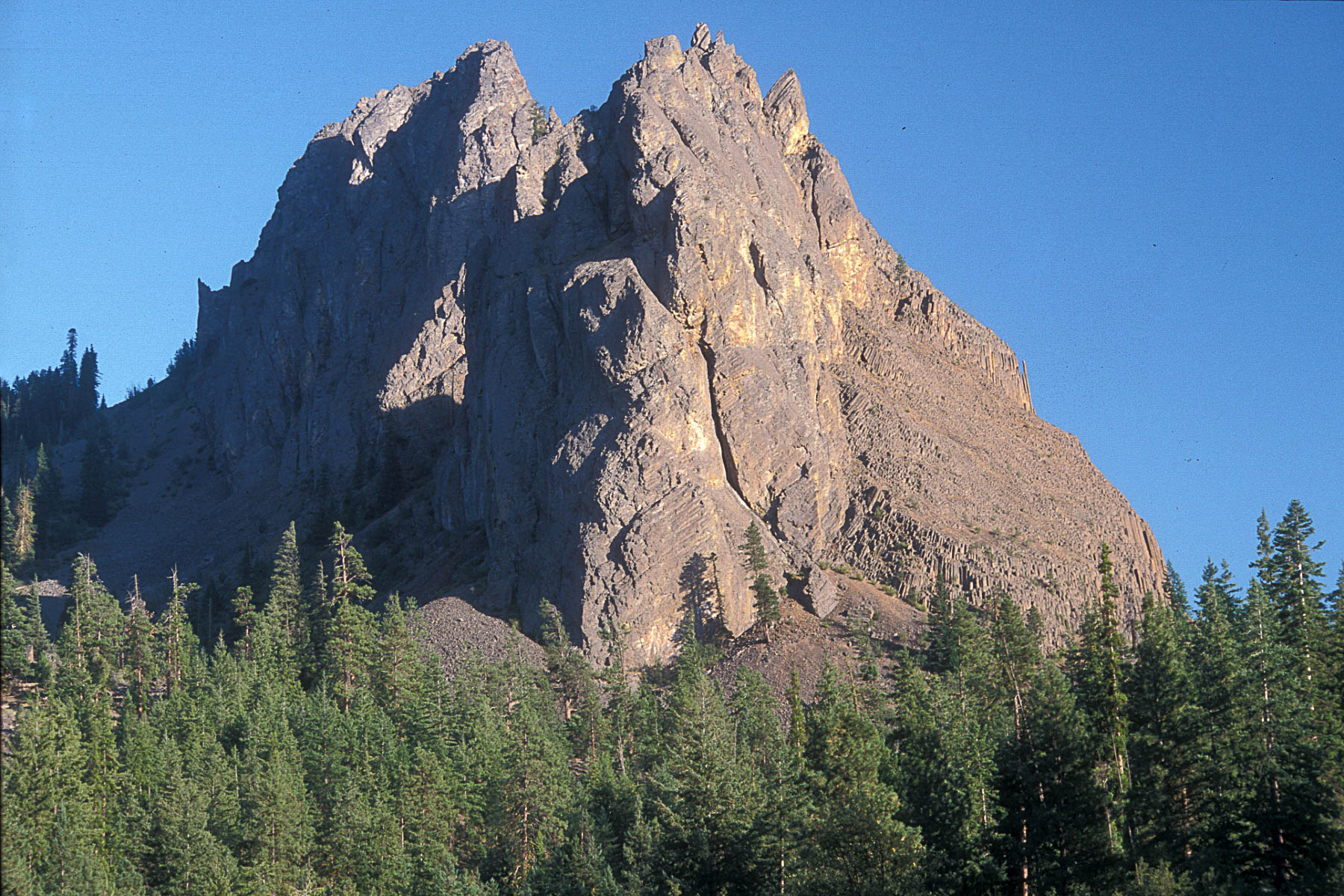
- Kloochman Rock

Highest point
- Elevation: 4,541 ft (1,384 m)
- Prominence: 492 ft (150 m)
- Isolation: 1.5 mi (2.4 km) to Goose Egg Mountain
- Coordinates: 46.63095°N 121.09230°W

Geography
- Location within Washington (state)
- Location: Yakima County, Washington, United States
- Topo map: Tieton Basin

Geology
- Rock age: Pliocene–Oligocene

Kloochman Rock is a rocky outcrop in the Cascade Range east of Rimrock Lake in Yakima County, Washington, United States. The edifice is oriented linearly northwest to southeast with its highest elevation near the southeastern edge and lies within the Okanogan–Wenatchee National Forest.

== Geology ==
The rock is an andesite intrusion that formed when magma pushed upward then cooled and hardened while remaining underground. Research published in the 1930s and 1940s suggested the andesite may have been part of the Fifes Peaks Formation which includes lava flows erupted by an extinct volcano to the northeast. This relationship was removed in later geologic maps of the region and are now believed to be separate geologic units.

It is estimated to have formed between the Oligocene and Pliocene epochs. This time period coincides with the growth of the Cascade Mountains, a volcanic arc formed by the subduction of the Juan de Fuca Plate under the North American Plate but is not listed as a volcanic vent in geological maps produced by the Washington State Department of Natural Resources. It predates modern Cascade volcanoes like Mount Rainier to the west. After cooling, the surrounding material eroded at a faster rate leaving behind the formation seen today. It is surrounded by dense forest.

== History ==
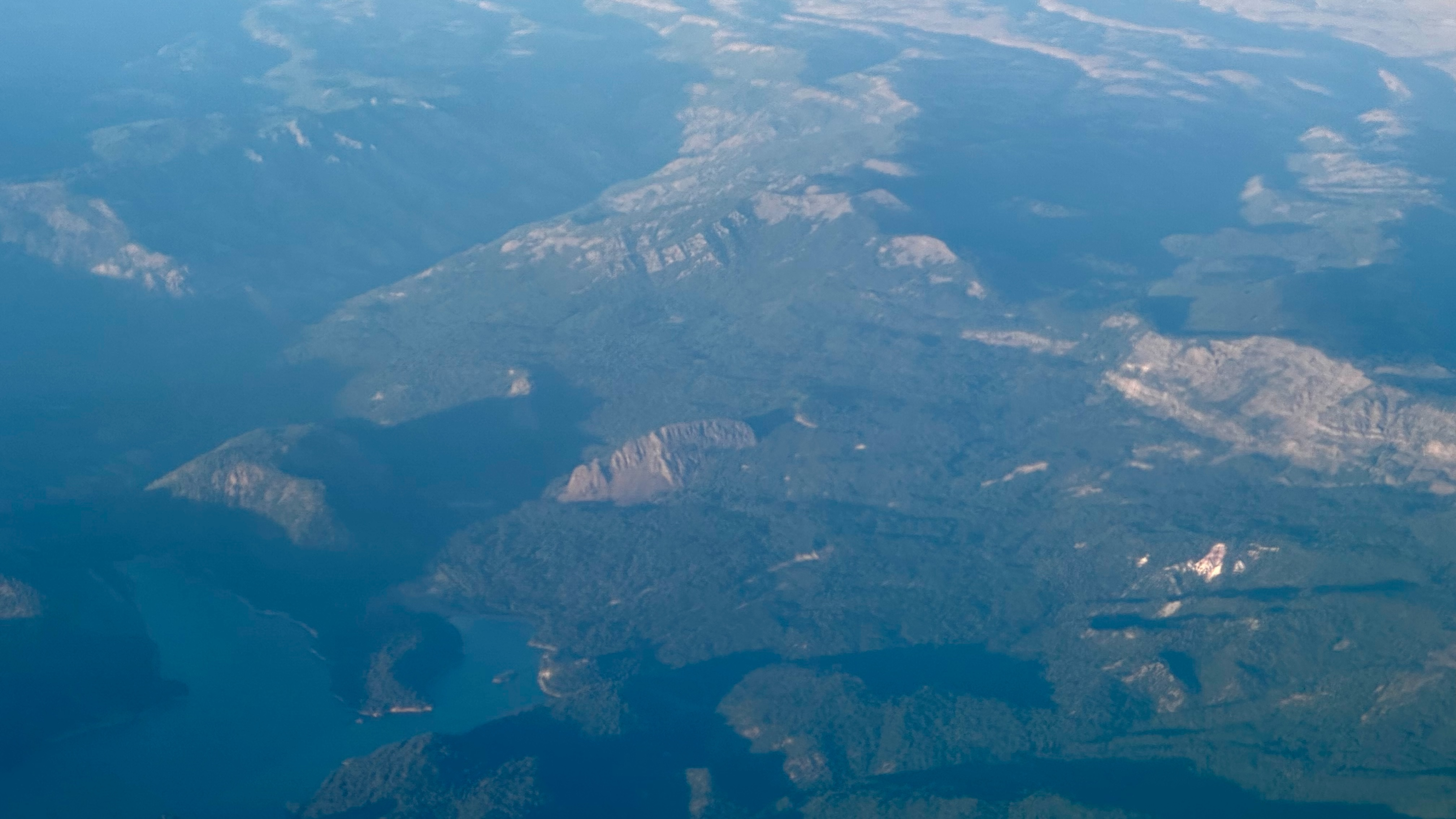
Kloochman Rock and the surrounding area seen from an airplane. Rimrock Lake is visible in the bottom left corner.

Kloochman is a Chinook Jargon term meaning woman or wife and stems from a Yakama legend telling of a respected chief, Me-ow-wah, who had no desire to have a wife. Despite this, according to the legend, nearby chiefs sent princesses leading Me-ow-wah to leave his village for the mountains. When his people found him, the chief consulted with his father and made a sacrifice of himself and the potential brides. Legend holds that Me-ow-wah became Goose Egg Mountain 1.5 mi (2.4 km) to the north while one of the women became Kloochman Rock.

The Yakama-Cowlitz Trail used by the Yakama and Cowlitz peoples to cross the Cascades passed near the north side of Kloochman Rock. There is evidence that this route was used as early as 9,200 years ago making it one of the oldest known cross-Cascade trails. The Naxchiish-lama band of the Yakama had summer villages in the region.

William O. Douglas, who would later become a U.S. Supreme Court Justice, climbed the rock in 1913 at one point reportedly dangling 200 ft (61 m) in the air. This and other experiences in the Tieton River watershed played a role in his political views. Rock climbers continue to use the rock but the top can be reached by scramble.
