= Haleets =

Boulder on Bainbridge Island, Washington

- Glacial erratic rock
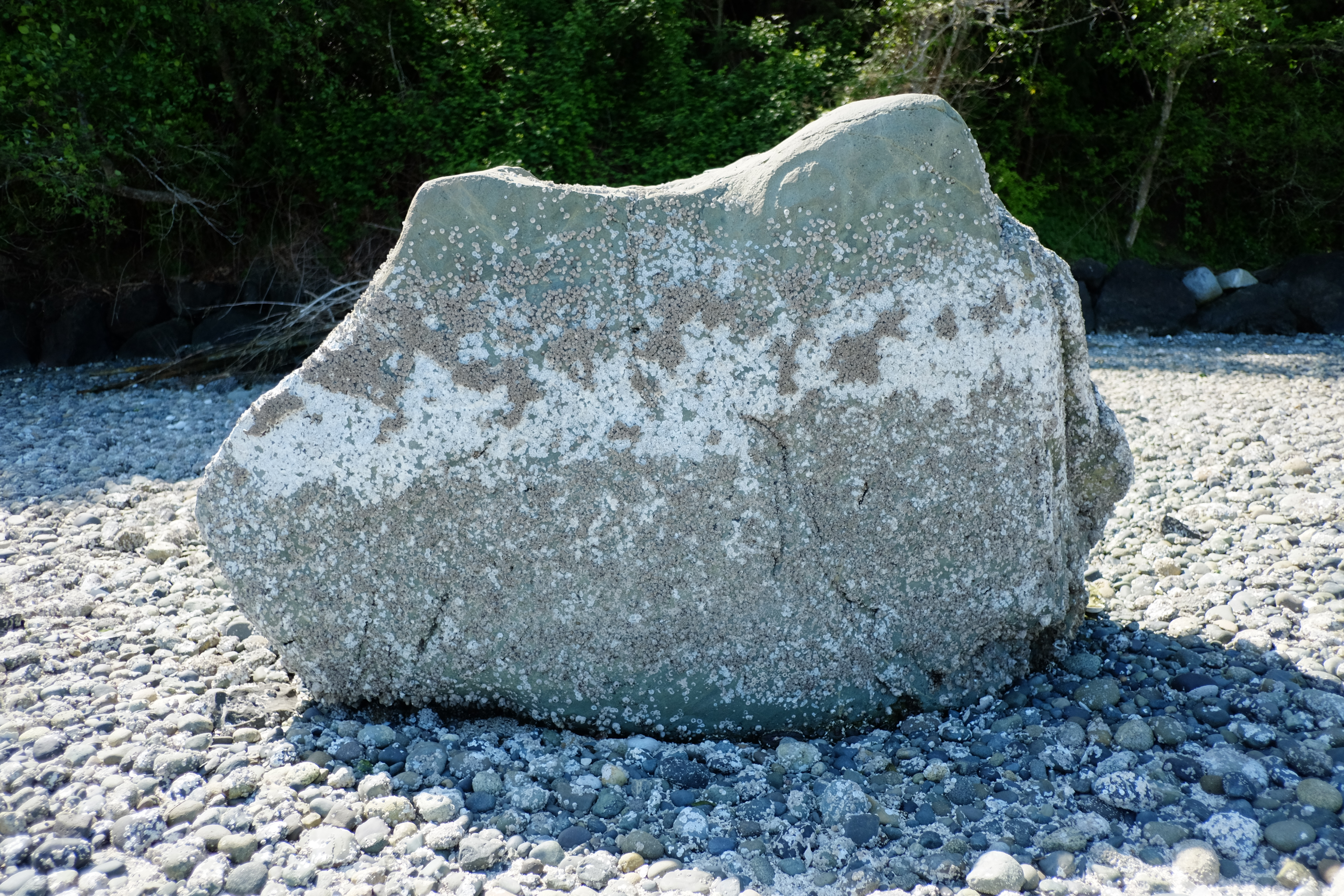
- Haleets at low tide. Most of the petroglyphs are concealed beneath barnacles.
- Coordinates: 47°43′07.1″N 122°32′40.1″W

Composition
- Sandstone

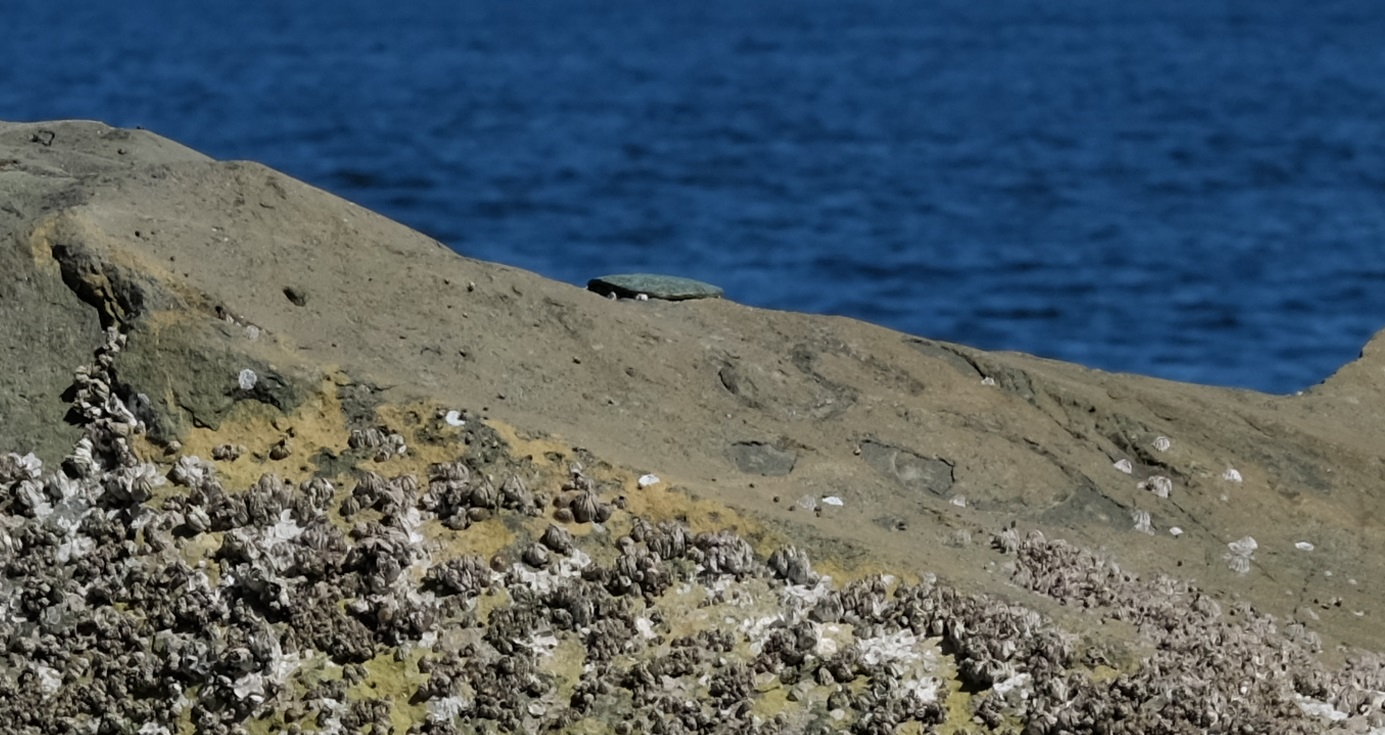
Closeup showing 19th century survey marks on Haleets Rock. The letters "C S" (Coast Survey) can be seen nearly inverted.

Haleets (Lushootseed: x̌alilc also called Figurehead Rock) is a sandstone glacial erratic boulder with inscribed petroglyphs on Bainbridge Island, Washington. The Native American Suquamish Tribe claims the rock, at Agate Point on the shore of Agate Passage, as part of their heritage.

== Date and purpose of petroglyphs ==
The exact date the petroglyphs were carved is unknown but is estimated to be around 1000 BCE to 400 or 500 CE, the latest date being when labrets (worn by one of the petroglyph figures) were no longer used by Coast Salish peoples.

Haleets, also spelled as Halelos, Xalelos and Xalilc, is derived from the Lushootseed name of the rock, x̌alilc, meaning "marked rock". It is also known in English as Figurehead Rock. Its purpose is unknown but the Suquamish Museum curator and archivist Charlie Sigo has stated that it may have been a boundary marker. An amateur astronomer has proposed a theory that it has a calendrical function (see Archaeoastronomy). (Note: Bainbridge Island Historical Museum 2012: "The petroglyph lies precisely west of the Skykomish canyon 60 miles away. Standing at the petroglyph on the vernal and autumnal equinox, one can view the rising sun shining straight through the canyon.")

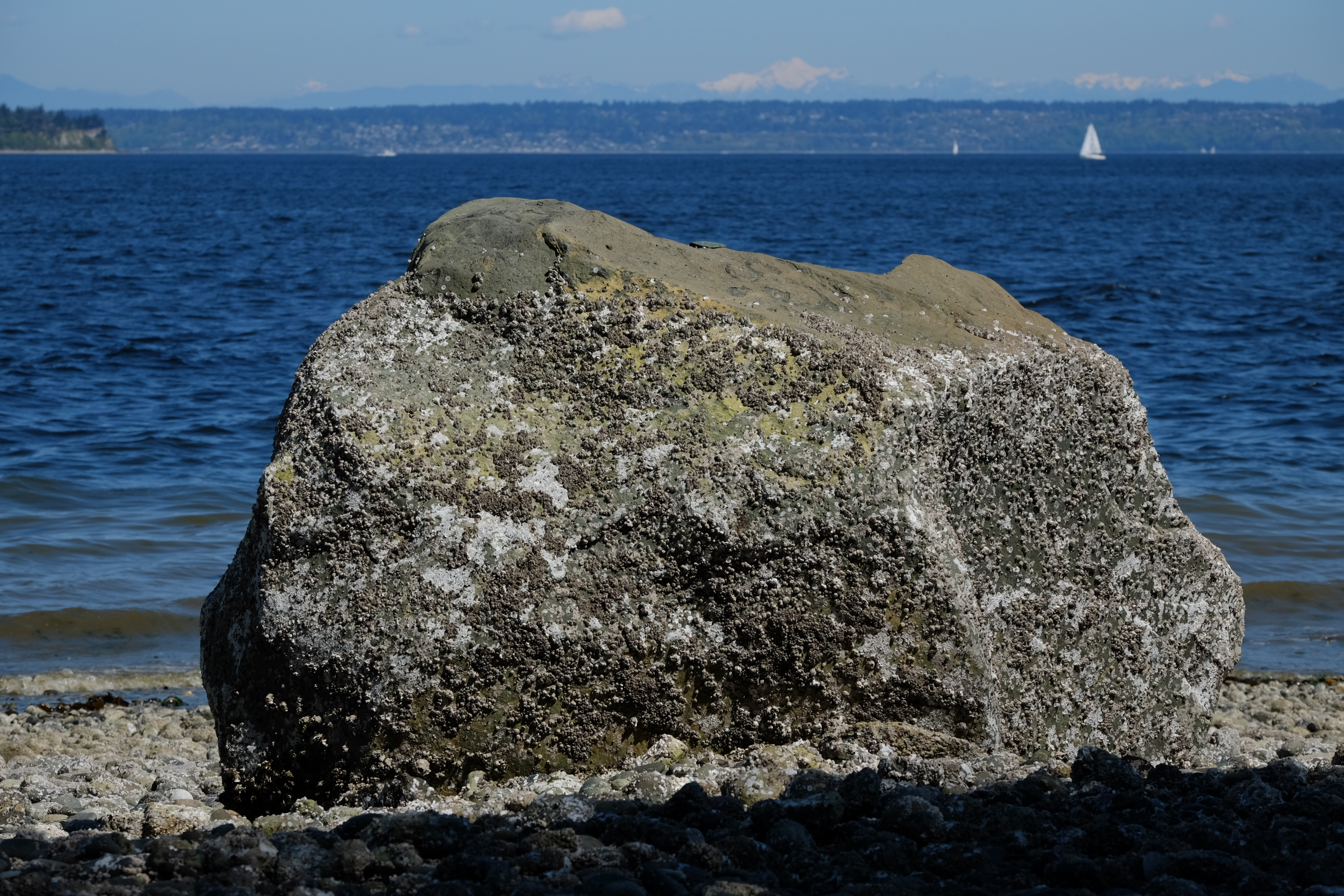
Haleets Rock, looking northwest from the beach. Petroglyphs are on the side facing the water.

== Physical description ==
The rock is 5 feet (1.5 m) tall and 7 feet (2.1 m) long. It sits about 100 feet (30 m) offshore, and has been marked with chiseled and drilled Coast Survey features since 1856, and a bronze geodetic mark was placed on it in 1934. Some sources say that the rock is one of three prominent Salish Sea petroglyphs that were always on the shoreline, but tectonic activity around the Seattle Fault may have put Haleets in the intertidal zone. (Note: Alcalá 2013: "Within human memory, Laxelks, now called Wing Point, fell about three feet during an earthquake.")

== In modern Pacific Northwest culture ==
x̌alilc (pronounced "Haleets" or "Halilts") Elementary School in the Bainbridge Island School District outside Seattle was renamed from Charles Wilkes Elementary in 2023 to honor the name of the petroglyph.

== See also ==
- List of individual rocks
