= List of rocks in Washington =

This is a list of notable rocks and petroglyphs in the U.S. state of Washington.

== Rocks ==
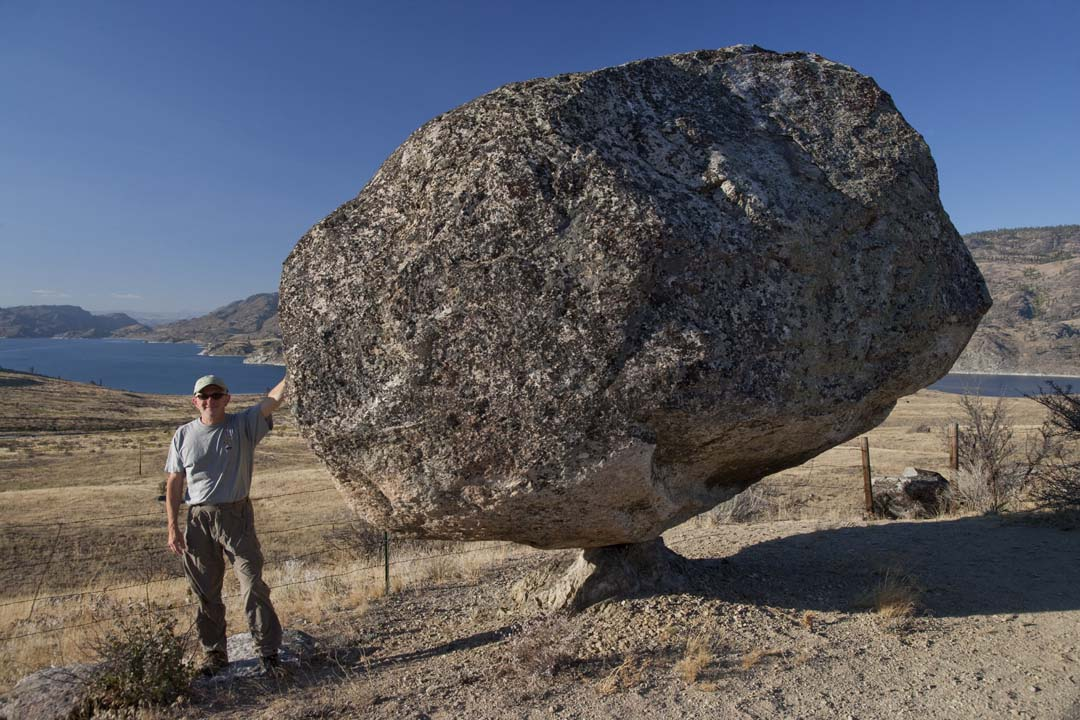
Omak Rock

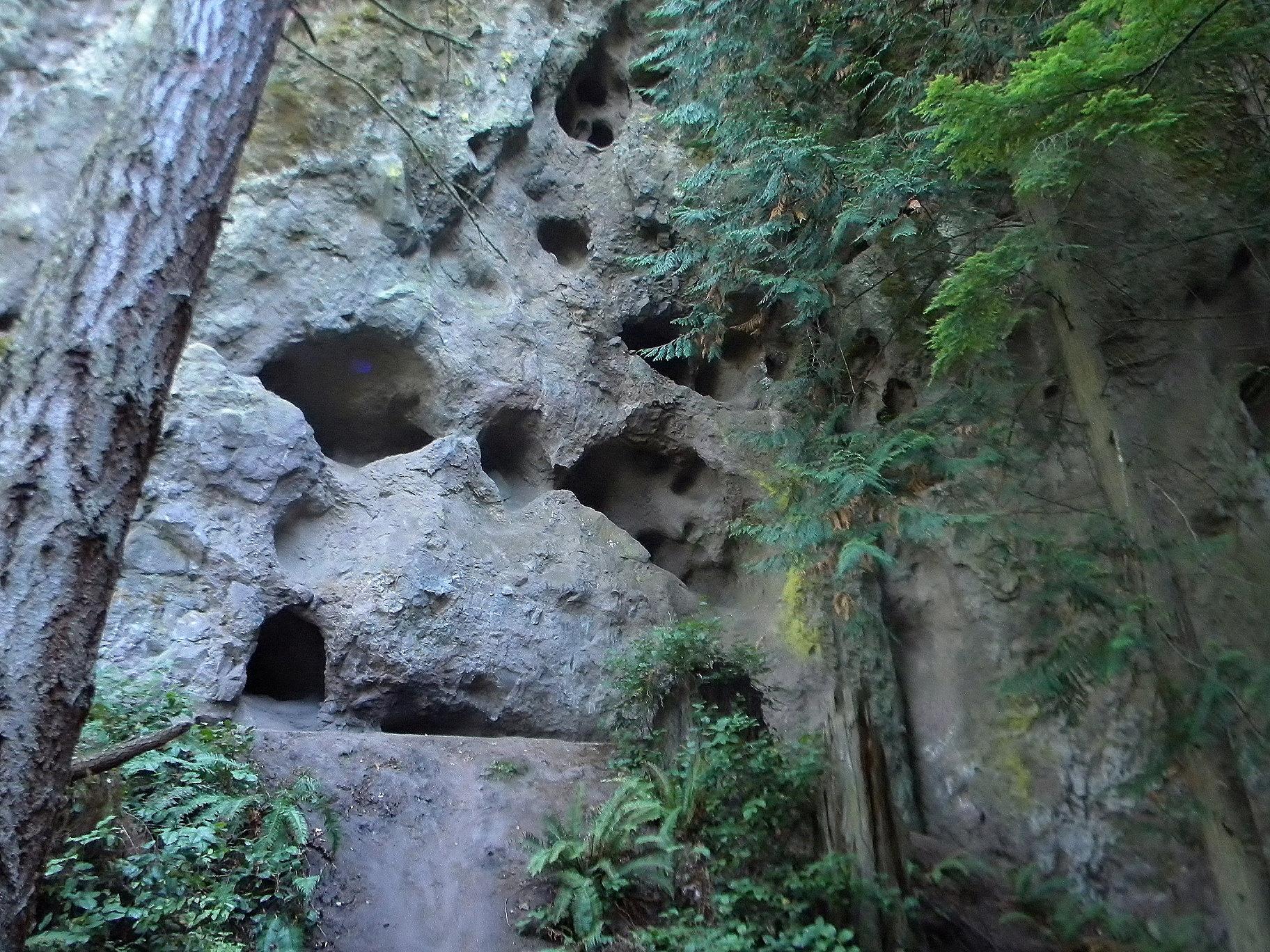
Tamanowas Rock

- Bellingham Rock
- Big Rock
- Boulder Park
- Discovery Park erratic
- Ephrata Erratic Fan
- Fantastic Erratic
- Four Mile Rock
- Frog Rock
- Haleets
- Lake Condon erratics
- Lake Lawrence erratic
- Lake Stevens Monster
- Leschi Park erratic
- Lone Rock (Lone Rock, Washington)
- Monster Rock
- Omak Rock
- Ravenna Park erratic
- Skystone
- Tamanowas Rock
- Thornton Creek erratic
- Wedgwood Rock
- Yeager Rock

=== Buttes and steptoes ===
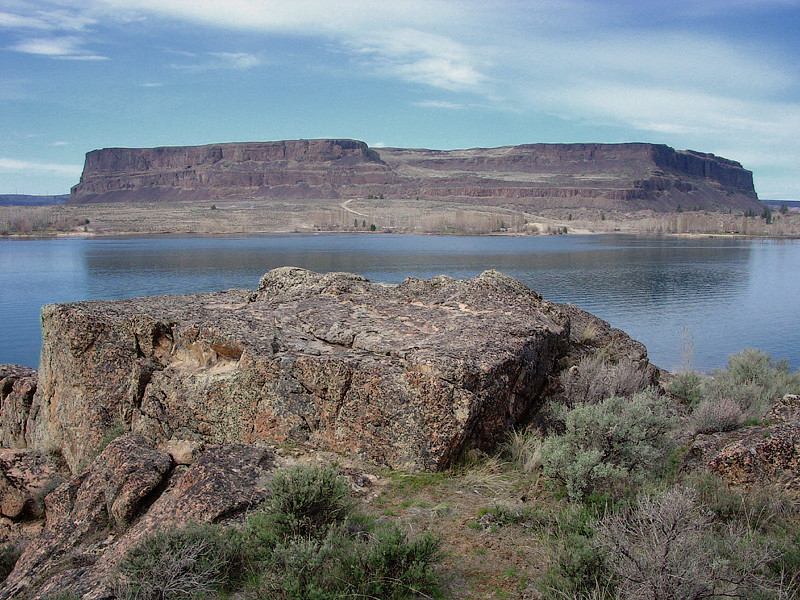
Steamboat Rock

- Kamiak Butte
- Steamboat Rock
- Steptoe Butte

== Petroglyphs ==
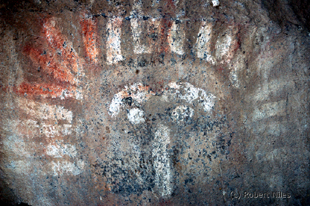
Image on Yakima Indian Painted Rocks

- Duwamish Head petroglyphs
- Elliot Bay Petroglyphs
- Ginkgo Petrified Forest State Park petroglyphs
- Haleets
- Lake Lenore Caves State Park
- Yakima Indian Painted Rocks

== See also ==
- Geology of Washington
- Glacial erratic boulders of the Puget Sound region
- List of individual rocks
