= National Register of Historic Places listings in Jefferson County, Washington =

Location of Jefferson County in Washington

This list presents the full set of buildings, structures, objects, sites, or districts designated on the National Register of Historic Places in Jefferson County, Washington, and offers brief descriptive information about each of them. The National Register recognizes places of national, state, or local historic significance across the United States. Out of over 90,000 National Register sites nationwide, Washington is home to approximately 1,500, and 80 of those are found partially or wholly in Jefferson County.

This National Park Service list is complete through NPS recent listings posted October 30, 2026.

== Current listings ==
	Name on the Register	Image	Date listed	Location	City or town	Description
1	Adventuress	Adventuress	April 11, 1989 (#89001067)	Sound Experience, PO Box 1390; 47°38′06″N 122°19′39″W	Port Townsend	
2	Frank Bartlett House	Frank Bartlett House	April 24, 1973 (#73001870)	314 Polk St. 48°06′54″N 122°45′27″W	Port Townsend	
3	Henry Bash House	Henry Bash House	May 16, 1985 (#85001099)	718 F St. 48°07′17″N 122°46′09″W	Port Townsend	
4	Senator William Bishop House and Office	Senator William Bishop House and Office	October 10, 1984 (#84000099)	Chimacum-Center Rd. 48°00′39″N 122°46′05″W	Chimacum	
5	Botten Cabin	Botten Cabin	July 13, 2007 (#07000729)	20.9 miles (33.6 km) from Whiskey Bend Trailhead on the Elwha River Trail; 47°45′50″N 123°27′16″W	Port Angeles	
6	Chimacum Post Office	Chimacum Post Office	July 14, 1983 (#83003323)	Chimacum-Center Rd. 48°00′39″N 122°46′06″W	Chimacum	
7	Christian Congregation Church of Port Ludlow	Christian Congregation Church of Port Ludlow	January 28, 2021 (#100006061)	11 Werner Rd. 47°56′12″N 122°42′02″W	Port Ludlow	
8	City Hall	City Hall	May 14, 1971 (#71000868)	Water and Madison Sts. 48°06′58″N 122°45′07″W	Port Townsend	
9	Coleman-Furlong House	Coleman-Furlong House	May 16, 1985 (#85001100)	1253 Umatilla Ave. 48°07′29″N 122°47′22″W	Port Townsend	
10	Dodger Point Fire Lookout	Dodger Point Fire Lookout	July 13, 2007 (#07000736)	Mile 13 of Dodger Point Trail, about 17.2 miles (27.7 km) south of Port Angeles, in Olympic National Park; 47°52′27″N 123°30′36″W	Port Angeles	
11	Duckabush River Bridge	Duckabush River Bridge	July 16, 1982 (#82004219)	Spans Duckabush River; 47°41′25″N 122°53′52″W	Duckabush	Historic Bridges and Tunnels in Washington TR
12	Joel Edwards House	Joel Edwards House	May 16, 1985 (#85001101)	913 25th St. 48°07′05″N 122°47′09″W	Port Townsend	
13	Elk Lick Lodge		July 13, 2007 (#07000734)	13 miles (21 km) from Whiskey Bend Trailhead on the Elwha River Trail; 47°51′26″N 123°28′09″W	Port Angeles	
14	Enchanted Valley Chalet	Enchanted Valley Chalet	July 13, 2007 (#07000737)	13 miles (21 km) upriver from Graves Cr. Trailhead; 47°40′31″N 123°23′21″W	Port Angeles	
15	Thomas Fitzgerald House	Thomas Fitzgerald House	May 16, 1985 (#85001102)	832 T St. 48°07′50″N 122°45′49″W	Port Townsend	
16	Fort Flagler	Fort Flagler	May 3, 1976 (#76001882)	Southeast of Port Townsend on Marrowstone Island; 48°05′48″N 122°40′25″W	Port Townsend	Now a Washington State Park.
17	Fort Worden	Fort Worden	March 15, 1974 (#74001954)	Cherry and W Sts. 48°08′20″N 122°45′58″W	Port Townsend	Also a Washington State Park.
18	Capt. Enoch S. Fowler House	Capt. Enoch S. Fowler House	September 29, 1970 (#70000635)	Corner of Polk and Washington Sts. 48°06′50″N 122°45′35″W	Port Townsend	Is on the Washington Trust for Historic Preservation's Most Endangered Historic Properties List.
19	Gagen-Sherlock House	Gagen-Sherlock House	March 19, 1982 (#82004220)	1906 Cherry St. 48°07′47″N 122°46′05″W	Port Townsend	
20	Galster House	Galster House	July 14, 1983 (#83003325)	Water St. 48°02′01″N 122°45′10″W	Lower Hadlock	
21	Graves Creek Ranger Station	Graves Creek Ranger Station	July 13, 2007 (#07000717)	Approximately 22 miles (35 km) northeast of WA 101 on Quinault River Rd. 47°34′09″N 123°34′40″W	Port Angeles	
22	J. W. Griffiths House	J. W. Griffiths House	May 16, 1985 (#85001103)	2030 Monroe St. 48°07′34″N 122°45′43″W	Port Townsend	
23	Hamilton-Worthington House	Hamilton-Worthington House	October 8, 2014 (#14000849)	101 E. Columbia St. 47°49′40″N 122°52′33″W	Quilcene	
24	Happy Four Shelter	Happy Four Shelter	July 13, 2007 (#07000719)	Approximately 5.4 along Hoh River Trail; 47°52′06″N 123°49′41″W	Port Angeles	
25	F. C. Harper House	F. C. Harper House	May 16, 1985 (#85001104)	502 Reed St. 48°07′34″N 122°45′45″W	Port Townsend	
26	Hayes River Fire Cache		July 13, 2007 (#07000738)	Approximately 16.8 miles (27.0 km) up the Elwha River Trail; 47°48′34″N 123°27′09″W	Port Angeles	
27	House at 1723 Holcomb Street	House at 1723 Holcomb Street	May 16, 1985 (#85001105)	1723 Holcomb St. 48°06′46″N 122°47′07″W	Port Townsend	
28	House at 30 Tremont Street	House at 30 Tremont Street	May 16, 1985 (#85001106)	30 Tremont St. 48°07′34″N 122°46′25″W	Port Townsend	Renumbered to 1070 Tremont St.
29	House at 503 Fir Street	House at 503 Fir Street	May 16, 1985 (#85001107)	503 Fir St. 48°07′10″N 122°46′10″W	Port Townsend	
30	Interrorem Guard Station — Olympic National Forest	Interrorem Guard Station — Olympic National Forest	July 17, 2013 (#13000506)	Duckabush Road; 47°40′43″N 122°59′34″W	Duckabush vicinity	
31	Irondale Historic District	Irondale Historic District	July 14, 1983 (#83003326)	Port Townsend Bay and Admirally Inlet; 48°02′33″N 122°45′58″W	Port Townsend	
32	Irondale Jail	Irondale Jail	July 14, 1983 (#83003327)	Moore St. 48°02′42″N 122°46′04″W	Irondale	
33	Francis Wilcox James House	Francis Wilcox James House	September 29, 1970 (#70000636)	Corner of Washington and Harrison Sts. 48°06′49″N 122°45′40″W	Port Townsend	
34	Jefferson County Courthouse	Jefferson County Courthouse	April 24, 1973 (#73001871)	Jefferson and Case Sts. 48°06′44″N 122°46′03″W	Port Townsend	
35	Johnson House	Johnson House	July 14, 1983 (#83003328)	7082 Flagler Rd; 48°02′58″N 122°41′17″W	Nordland	Old address: 287 Flagler Rd.; Picture is wrong house.
36	Kuhn Spit Archeological Site	Kuhn Spit Archeological Site	December 22, 1978 (#78002747)	Address restricted	Chimacum	
37	Lake-Little House	Lake-Little House	May 16, 1985 (#85001108)	1607 Sheridan St. 48°06′43″N 122°47′23″W	Port Townsend	
38	Colonel Henry Landes House	Colonel Henry Landes House	June 28, 2021 (#100006702)	1034 Franklin St. 48°06′57″N 122°45′37″W	Port Townsend	
39	J. N. Laubach House	J. N. Laubach House	May 16, 1985 (#85001109)	613 F St. 48°07′14″N 122°46′05″W	Port Townsend	
40	Leader Building	Leader Building	September 29, 1970 (#70000637)	226 Adams St. 48°06′55″N 122°45′15″W	Port Townsend	Also known as the Fowler Building.
41	Lincoln School	Lincoln School	September 8, 2017 (#100001596)	450 Fir St. 48°07′08″N 122°46′09″W	Port Townsend	
42	Manresa Hall	Manresa Hall	September 29, 1970 (#70000638)	Sheridan St. 48°06′17″N 122°47′20″W	Port Townsend	Also known as Eisenbeis Castle and Manresa Inn.
43	Methodist Episcopal Church of Port Hadlock	Methodist Episcopal Church of Port Hadlock	July 14, 1983 (#83003329)	Randolph and Curtiss Sts. 48°02′03″N 122°46′09″W	Hadlock	
44	O. L. and Josephine Morgan House	O. L. and Josephine Morgan House	May 16, 1985 (#85001110)	1033 Pierce St. 48°07′03″N 122°46′00″W	Port Townsend	
45	Nelson House	Nelson House	October 10, 1984 (#84000101)	Freeman Rd. 48°02′06″N 122°41′34″W	Nordland	
46	North Fork Quinault Ranger Station	North Fork Quinault Ranger Station	July 13, 2007 (#07000718)	Approximately 18 miles (29 km) northeast of WA 101 on N. Fork Rd. off N. Shore Quinault Rd. 47°34′26″N 123°38′50″W	Port Angeles	
47	Earl Oatman House	Earl Oatman House	July 14, 1983 (#83003330)	Muncie St. 47°49′04″N 122°52′27″W	Quilcene	
48	Old German Consulate	Old German Consulate	February 24, 1971 (#71000869)	313 Walker St. 48°06′39″N 122°46′03″W	Port Townsend	
49	Olympus Guard Station		November 5, 2007 (#07000722)	Approximately 9 miles (14 km) from Hoh River Trailhead at Hoh Ranger Station; 47°52′35″N 123°45′52″W	Port Angeles	
50	Pearson House	Pearson House	May 16, 1985 (#85001111)	1275 27th St. 48°07′09″N 122°47′30″W	Port Townsend	Renumbered from 1939 27th St.
51	Pelton Creek Shelter		July 13, 2007 (#07000727)	Approximately 15.5 miles (24.9 km) up the Queets River Trail; 47°42′09″N 123°45′48″W	Port Angeles	
52	H. S. Petersen House	H. S. Petersen House	May 16, 1985 (#85001112)	50th and Kuhn St. 48°08′10″N 122°46′49″W	Port Townsend	
53	Benjamin S. Pettygrove House	Benjamin S. Pettygrove House	September 25, 1985 (#85002662)	1000 G St. 48°07′20″N 122°46′19″W	Port Townsend	Also known as the Pettygrove House.
54	Point Wilson Lighthouse	Point Wilson Lighthouse	March 24, 1971 (#71000870)	On a point of land between Juan de Fuca Strait and Admiralty Inlet; 48°08′39″N 122°45′14″W	Port Townsend	
55	Port Townsend Carnegie Library	Port Townsend Carnegie Library	August 3, 1982 (#82004908)	1220 Lawrence; 48°07′00″N 122°45′44″W	Port Townsend	Carnegie Libraries of Washington TR
56	Port Townsend Historic District	Port Townsend Historic District	May 17, 1976 (#76001883)	Roughly bounded by Scott, Blaine, Walker, and Taft Sts., and the Waterfront; 48°07′01″N 122°45′39″W	Port Townsend	
57	Quilcene-Quinault Battleground Site		December 29, 1978 (#78002748)	Address restricted	Quilcene	
58	Quilcene Ranger Station	Quilcene Ranger Station	March 27, 2012 (#12000162)	61 Herbert St. 47°49′23″N 122°52′37″W	Quilcene	
59	Judge Ralston House	Judge Ralston House	May 16, 1985 (#85001113)	1523 Madison St. 48°07′27″N 122°45′43″W	Port Townsend	
60	Rothschild House	Rothschild House	September 29, 1970 (#70000639)	Taylor and Franklin Sts. 48°06′58″N 122°45′23″W	Port Townsend	Built in 1868, this is Port Townsend's oldest house.
61	Hanna Rover House	Hanna Rover House	July 14, 1983 (#83003331)	Chimacum-Center Rd. 47°58′23″N 122°46′11″W	Center	
62	Saint's Rest, Tukey's Pioneer Cabin and Homestead House	Saint's Rest, Tukey's Pioneer Cabin and Homestead House	July 14, 1983 (#83003332)	Chevy Chase Rd. 48°03′11″N 122°50′34″W	Port Townsend	
63	James C. Saunders House	James C. Saunders House	October 18, 1977 (#77001335)	Sims Way; 48°06′13″N 122°47′11″W	Port Townsend	
64	Ferdinand Schlager House	Ferdinand Schlager House	May 16, 1985 (#85001114)	810 Rose St. 48°07′20″N 122°46′09″W	Port Townsend	
65	Seal Rock Shell Mounds (45JE15)	Seal Rock Shell Mounds (45JE15)	June 12, 1985 (#85001247)	Address restricted	Brinnon	
66	Capt. Peter Shibles House	Capt. Peter Shibles House	July 14, 1983 (#83003333)	Curtiss St. 48°02′04″N 122°46′01″W	Hadlock	
67	Tollef Sole House	Tollef Sole House	July 14, 1983 (#83003334)	275 Flagler Rd. 48°02′55″N 122°41′29″W	Nordland	
68	St. Paul's Episcopal Church	St. Paul's Episcopal Church	September 29, 1970 (#70000640)	Corner of Jefferson and Tyler Sts. 48°06′56″N 122°45′28″W	Port Townsend	
69	Starrett House	Starrett House	September 29, 1970 (#70000641)	744 Clay St. 48°07′05″N 122°45′25″W	Port Townsend	
70	Andrew Stegerwald House	Andrew Stegerwald House	May 16, 1985 (#85001115)	1710 Fir St. 48°07′40″N 122°46′00″W	Port Townsend	
71	Hans Swanson House	Hans Swanson House	July 14, 1983 (#83003335)	Swansonville Rd. 47°56′20″N 122°42′15″W	Port Ludlow	
72	Tamanowas Rock	Tamanowas Rock	August 3, 2015 (#15000498)	Address restricted	Chimacum vicinity	
73	John Trumbull House	John Trumbull House	May 16, 1985 (#85001116)	925 Wilson St. 48°06′26″N 122°47′15″W	Port Townsend	
74	Horace Tucker House	Horace Tucker House	January 18, 1973 (#73001872)	706 Franklin St. 48°07′03″N 122°45′20″W	Port Townsend	
75	Uncas School	Uncas School	February 5, 1987 (#87000025)	E. Uncas Rd. 47°59′01″N 122°53′00″W	Discovery Bay	
76	U.S. Post Office – Port Townsend Main	U.S. Post Office – Port Townsend Main	May 30, 1991 (#91000652)	1322 Washington; 48°06′48″N 122°45′43″W	Port Townsend	
77	Van Trojen House	Van Trojen House	October 10, 1984 (#84000100)	Van Trojen Rd. 47°59′43″N 122°48′38″W	Chimacum	
78	Milo P. Ward House	Milo P. Ward House	May 16, 1985 (#85001117)	1707 Jackson St. 48°07′33″N 122°45′40″W	Port Townsend	
79	F/V Western Flyer (purse seiner)	F/V Western Flyer (purse seiner)	May 8, 2017 (#100000990)	919 Haines Pl. 48°06′24″N 122°46′52″W	Port Townsend	
80	Hattie Williams House	Hattie Williams House	July 14, 1983 (#83003336)	Moore St. 48°02′40″N 122°46′33″W	Irondale	

== Former listings ==
	Name on the Register	Image	Date listed	Date removed	Location	City or town	Description
1	Chow Chow Bridge	Chow Chow Bridge	July 16, 1982 (#82004218)	April 25, 1988	Spans Quinault River	Taholah	

== See also ==
- National Register of Historic Places listings in Washington state
- Listings in neighboring counties: Clallam, Grays Harbor, Island, Kitsap, Mason
- List of National Historic Landmarks in Washington (state)
- Historic preservation
- History of Washington (state)
- Index of Washington (state)-related articles
