= Glacial erratic boulders of the Puget Sound region =

Many glacial erratic boulders (often simply called glacial erratics) can be found in the Puget Sound region as far south as the Yelm area where the Puget Lobe of the glacier reached its maximum extent.

The Pleistocene ice age glaciation of Puget Sound created many of the geographical features of the region, including Puget Sound itself, and the erratics are one of the remnants of that age. According to Nick Zentner of Central Washington University Department of Geological Sciences, "Canadian rocks [are] strewn all over the Puget lowland, stretching from the Olympic Peninsula clear over to the Cascade Range." Erratics can be found at altitudes up to about 1,300–1,600 feet (400–490 m) in the Enumclaw area, along with kames, drumlins, and perhaps also the unique Mima mounds. The soil of Seattle, the state's largest city, is approximately 80% glacial drift, most of which is Vashon glacial deposits (till), and nearly all of the city's major named hills are characterized as drumlins (Beacon Hill, First Hill, Capitol Hill, Queen Anne Hill) or drift uplands (Magnolia, West Seattle). Boulders greater than 3 meters in diameter are "rare" in the Vashon till, but can be found, as seen in the table below.

== List of erratics ==
A few of the larger or otherwise most notable erratics can be found in this table. More erratics are noted in the area-specific lists in the navigation box.

| Name and description | Height | County | Image |
|---|---|---|---|
| Airport Boulder, at Martha Lake Airport Park in Martha Lake, said to be "one of the largest glacial erratic boulders in urban King, Snohomish, and Pierce counties", is approximately 20 feet (6.1 m) long on its longest axis and about twice a man's height. The erratic is composed of greenstone, and has long been used for bouldering (rock climbing), with at least four ascent routes. 47°51′53.7″N 122°14′10.7″W | 12 feet (3.7 m) | Snohomish | |
| Arroyo Park erratic, in Arroyo Park in Bellingham, is approximately 10 feet (3.0 m) tall and 17 by 23 feet (5.2 m × 7.0 m) in extent. It is mostly diorite with granodiorite dikes. 48.6983°N 122.4793°W | 10 feet (3.0 m) | Whatcom | |
| Big Rock is an 8-foot (2.4 m) tall glacial erratic in the city of Duvall. A Duvall road, a park, and several businesses are named after it. The rock, and two non-native sequoias adjacent to it probably planted by area pioneers, are a local landmark. The erratic lies in what is said to be the smallest King County park, 20 by 70 feet (6.1 m × 21.3 m) in extent, that barely contains the rock and sequoias. The two lanes of Big Rock Road used to split into a wye around the rock, until a shopping center was built nearby in the 1990s. 47°43.542′N 121°59.189′W | 8 feet (2.4 m) | King | |
| Big Rock, once known as the Rock of Ages, a greenstone erratic and a landmark on Main Street in Coupeville, at one time considered for a city conservation easement 48°12′38″N 122°41′14″W | 30 feet (9.1 m) | Island | |
| Dabob Bay erratic, a non metamorphosed conglomerate erratic on the shore of Dabob Bay, possibly part of Chuckanut Formation from Whatcom County 80 miles (130 km) away. 47.8°N 122.8°W | | Jefferson | |
| Discovery Park beach erratics Four or more erratics on beach below Discovery Park. Largest is 15.33 feet (4.67 m) high, 69.5 feet (21.2 m) in circumference. 47°40.124′N 122°25.210′W | 15.33 feet (4.67 m) | King | |
| Fort Townsend State Park erratics are two erratics in Fort Townsend State Park. One is granite, probably from the British Columbia Coast Range; the other basaltic and either from B.C. or from the Olympic Peninsula. 48°04′24″N 122°47′22″W | | Jefferson | |
| Four Mile Rock (also Fourmile Rock) is a round granite erratic, approximately 20 feet (6.1 m) across, in the intertidal zone below Seattle's Magnolia Bluff and 60 yards offshore. It has had a navigational light placed on it and appears on nautical charts. Native Americans called the rock LE'plEpL, also written La'pub, and also called it Tele'tla (meaning "rock"). A legend says that a hero named Sta'kub could throw a giant cedar and hazel branch dragnet over the rock while standing at the beach. 47°38′20″N 122°24′48″W | 15 feet (4.6 m) | King | |
| Frog Rock, a Bainbridge Island landmark 47.69612°N 122.52347°W | 7.33 feet (2.23 m) | Kitsap | |
| Lake Lawrence erratic in the Puget Sound lowlands near Lake Lawrence in Thurston County. The southernmost glacier in this list, near the limit of the Yelm lobe of the Vashon Glacier in the Rainier (city) area. 46.86507°N 122.57904°W | 15 feet (4.6 m) | Thurston | |
| Lake Stevens Monster near Lake Stevens. 34 by 78 feet (10 m × 24 m) and 210 feet (64 m) in circumference. Largest known erratic in Washington State as of 2011, and may be largest in the United States (but not North America; see the Alberta Big Rock). 47°59.816′N 122°6.954′W | 34 feet (10 m) | Snohomish | |
| Lone Rock, the namesake landmark of the unincorporated community of Lone Rock, located on the Hood Canal tidal flat about 400 feet off shore. At least 50 feet (15 m) across. 47.66297°N 122.769916°W | 50 feet (15 m) | Kitsap | |
| Oyster Bay erratic on the shore of Oyster Bay in Thurston County 47°6′15.5″N 123°4′3.0″W | 12 feet (3.7 m) | Thurston | |
| The Skystone in Bonney Lake, an andesite erratic that may have astronomical significance to the Puyallup tribe of Native Americans. It was called by an archaeastronomer "the new world Stonehenge". Height and width 4.5 by 12 feet (1.4 m × 3.7 m). 47.153807°N 122.194685°W | 4.5 feet (1.4 m) | Pierce | |
| Waterman Rock in Saratoga Woods Preserve near Langley 48°03′38″N 122°27′47″W | 38 feet (12 m) | Island | |
| Wedgwood Rock is a glacial erratic (and known to geologists as the "Wedgwood Erratic") near the neighborhood of Wedgwood in Seattle, Washington. It is 80 feet (24 m) in circumference and 19 feet (5.8 m) or 26 feet (8 m) in height. Since 1970 it has been an offense punishable by a $100 fine to climb the rock. 47.68084°N 122.2973°W | 26 feet (8 m) | King | |
| White Rock, metasandstone turned white from bird guano, in the intertidal zone at the head of Hood Canal 47°53.593′N 122°38.579′W | 24 feet (7.3 m) | Jefferson | |

== See also ==
- List of individual rocks
