= Bellingham Rock =

Former landmark in Bellingham, Washington, U.S.

Bellingham Rock Spirit Rock
- Glacial erratic rock
- Coordinates: 48.691°N 122.428°W

Bellingham Rock was a landmark 100-ton glacial erratic rock in Bellingham, Washington alongside Interstate 5, near Lake Samish and Chuckanut Creek. It has been painted as a spirit rock by Bellingham area people since 1969, resulting in inches of paint surrounding the boulder. It was scheduled for either removal "honoring the Bellingham Rock's place in community history", or demolition by Washington State Department of Transportation in 2026, as part of Puget Sound salmon recovery. The salmon recovery requires remediation of culverts under the freeway that harmed protected species. Prior to removal, the paint will be removed and soil remediation will be performed in the surrounding area due to contamination with lead and cadmium.

The rock was "quietly" broken into pieces by WSDOT c. May 5. After the rock was destroyed by the WSDOT locals felt disappointed that no real attempt to move the landmark had been considered.
