= Tamanowas =

Tamanowas is a word used by some indigenous peoples of the Pacific Northwest Coast of North America, translated to English as "spirit power". It has also been spelled t’əmanəwas, t̕əménəwəs, Tomanowos, and Tamanous. It may refer to:

- The Tamanowas Rock, a geological feature on the Olympic Peninsula
- The Willamette Meteorite, a space rock found in the Willamette Valley and known to the local indigenous people as Tamanowas
