= Spirit rock (disambiguation) =

Spirit Rock or Spirit rock may refer to:

- Prahlad Friedman, American poker player from Los Angeles, California who has played as "Spirit Rock"
- Senior rock, a rock at or near a school campus that is painted by the students of the school.
- Spirit Rock Meditation Center, Woodacre, Marin County, California
