= Port Townsend Historic District =

Historic district in Washington, United States

- U.S. National Register of Historic Places
- U.S. National Historic Landmark District
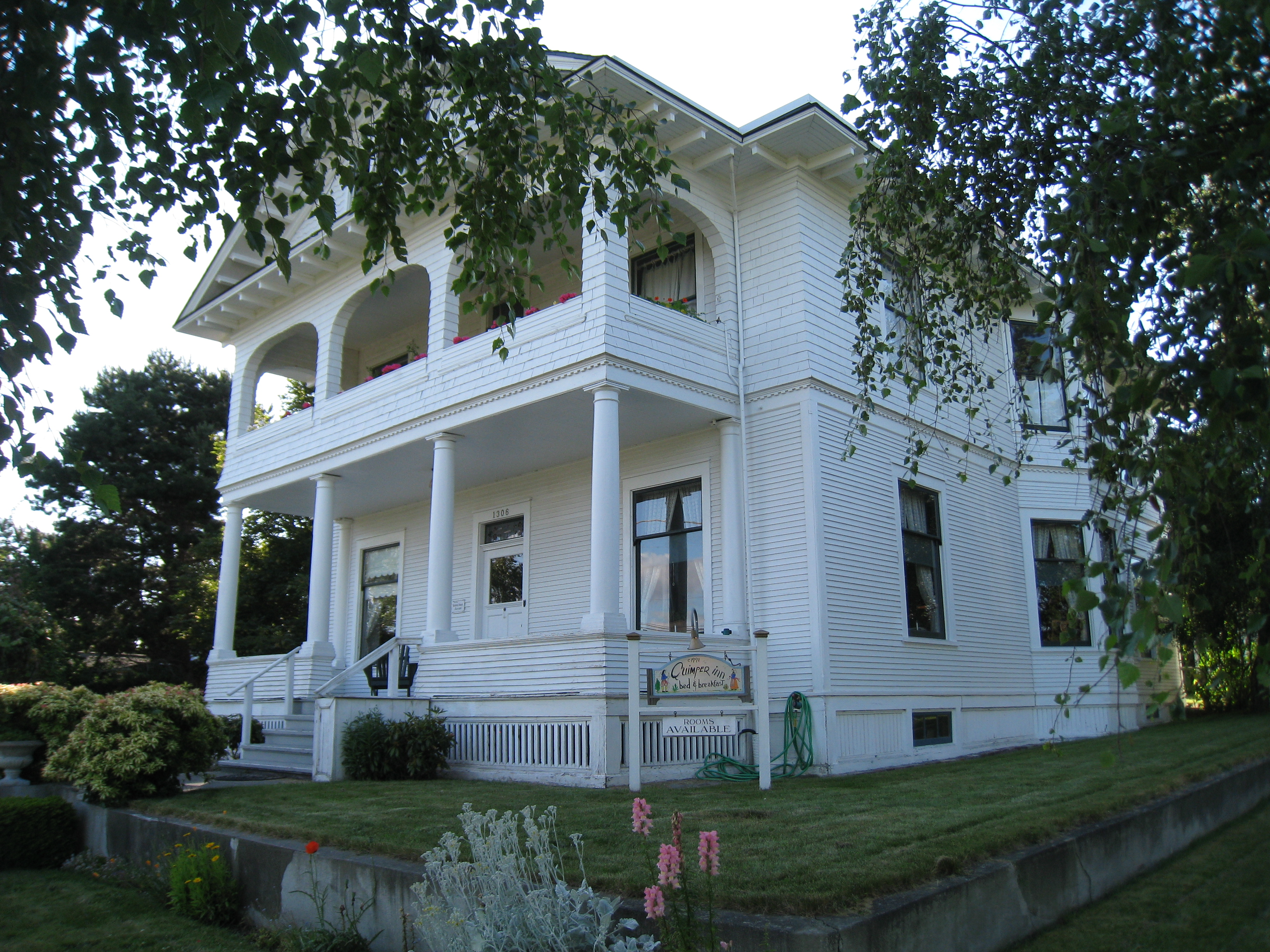
- Barthrop House, now the Quimper Inn

- Location within Washington (state)
- Location: Roughly bounded by Scott, Blaine, Walker, and Taft Sts., and the Waterfront, Port Townsend, Washington
- Area: 200 acres (0.81 km^{2})
- Built: 1858
- Architectural style: Mid 19th Century Revival, Late 19th And 20th Century Revivals, Late Victorian
- NRHP reference No.: 76001883

Significant dates
- Added to NRHP: May 17, 1976
- Designated NHLD: May 5, 1977

The Port Townsend Historic District is a National Historic Landmark District encompassing a significant portion of the waterfront and downtown area of Port Townsend, Washington. This area has many well-preserved late 19th-century buildings, owing to a building boom and crash in the 1880s. The result is one of the finest examples of a late 19th-century port town on the west coast. The historic district was listed on the National Register of Historic Places in 1976, and was designated a National Historic Landmark in 1977.

== Description and history ==
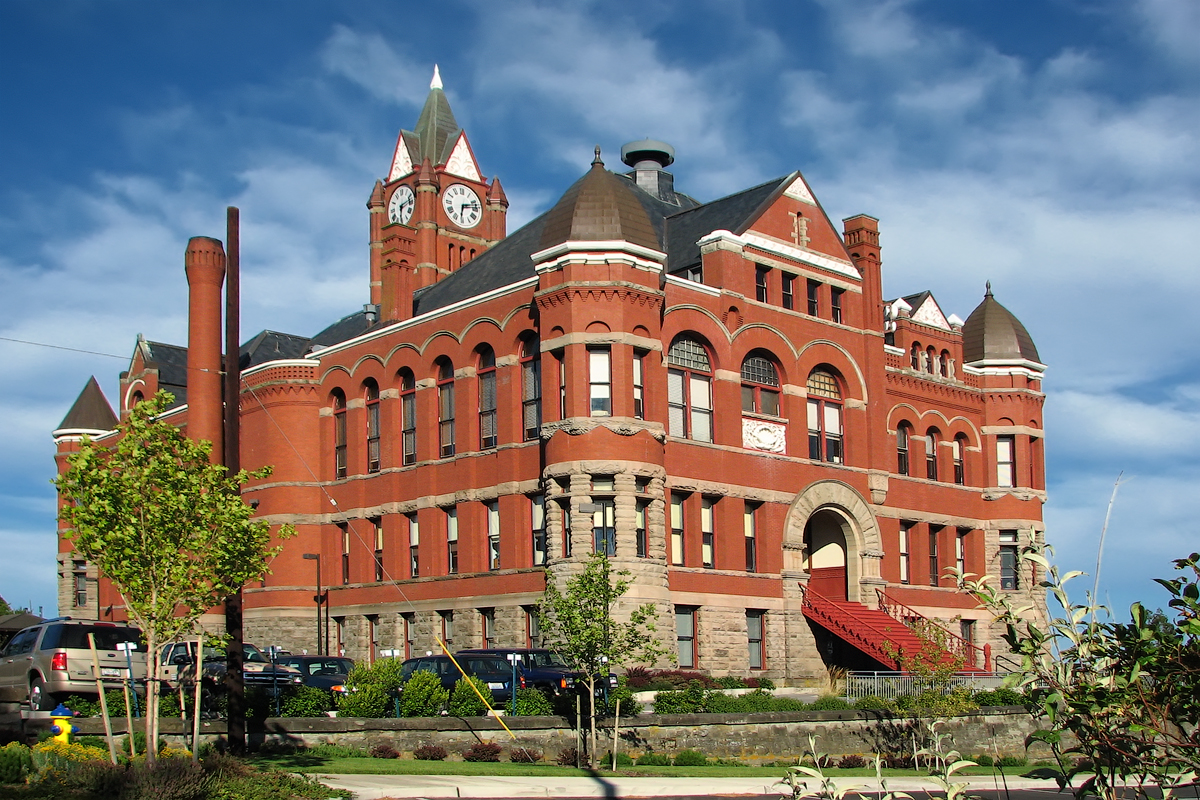
County courthouse

Port Townsend is located at the northeastern tip of Washington's Olympic Peninsula, and developed beginning about 1850 as a strategically placed well-sheltered deep-harbor port at the junction of the Strait of Juan de Fuca and the Admiralty Inlet, which provide access to Puget Sound. It grew as a major customs point, and as a shipment point for lumber taken from the peninsula's forests. The downtown area saw a major building boom beginning the late 1880s, when local businessmen developed prospects for a rail link connecting the city to Portland, Oregon. The town grew from under 1,000 residents to about 4,500 between 1880 and 1890, and is estimated to have peaked at between 7,000 and 8,000 at the height of the development boom. It is estimated that enough housing was built to support a population of 20,000, an optimistic target that the city has never reached. The building boom came to an abrupt end when the railroad endeavour was bankrupted in 1890. Although the local economy has been periodically stimulated (e.g., by the construction of Fort Worden in the early 20th century), the population quickly dwindled to about 2,000, and grew slowly over the 20th century. Because of the speed at which the economy of Port Townsend fell and the non-existence of any industry or economy to replace it, very few of the Victorian buildings were torn down or heavily renovated. They were, in essence, preserved as time capsules for the next 100 years until the value of keeping them intact was appreciated and fostered.

The historic district encompasses a roughly rectangular area about 200 acres (81 ha) in size on the southeast side of the downtown area. It is roughly bounded on the northwest by Blaine Street, and on the southwest by Scott and Walker Streets. This area includes about 700 residences and 60 commercial and civic buildings, including the city hall (1891) and the Jefferson County Courthouse, a fine Queen Anne/Romanesque structure built in 1892. The houses that populate much of the district are typically two-story frame structures, built in the Queen Anne style or one of its variants such as the Stick or Eastlake style. Commercial buildings are two to four stories in height, and are generally built out of brick with stone trim. In addition to the courthouse, there are several good commercial examples of the Richardsonian Romanesque style that became popular around that time. Three of the city's buildings are separately listed on the National Register: the Capt. Enoch S. Fowler House, the Rothschild House, and St. Paul's Episcopal Church.

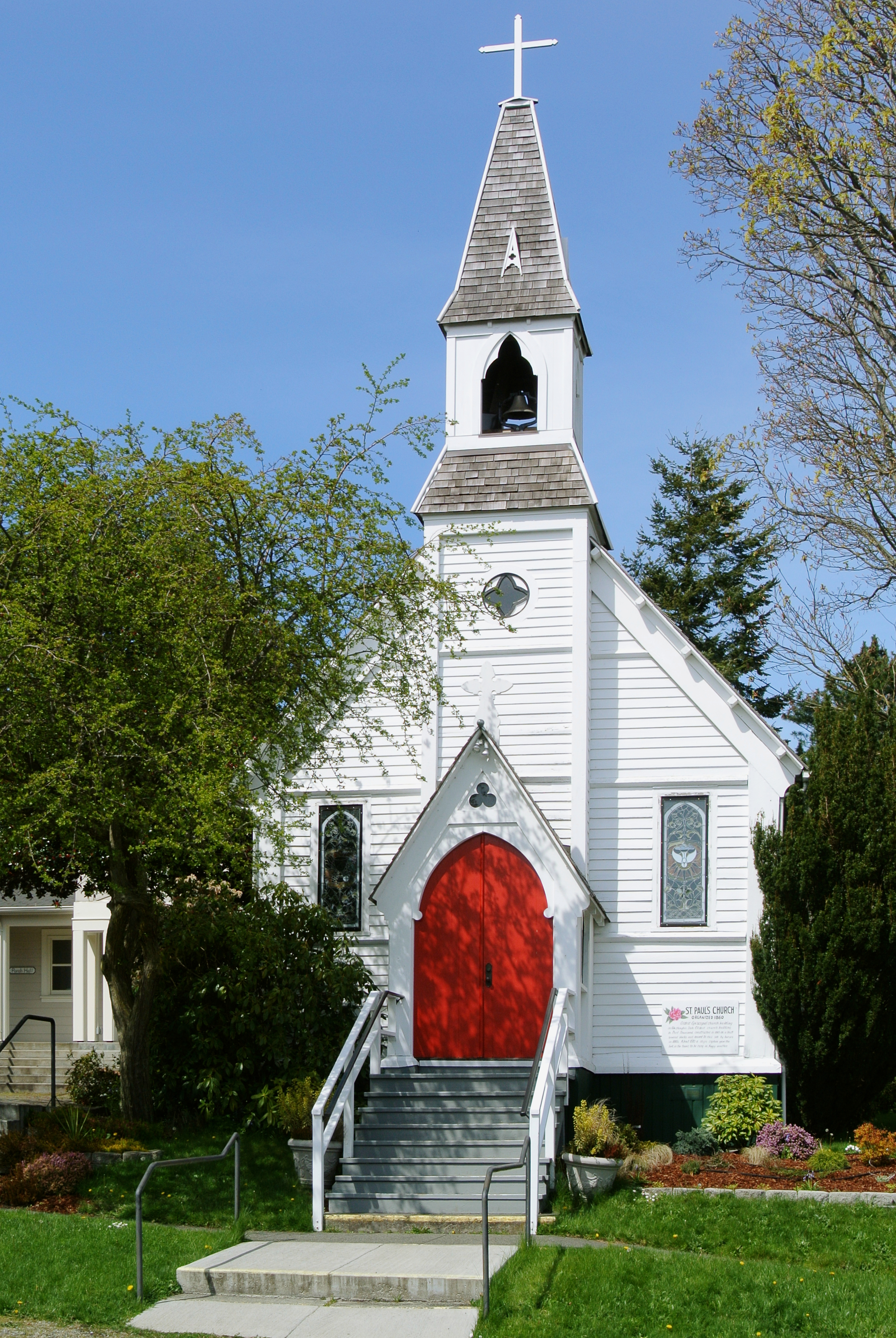
St Paul's Episcopal Church

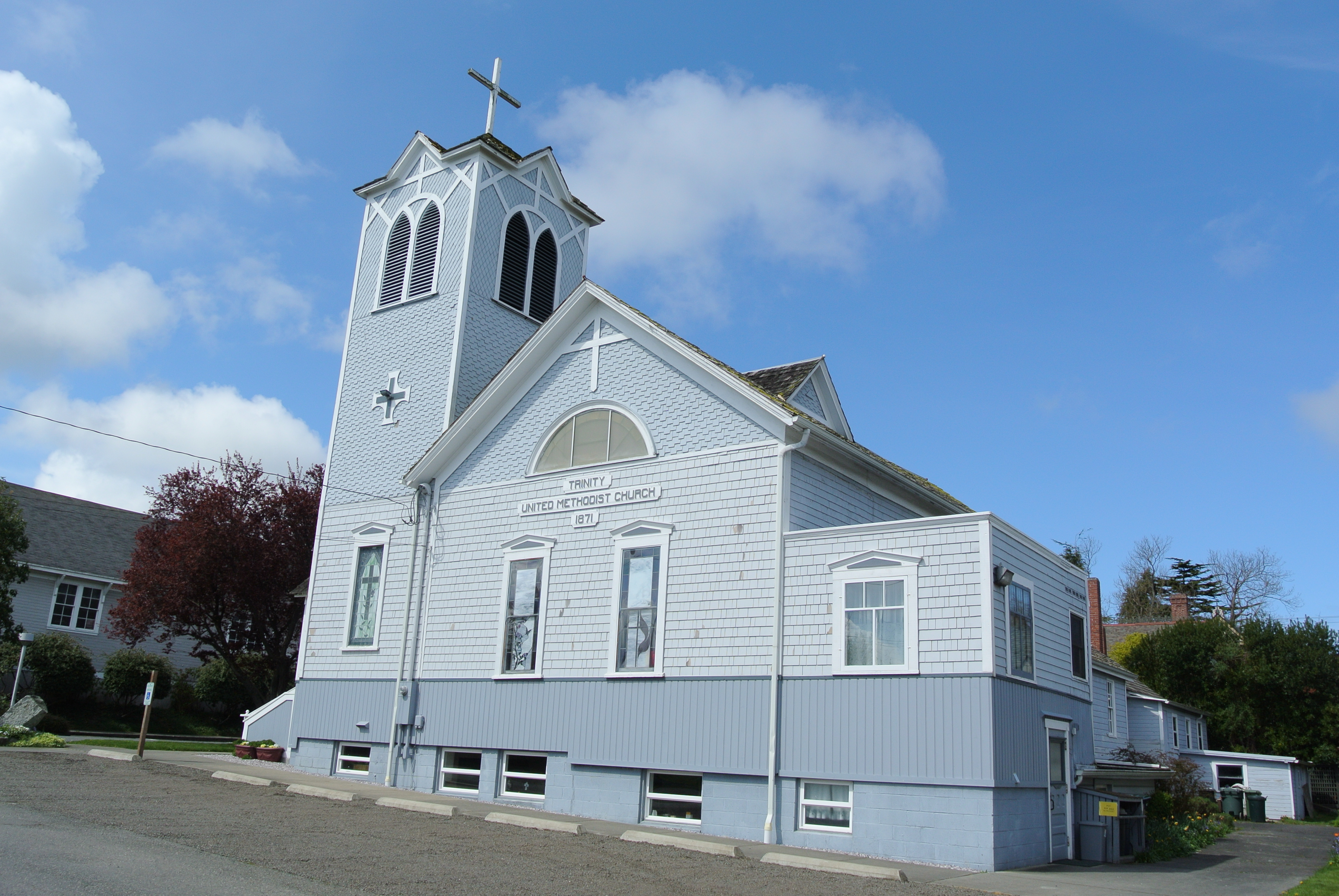
Trinity United Methodist church (1891)

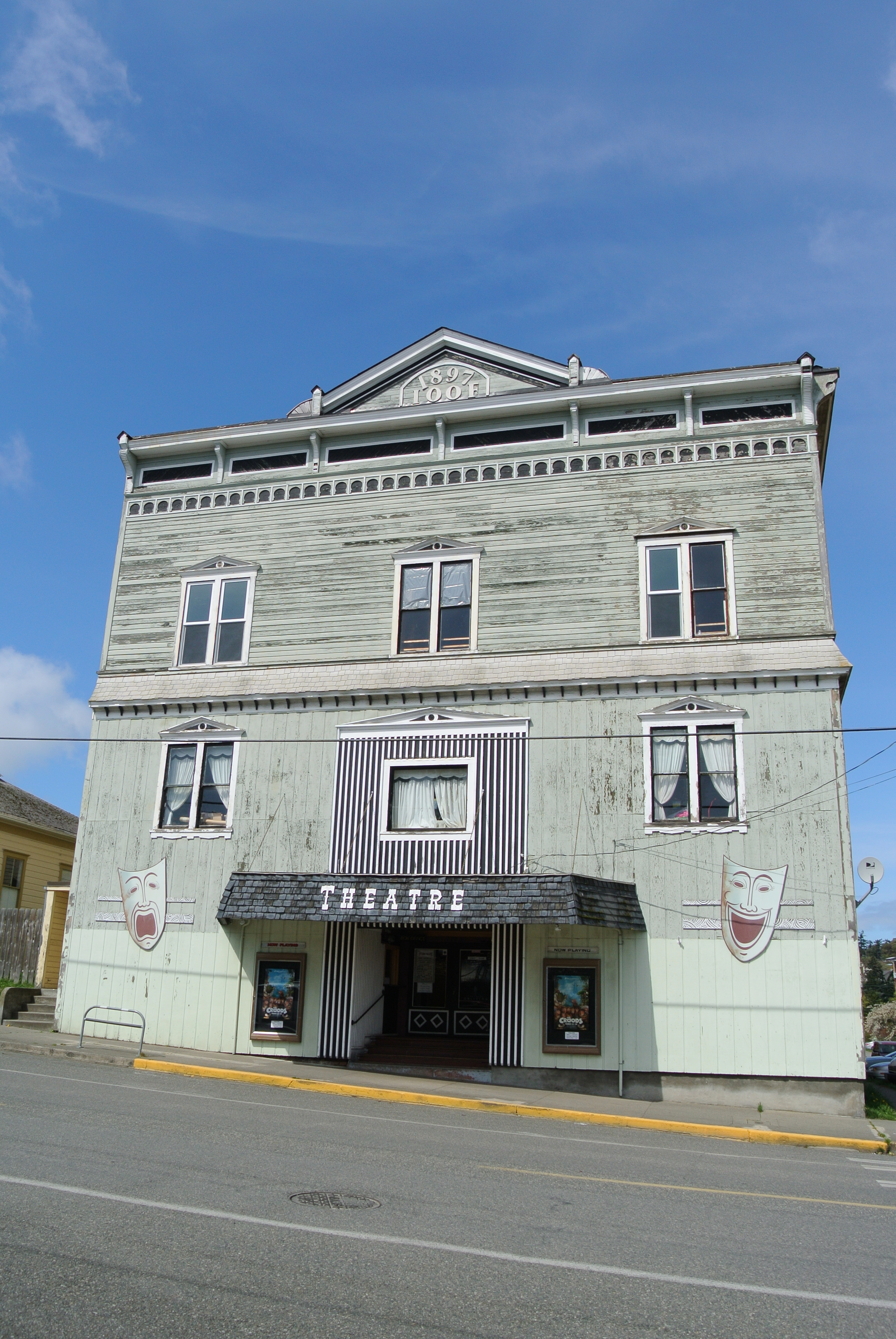
Uptown Theatre

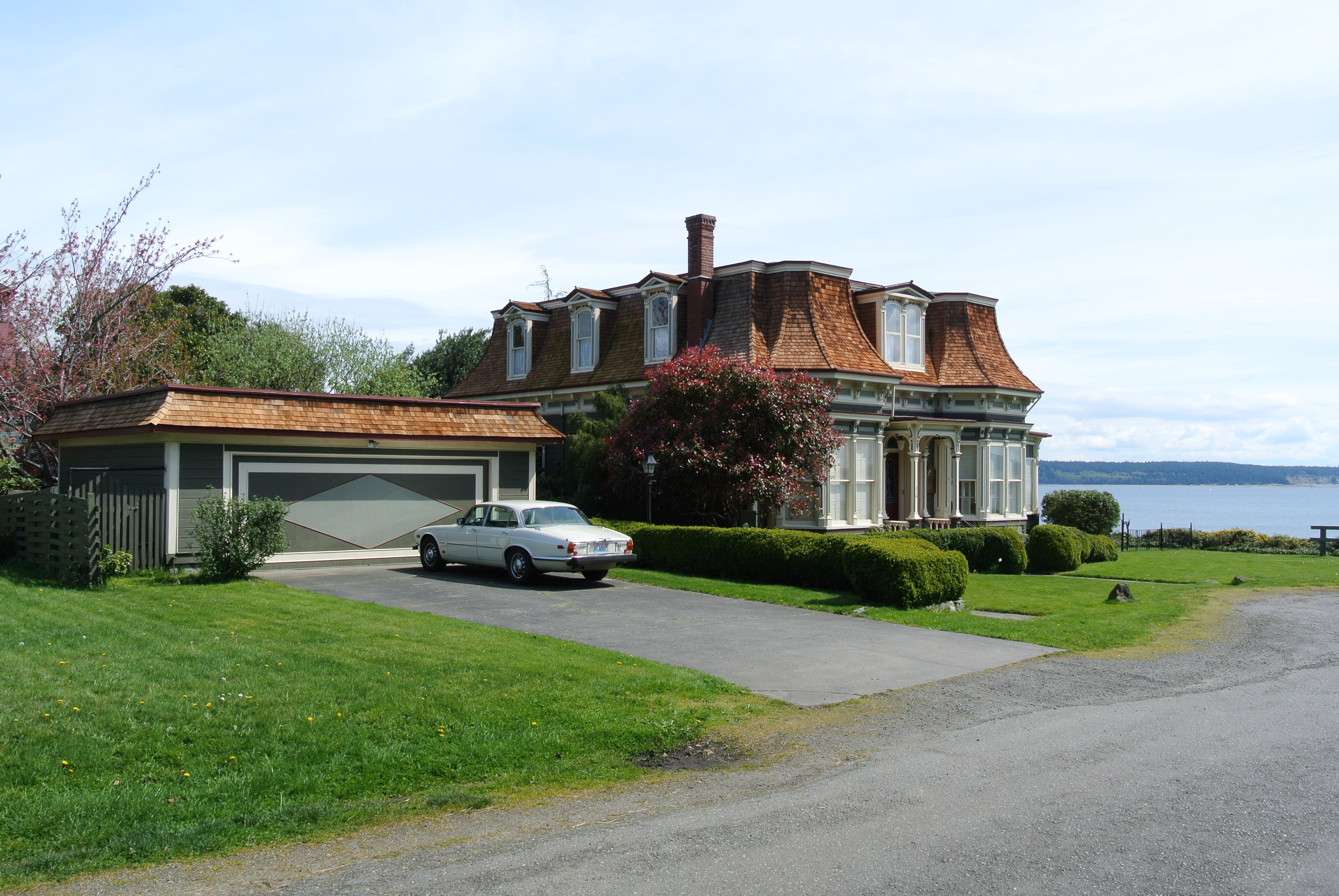
Frank Bartlett House

== See also ==
- List of National Historic Landmarks in Washington (state)
- National Register of Historic Places listings in Jefferson County, Washington
