= Viking Altar Rock =

Archaeological site in Sauk Centre, Minnesota, U.S.

Coordinates: 45°47′05″N 94°54′58″W

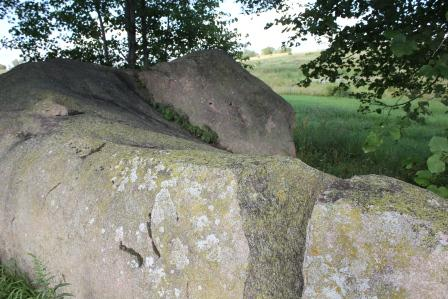
Viking Altar Rock

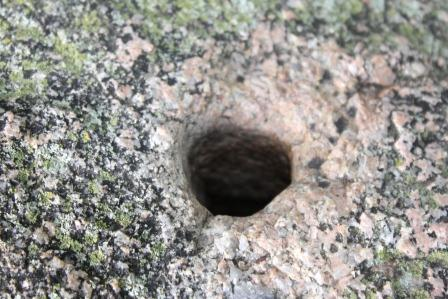
A closeup of one of the holes

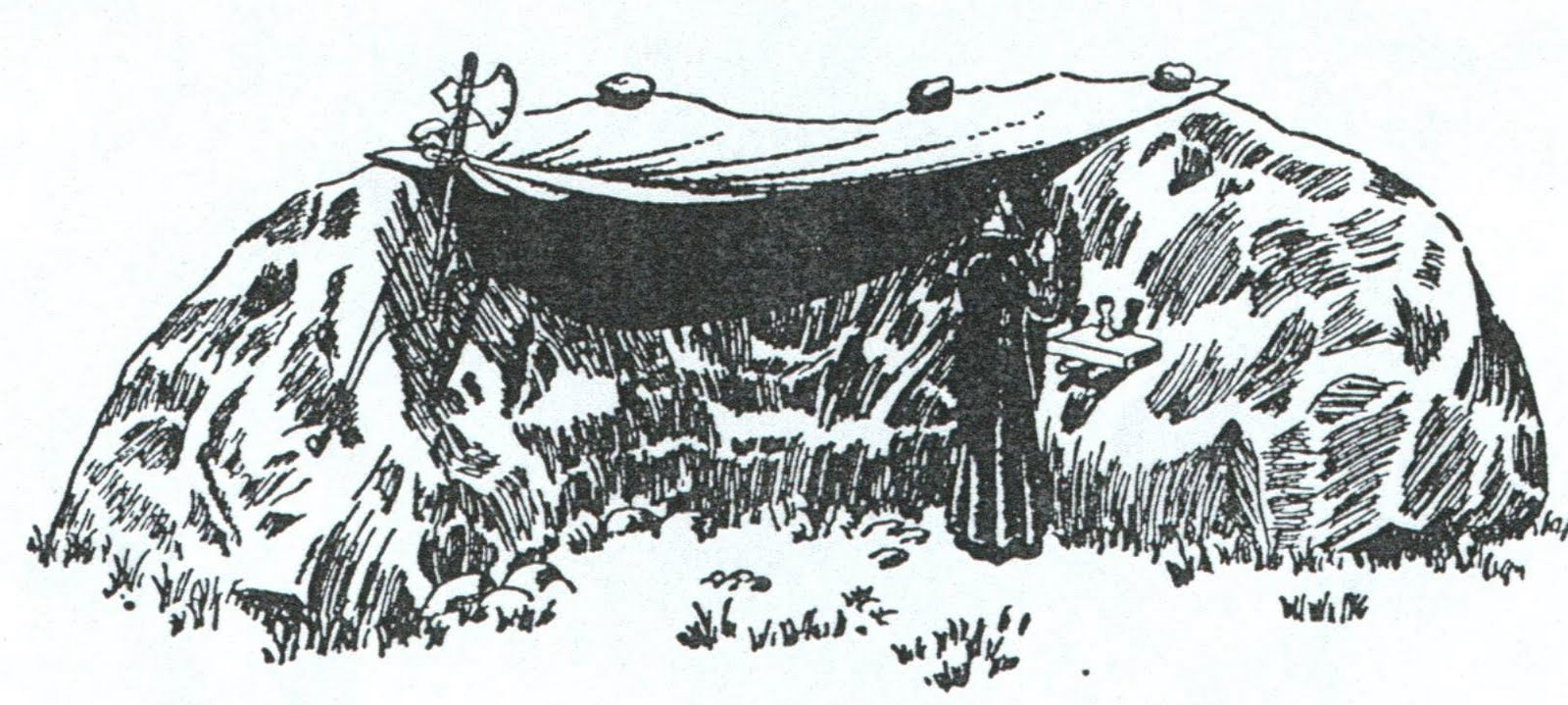
Sketch showing conjectural usage

The Viking Altar Rock in Sauk Centre, Minnesota, is a glacial erratic and a local landmark.

The boulder was found in 1943 and is roughly 8.2 m (27 ft) long by 5.2 m (17 ft) wide. It has four roughly triangular holes about 1 meter above the base. These holes are similar to those found throughout the area, chiseled into boulders by early farmers in the late 19th and early 20th century for the purpose of potentially blasting the rock. Not all were actually used, and there are many such examples, none of which have been shown to be of medieval or earlier Viking origin.

The rock is promoted as an attraction as part of a "Trail of the Vikings" featuring supposed evidence of Norse exploration of Minnesota. This is however conjecture, without support based on any actual archaeological or historical evidence that has been substantiated by research.

The "altar" was rededicated in August 1975 with an ecumenical celebration of Mass.

== See also ==
- List of individual rocks
- Skystone, a Western Washington erratic with pits drilled in its upper surface
