= Monster Rock =

Glacial erratic in Washington, US

- Glacial erratic
- Location within Washington (state)
- Coordinates: 47.3275°N 119.4680°W
- Location: On Ephrata Erratic Fan near Soap Lake, Washington
- Geology: glacial erratic

Monster Rock is a glacial erratic on the Ephrata Erratic Fan. It is a registered feature of the Ice Age Floods National Geologic Trail, on private property in Grant County, Washington. The rock is more than 25 feet (7.6 m) tall, and 60 feet (18 m) in diameter. It is among a grouping of rocks said to have "arrived here through the great floods through Grand Coulee."
