= Methodist Episcopal Church of Port Hadlock =

Historic church in Washington, United States

- U.S. National Register of Historic Places
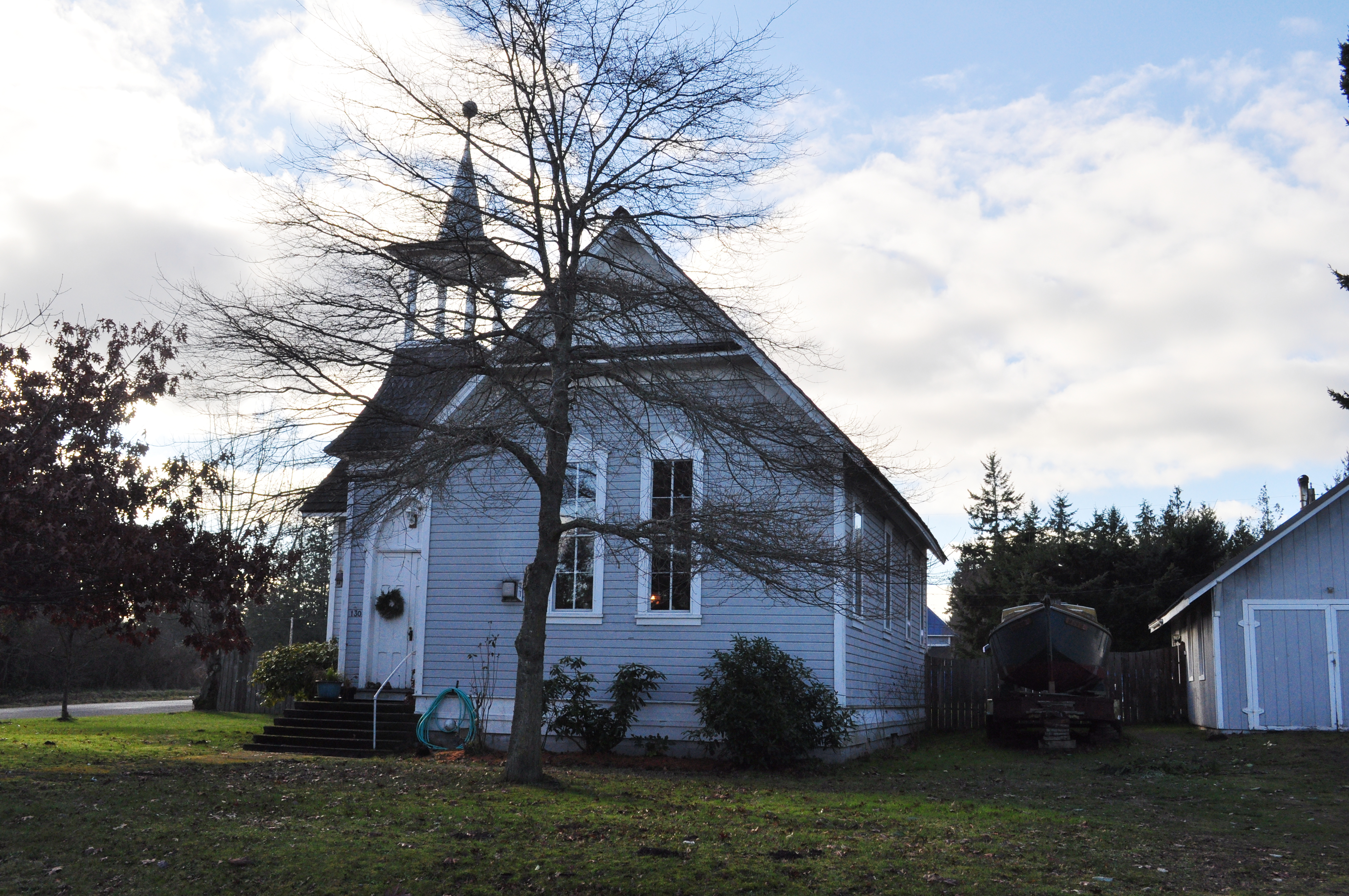

- Location within Washington (state)
- Location: Randolph and Curtiss Sts., Hadlock, Washington
- Coordinates: 48°2′2.93″N 122°45′23.52″W
- Area: less than one acre
- Built: 1903
- MPS: Eastern Jefferson County MRA
- NRHP reference No.: 83003329
- Added to NRHP: July 14, 1983

Methodist Episcopal Church of Port Hadlock (Barrett House) is a historic Methodist church, now a private home, at Randolph and Matheson Streets in Hadlock, Washington. Built in 1903, the church was the first permanent Methodist church in Hadlock. The congregation shared a traveling minister with the Methodist church in Chimacum. In the 1950s, the two congregations merged to form a new church; the Hadlock church's old bell and pews were moved to the new church, and the old building became a private residence.

The church was added to the National Register of Historic Places in 1983.
