= Rothschild House (Port Townsend, Washington) =

Historic house in Washington, United States

- U.S. National Register of Historic Places
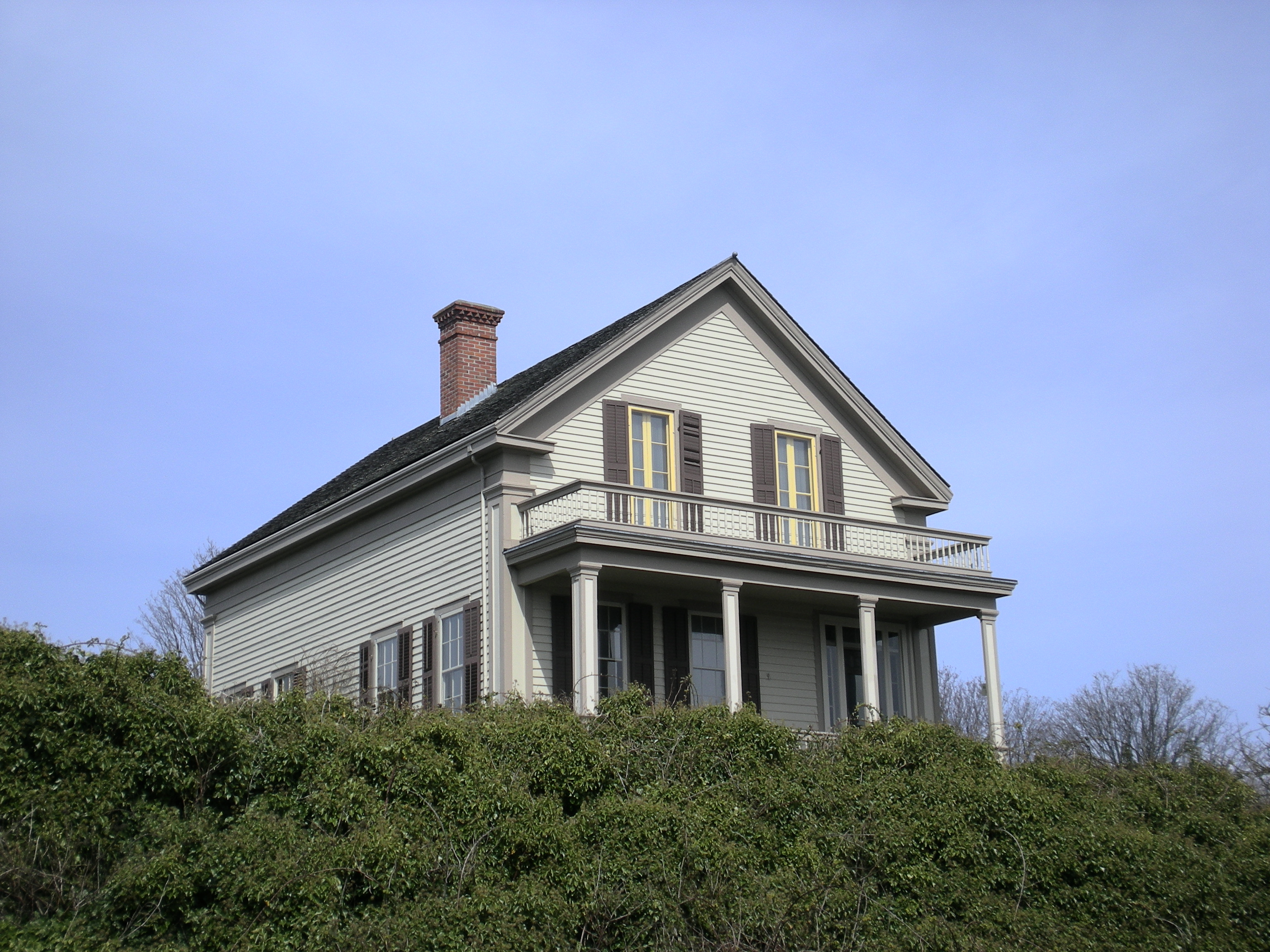

- Location within Washington (state)
- Interactive map showing the location of Rothschild House
- Location: Taylor and Franklin Sts., Port Townsend, Washington, U.S.
- Coordinates: 48°6′58″N 122°45′23″W
- Built: 1868
- Architect: Horace Tucker
- NRHP reference No.: 70000639
- Added to NRHP: September 29, 1970

The Rothschild House is a historic house in Port Townsend, Washington, U.S.. It was built by David Charles Henry Rothschild in 1868. The house is managed by the Jefferson County Historical Society as a historic house museum.

It was listed on the National Register of Historic Places in 1970; and is included in Port Townsend Historic District, which was declared a National Historic Landmark in 1977.

== Life of D.C.H. Rothschild ==
=== Early business ventures ===
David Charles Henry Rothschild (1824–1886; also known as D.C.H. Rothschild) was one of seven siblings from Sulzbach am Main, Kingdom of Bavaria. He came to the United States in 1840s. His brother, William, nearly 15 years older, had preceded him to America and settled in Harrodsburg, Kentucky, where he had an establishment called "The Kentucky Store". He joined his brother in this venture but, in 1848, he returned to Sulzbach for three months, then returned to America by way of Cape Horn, to San Francisco. There, he served as secretary of the Phoenix Quartz Mining Company and worked for both the Tehama Quartz Mining Company and the North California Mining Company. Later, he and a partner opened a store in Nevada City but sold out the following year, going first to New York and then back to Bavaria. A year later, he was back in Nevada City, and opened another store.

=== Travels ===
After operating his latest store for a year, he decided to travel to "exotic" places for the next three years, visiting China, the East Indies, Australia, Tahiti, and the Society Islands. He returned to San Francisco to be a miner for six months, then opened a tobacco and cigar store in Sacramento. It was there that he married. He chose to raise his family in Port Townsend, where he settled with his wife Dorette (also from Bavaria). Over time, he came to be known as "The Baron"; a reference to the famous Rothschild banking family.

=== Rothschild & Co. ===
In 1858, shortly after settling in Port Townsend, he established a new "Kentucky Store" which, in addition to being a regular mercantile store, provisioned ships and did some salvage operations. By 1881, shipping had become his primary focus and the business became "Rothschild & Company". Rothschild was found dead with a gunshot wound in April 1886 on the beach near the Cliff House Saloon, and his death was determined to be suicide.

His son Henry later took over the business and, in conjunction with his partner William J. Jones, expanded into stevedoring (or dockwork). That enterprise, now known as "Jones Stevedoring" is still in operation and is based at the Port of Seattle.
