= St. Paul's Episcopal Church (Port Townsend, Washington) =

- U.S. National Register of Historic Places
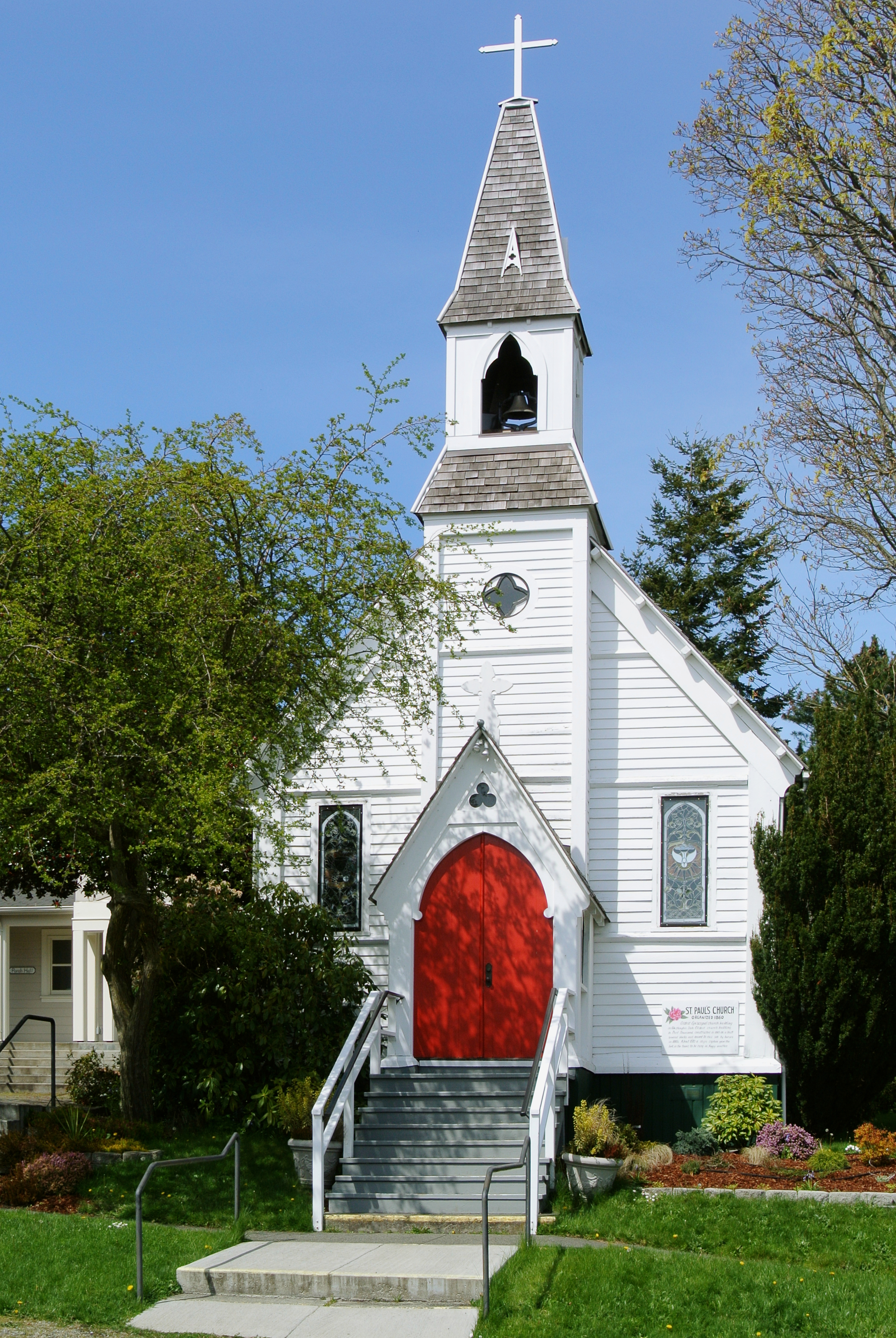

- Location within Washington (state)
- Location: Corner of Jefferson and Tyler Sts., Port Townsend, Washington
- Coordinates: 48°6′56″N 122°45′28″W
- Built: 1865
- Architectural style: Gothic Revival
- NRHP reference No.: 70000640
- Added to NRHP: September 29, 1970

The St. Paul's Episcopal Church is a Gothic Revival church in Port Townsend, Washington. It was listed on the National Register of Historic Places in 1970. It is included in Port Townsend Historic District which was declared a National Historic Landmark in 1977.
