= Glacial erratic boulders of King County, Washington =

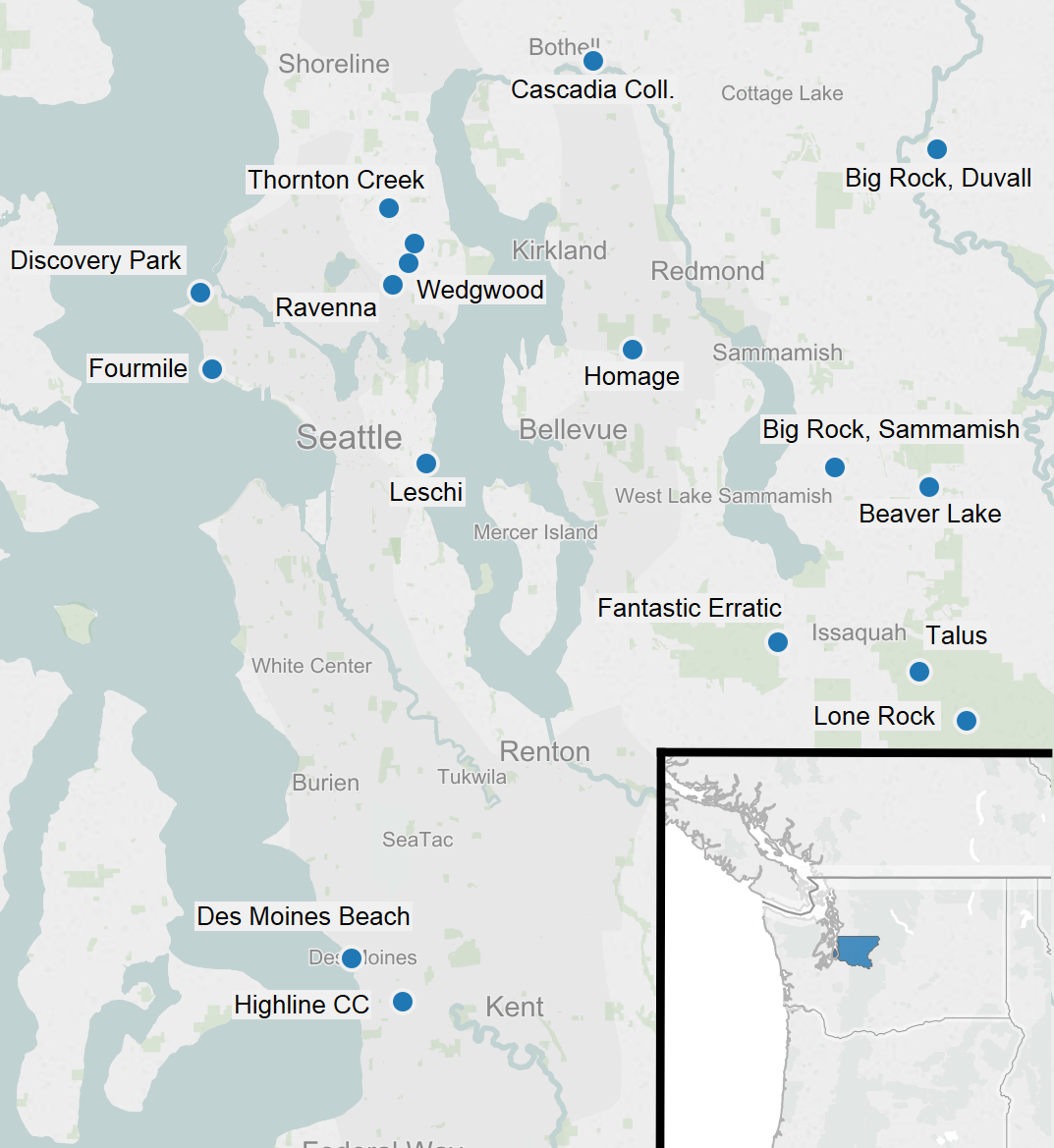
Locations of glacial erratics in King County, Washington

Glacial erratic boulders of King County are large glacial erratic boulders of rock which were moved into King County, Washington by glacial action during previous ice ages.

The Pleistocene ice age glaciation of Puget Sound created many of the geographical features of the region, including Puget Sound itself, and the erratics are one of the remnants of that age. According to Nick Zentner of Central Washington University Department of Geological Sciences, "Canadian rocks [are] strewn all over the Puget lowland, stretching from the Olympic Peninsula clear over to the Cascade Range." Erratics can be found at altitudes up to about 1,300–1,600 feet (400–490 m) in the Enumclaw area, along with kames, drumlins, and perhaps also the unique Mima mounds. The soil of Seattle, the county's (and state's) largest city, is approximately 80% glacial drift, most of which is Vashon glacial deposits (till), and nearly all of the city's major named hills are characterized as drumlins (Beacon Hill, First Hill, Capitol Hill, Queen Anne Hill) or drift uplands (Magnolia, West Seattle). Boulders greater than 3 meters in diameter are "rare" in the Vashon till, but can be found, as seen in the table below.

== List of boulders ==
Name and description	Height	Image
Beaver Lake Preserve erratics are glacial erratics in and around protected space in Sammamish, weighing up to 100 tons. The lake is a kettle lake also due to glaciation. In the 1950s otters would reportedly rest on the large erratic at the north end of Beaver Lake. 47°35′31.1″N 121°59′27.0″W		
Big Rock is an 8-foot (2.4 m) tall glacial erratic in the city of Duvall. A Duvall road, a park, and several businesses are named after it. The rock, and two non-native sequoias adjacent to it probably planted by area pioneers, are a local landmark. The erratic lies in what is said to be the smallest King County park, 20 by 70 feet (6.1 m × 21.3 m) in extent, that barely contains the rock and sequoias. The two lanes of Big Rock Road used to split into a wye around the rock, until a shopping center was built nearby in the 1990s. 47°43.542′N 121°59.189′W	8 feet (2.4 m)	
Big Rock Park erratic is a glacial erratic in the eponymous city park in Sammamish. Sammamish considered naming the park "Bigger Rock Park" to distinguish it from the identically named park in Duvall. 47.600°N 122.0469°W	8 feet (2.4 m)	
Cascadia College erratic Saved from destruction by sit-in conducted by Cascadia College environmental politics students, and relocated away from construction site. The rock, which several students occupied during the sit-in, was about 2 meters across before being jackhammered to two thirds its original size. 47.76059°N 122.18886°W	3 feet (0.91 m)	
Des Moines Beach erratic near Des Moines Beach Park in Des Moines 8 by 6 by 4.5 feet (2.4 m × 1.8 m × 1.4 m) 47°24.250′N 122°19.848′W	4.5 feet (1.4 m)	
Discovery Park beach erratics Four or more erratics on beach below Discovery Park. Largest is 15.33 feet (4.67 m) high, 69.5 feet (21.2 m) in circumference. 47°40.124′N 122°25.210′W	15.33 feet (4.67 m)	
Fantastic Erratic is a glacial erratic in Cougar Mountain Regional Wildland Park near Bellevue. It is approximately the size of a two-car garage, and 15 feet (4.6 m) high. 47°31′48.9″N 122°4′49.7″W	15 feet (4.6 m)	
Four Mile Rock (also Fourmile Rock) is a round granite erratic, approximately 20 feet (6.1 m) across, in the intertidal zone below Seattle's Magnolia Bluff and 60 yards offshore. It has had a navigational light placed on it and appears on nautical charts. Native Americans called the rock LE'plEpL, also written La'pub, and also called it Tele'tla (meaning "rock"). A legend says that a hero named Sta'kub could throw a giant cedar and hazel branch dragnet over the rock while standing at the beach. 47°38′20″N 122°24′48″W	15 feet (4.6 m)	
Highline College erratic. Granitic with "textbook en echelon dikes". 21 by 12 feet (6.4 m × 3.7 m) and 9 feet (2.7 m) high. 47.38730°N 122.30173°W	9 feet (2.7 m)	
Homage artwork boulders, three locations in Bridle Trails neighborhood of Bellevue, using "local granite boulders". Exposed granitic bedrock does not occur in western King County. 47°37′57.8″N 122°10′46.3″W (NE 24th); 47.6463°N 122.1644°W (NE 40th); 47.6605°N 122.1533°W (NE 60th)		
Leschi Park erratic in Seattle's Leschi Park is a sandstone erratic with many embedded bivalve fossils. Analysis of the fossils and the rock's minerals shows it may have come from the Nooksack Group near Mount Baker, or from the Harrison Lake area of southern British Columbia. 47.60103°N 122.28897°W	5 feet (1.5 m)	
Lone Rock in Tiger Mountain State Forest on Tiger Mountain 47°29.94′N 121°58.17′W	c. 15 feet (4.6 m)	
Ravenna Park erratic in Ravenna Park in Seattle, a granodiorite stone three yards (2.75 meters) tall in Ravenna Creek with a wooden footbridge that wraps around it. 47.67183°N 122.30689°W	c. 10 feet (3.0 m)	
Talus Rocks, a collection of piled erratics in Tiger Mountain State Forest on Tiger Mountain, forming rock caves (called "Devil's Dens" in New England) said to be among the largest in Washington. 47°31′07.1″N 121°59′49.2″W	c. 12 feet (3.7 m)	
Thornton Creek erratic near 17th Ave. NE and NE 104th St., in Seattle Parks' Kingfisher Natural Area. A local conservation group calls the area containing the boulder "Erratic Flats". 47°42′14″N 122°18′37″W	c. 8 feet (2.4 m)	
Wedgwood Rock is a glacial erratic (and known to geologists as the "Wedgwood Erratic") near the neighborhood of Wedgwood in Seattle, Washington. It is 80 feet (24 m) in circumference and 19 feet (5.8 m) or 26 feet (8 m) in height. Since 1970 it has been an offense punishable by a $100 fine to climb the rock. 47.68084°N 122.2973°W	26 feet (8 m)	
Wedgwood Square Park erratic 47.6882°N 122.2948°W	c. 4 feet (1.2 m)	

== See also ==
- List of individual rocks
