= Yakima Indian Painted Rocks =

State park in Yakima, Washington, USA

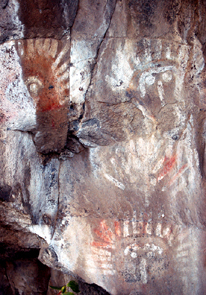
Indian Painted Rocks, Yakima, Washington

Indian Painted Rocks is a tiny state park (approximately 2,000 sq ft (200 m^{2})) right outside Yakima, Washington at the intersection of Powerhouse and Ackely Roads. The Indian rock paintings, also known as pictographs are on a cliff of basaltic rocks parallel to the current Powerhouse road which was once an Indian trail and later a main pioneer road that connected the Ahtanum valley to the Wenas mountains.

The paintings were originally thought to be only a few hundred years old but it is likely they are much older than that - possibly over 1000 years old. The pictographs were painted on the cliff when a prehistoric lake submerged the bottom. The natives painted the cliff from canoes using organic materials.[1]

The rock paintings are stylized polychromatic paintings using white, red and black colors. The paintings are said to have been enhanced by Lucullus Virgil McWhorter using enamel paints, a technique unacceptable to today's preservation community.

The state park was acquired from the Yakima Valley Canal Company in 1950.

A sign erected by the Washington State Highway Commission at the park's entrance states the following: Origin of these paintings is unknown to present day Indian tribes of this region. They are similar to many others found in western North America and are often interpreted as depicting religious experiences, as well as records of hunts or meetings with other tribes. This location was on the old Indian trail which ran from the Wenas Mountains to the Ahtanum bank of the Yakimas. In the 1850s, miners en route to British Columbia gold fields used the same trail. Later, as Americans settled the Yakima Valley, a stage coach route passed these cliffs.

In early 2007, the state parks department closed the Indian Painted Rocks park because of graffiti. There are plans to restructure the park in order to protect the painted rocks.

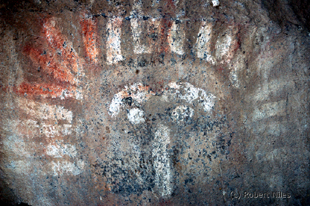
Pictograph closeup
