= Puget Sound salmon recovery =

Environmental project

Puget Sound salmon recovery is a collective effort of federal, state and local authorities and non-profit coalitions of universities, scientists, business and industry aimed at restoring Pacific salmon and anadromous forms of Pacific trout (Oncorhynchus) within the Puget Sound region. Puget Sound lies within the native range of the Pacific Salmon (Oncorhynchus) and two sea-run forms of Pacific trout, the coastal rainbow trout (O. mykiss irideus) or steelhead and coastal cutthroat trout (O. clarki clarki). Populations of Oncorhynchus have seen significant declines since the middle of the 19th century due to over fishing, habitat loss, pollution and disease. Salmon species residing in or migrating through Puget Sound to spawning streams include Chum (O. keta), Coho (O. kisutch), Chinook (O. tshawytscha), Sockeye (O. nerka), and Pink salmon (O. gorbuscha). Pacific salmon require freshwater rivers for spawning and most major tributaries of Puget Sound have salmon, steelhead and cutthroat trout spawning runs.

Major organizations involved in recovery efforts include the Puget Sound Partnership, Shared Strategy for Puget Sound, South Puget Sound Salmon Enhancement Group and Westsound Watersheds Council.

== Needs ==
Pacific salmon rely on nearshore waters and estuaries for survival during a part of their life cycle. Salmon use estuaries and near-shore areas for migration, juvenile rearing, refuge, and feeding. Large trees in rivers are no longer common. The Nisqually River was in pristine condition when it was layered with log jams. It turns out, logjams actually help salmon, partly by slowing the speed of the river and by creating cool pools and channels that are good places for adult and juvenile fish to hide, feed and spawn. When 90% of wetlands were lost, 90% of salmon was also lost.

A Migratory Path

Puget Sound's near-shore region is composed of shallow saltwater, nearby wetlands, estuaries, beaches, and bluffs. These areas are critical zones for juvenile salmon as they make the transition from rivers to the ocean. Salmon are known to move through estuaries twice in their lifetimes. The first move is as juveniles when they move to the sea, and the second is as adults when they transition back to the rivers in order to spawn.

A Place To Adjust

Juvenile salmon spend a prolonged period of time (weeks to months) in estuaries in order to help ease their bodies adapt to the transition from fresh water to salt water. In a process called “Smoltification”, salmon are able to make the next step in preparing their bodies for the transition from freshwater to saltwater. Specifically, their bodies go through dramatic changes portrayed through their outward appearance, behavior, and even body chemistry. When these salmon return as adults they must go through the same process again in estuaries to help make the transition from saltwater to freshwater before heading back to their respective rivers to spawn.

There are a number of different species of salmon that run through Puget Sound. Such salmon species include Chum, Coho, Chinook, Sockeye, Pink, and Steelhead. These salmon swim through Puget Sound to spawn in the rivers running into Puget Sound. Some Puget Sound rivers that salmon swim up are: Nooksack, Samish, Skagit, Baker, Cascade, Stillaguamish, Snohomish, Skykomish, Green, Puyallup, Carbon, Nisqually, Deschutes rivers. Salmon also go up Lake Washington, Lake Sammamish, Kennedy Creek, and Minter Creek.

== Life cycle ==
The life cycle of salmon requires specific conditions within the chain of connected environments. Salmon typically live 3–6 years, which often changes depending on life conditions. While some salmon stay within Puget Sound, others will migrate and live deeper in the Pacific Ocean. The salmon begin their journey as fertilized eggs in a stream that eventually hatch and move downstream in freshwater (lasting anywhere from months to three years depending on species). Once they mature to juvenile salmon, also known as “fry”, they migrate from the freshwater stream towards a brackish estuary where “saltwater meets freshwater”. Here, they begin to adapt to the salt water during a process known as smoltification, which can last up to a few months. Smoltification is crucial to ensure survival of salmon once they enter the Pacific Ocean. At this point, they are ready to transition through the coastal shores into the North Pacific Ocean where they stay anywhere from six months up to five years and travel as far as the Gulf of Alaska. Depending on the species, the salmon are ready to return to their home stream, river, or lake after one to seven years of being in the ocean to begin the process of spawning. Once the salmons spawn, the process begins again with the new salmon.

Juvenile salmon: The Most Crucial Stage of the Life Cycle

As mentioned above, juvenile salmon utilize estuaries to transition from freshwater to saltwater environments. Estuaries have "brackish" water conditions, in which water is not purely freshwater or saltwater, but rather an 'in-between.' These estuaries contain the necessary amount of both fresh and salt water so the salmon can steadily adapt without causing harm to their body chemistry, in the process called "smoltification". While this meeting of fresh and salt is necessary, juvenile salmon use estuaries for more than a place of adaption. Eelgrass, also known as Vallisneria, and other aquatic vegetation grows submersed (completely aquatic) or emergent (partially aquatic) or around shoreline areas, offering protection and supplemental food for juvenile salmon from predators such as larger, grown salmon, birds of prey, bears, and cougars. Furthermore, "juvenile salmon experience the highest growth rates of their lives while in estuaries and nearshore waters". Since nutrients are so crucial to their growth, the complex food web produced from these water plants such as eelgrass serves the juvenile salmon well, and these salmon tend to be more selective, using instincts to tell them what will better prepare their bodies for ocean residence or migration later in their lives.

== Habitat loss ==
Although salmon spend only a part of their life cycle in near-shore areas, these habitats are critical to the survival of salmon populations. Shoreline habitats of Puget Sound have suffered significant losses over the last 125 years. When marshes are lost, young salmon lose food and shelter. Studies show a 73 percent decline in salt marsh habitats bordering Puget Sound. Nearly all salt marsh habitats within major urban areas along Puget Sound have been destroyed. The Puyallup River Delta, for example, lost 100 percent of its nearshore habitat. Other factors that contribute to habitat loss are pollutants, bulkheads, loss of shoreline vegetation and the blockage from docks and piers. Polluted estuaries and nearshore areas have caused juvenile salmon to suffer adverse effects as they pass through the estuaries. Human-caused stresses can cause immune dysfunction, increased susceptibility to disease, and impaired growth. Bulkheads can disrupt shore drift and shoreline vegetation, thus eliminating cover and food sources for young salmon. Loss of shoreline vegetation along the shore is of particular importance to juvenile salmon because it stabilizes the shoreline, provides shade, acts as a protective cover, organic input and food source for young salmon moving in close to shore. The decrease in riparian vegetation along the shoreline can also account for an increase in stream temperature, which can benefit invasive species of bacteria and parasites that are harmful to the salmon. There are also concerns over hatchery spawned salmon that are capable of spreading diseases to wild populations of juvenile salmon. These wild spawns are not able to fight off these illnesses that the hatchery fish are given antibiotics for, which can also drop wild spawn rates. Arguments can also be made that while hatcheries are able to meet conservation and sustainable fishery goals, they are not meant to be a long-term solution to the native salmon populations sustainability. This can give a false sense of security to the public and mislead them into thinking hatcheries are a viable long-term solution to the native salmon populations and that they can benefit the salmon and the environment. Furthermore, while hatchery fish raise the overall population of salmon that can be harvested, they also attributed to the decline in ecosystem and natural wild populations. The added population of hatchery fish to the wild population can also lead to an over harvest of the wild populations due to the overcompensation of hatchery fish being released and fishermen assuming they’re catching the hatchery spawns. The hatchery fish can also affect the density dependent mortality rate of the wild populations as the increase of juvenile hatchery spawned salmon affects the carrying capacity of the wild salmon’s native environment. This leads to competition among the two groups and limits the number of fish the ecosystem can support. Docks and piers can block light to underwater habitats such as eelgrass meadows, and sources of food and shelter for juvenile salmon and other marine life.

In conclusion, of all of the threats that salmon are faced with, including climate change, disease and animal predation, habitat loss is one of the greatest threats. Salmon face multiple obstacles throughout their cycle that add on the four mentioned before: loss of access to historic habitat, habitat destruction, pesticide use, aquaculture, urban development and encroachment onto riparian areas and increasing water temperatures in streams. It is critical to have open passages to natal or home streams for adults to spawn. If their energy is depleted before they spawn, they die without producing the net generation of fish. Warming water temperature and low water levels in streams also accelerate pre-spawn mortality.

== History ==
Salmon are a national treasure and local Pacific Northwest Icon, yet human development is destroying their habitats while their wild populations decline. The Chinook salmon's hooked mouth represents a number of Native American tribes. Humans have witnessed three unsuccessful experiments with salmon and their efforts to adapt to a shifting environment, impacted by humans, in England, New England, and today in Puget Sound. Before settlement there were an estimated 10-16 million salmon in the Columbia Basin. 29% of these populations are now extinct, and 27 species are threatened or endangered. Fishing and hatcheries has reduced salmon biocomplexity. Puget Sound action Team and Puget Sound Partnership are working to get immediate actions to save and protect Puget Sound Salmon. “If history has a lesson here, it is that technological fixes and politically motivated half measures will at best delay the inevitable.”

== Puget Sound Recovery Plan ==
Puget Sound used to home a much more diverse and robust population of Chinook Salmon. Current levels of Chinook are around 10% of historic numbers. Some of the salmon populations are at less than 1% of their historic numbers. 15 of the 37 Chinook populations have disappeared and their steep decline is strongly correlated with the deterioration of Puget Sound as a whole.

In 1999, the Endangered Species Act (ESA) listed the Chinook salmon, summer chum and bull trout in Puget Sound. As a result, the National Oceans and Atmosphere Administration (NOAA) working in collaboration with Shared Strategies, and the Puget Sound Technical Recovery team to combine recovery efforts to produce a single plan of the region. This was the beginning of the Puget Sound Salmon Recovery Project.

In 2005, Shared Strategies presented a regional plan for the recovery of ESA listed Chinook salmon in Puget Sound. After two years of clarifying, finalizing and expanding the proposal making sure it complied with all ESA requirements, NOAA finally adopted the final Puget Sound Salmon Recovery Plan. However, the cost of this recovery plan is enormous, according to the Washington State Recreation and Conservation Office this recovery plan has an estimated cost of 1.42 billion dollars for the first ten years.

What the Puget Sound Partnership is Doing to Recover Salmon

The Puget Sound Partnership was designated to serve as the regional recovery organization on January 1, 2008. The rigorous recovery plan was built through a multi-year stakeholder process. The partnership is working with various communities, tribes, businesses, and state and federal agencies to implement programs that will hopefully help recover salmon. These programs include protecting and restoring habitat, raising public awareness, reforming hatchery management, assuring integration of harvest practices, and developing a monitoring and adaptive management strategy to help track and assess efforts to recover salmon in Puget Sound. To ensure the recovery goes well, salmon recovery and Sound recovery must go hand in hand. The Partnership is working with watersheds to implement lasting solutions to the challenges facing Puget Sound and Salmon.

== Importance of using low-impact development methods in the Built Environment ==
Paving large expanses of land increases runoff of pollutants into streams and rivers that eventually wash into Puget Sound. This impact is evident in the fact that salmon have large quantities of PCBs in their bodies. In 2007 the Department of Health issued a consumption advisory warning against eating Puget Sound salmon.

Since 1991, there has been a marked increase in the amount of impervious surfaces in the Greater Puget Sound area. Impervious surfaces are man-made structures such as roads, house foundations and roofs that prevent water from being absorbed and filtered through the soil. Stormwater management systems have reached their capacity to catch and treat this runoff water. Sudden increases in stream flow that occur during high rainfall can be greatly exacerbated by urbanization that replaces natural vegetation with pavement or rooftops.

The Department of Ecology found that surface runoff is the largest source of toxic chemicals being deposited into Puget Sound. Streams drain directly into Puget Sound from roads, driveways and rooftops, without benefit of filtration.

It is possible to reduce pollution of streams and rivers by using Low Impact Development (LID) methods in construction projects. These low-impact development methods are environmentally friendly by reducing the amount of storm water runoff that reaches Puget Sound. These building methods not only help Puget Sound salmon, but also benefit humans through increasing property values, and enhancing aesthetic appeal.

Rain gardens

Salmon friendly gardens, also called rain gardens, would prevent overflow and surges and would absorb pollutants which would otherwise be washed directly into freshwater systems. When a storm causes rainwater to surge into rivers and streams via storm drains, the heavy flow of fast moving water commonly erodes the soil thus destroying precious salmon and steelhead habitat. Said storm drain surges are typically warmer in temperature than the water of the streams into which they are being deposited. This causes river and stream temperatures to rise and places further stress on growing and migrating salmon and steelhead. The salmon friendly gardens are planted as depressions in the ground, and work by absorbing much of the rainwater runoff which is redirected to first flow through the gardens before ultimately ending up in the rivers and streams. The gardens therefore slow and lessen the storm surges and filter out pollutants being washed out of the city. Planting rain gardens would result in less erosion, lower and stable water temperatures, and less pollutants entering freshwater systems.

Urbanization

Urbanization of the Puget Sound lowlands has had a primarily negative impact on the salmon species that spawn in the surrounding streams and rivers. One of the most noticeable changes in these urbanized areas is the increase in the traditional 10-year flood being reduced to occurring once every 1–4 years. As a result of this increase in flood waters the areas where salmon lay their eggs are being washed away; this is because salmon lay their eggs just far enough beneath the bedrock to accommodate for the traditional annual flood, but due to urbanization the annual flood waters have increased and the layer of bedrock where salmon lay their eggs is washed away. This leaves the salmon with less habitat to successfully spawn on as a result. As stated above the one way to fix this problem is to use LID methods to help with the filtration process which at the same time reduces the quantity of water being put into the streams and rivers.

== Salmon and the economy ==
In a letter to Senators Patty Murray and Maria Cantwell, Washington State's Trollers Association board member Jeremy Brown noted that salmon "aren't just a part of our state's natural heritage, they are also very important to our economy." The letter was composed by 120 business and community leaders who expressed a range of concerns. But, other business owners tend to agree that salmon are a crucial to the state's economy, and that recovery efforts do not go far enough to protect them.

In the Pacific Northwest, fishing accounts for 36,000 full-time jobs including catching, canning, and selling. However, one must also consider the jobs created by Puget Sound Salmon not directly related to the fish. The sale of boats, boating equipment, and other fishing necessities are impacted greatly by the continued supply of salmon. Fishermen warn that if the salmon supply continues to dry up, so will their jobs, and the jobs of many who depend on them.

There are groups that are trying to make the relationship between people, salmon, and the economy more sustainable. In 1999, The Center for Watershed and Community Health (CWCH) created the Salmon Economics Project in order to assist decision makers in understanding economic issues regarding salmon. The Project claims that salmon issues are widespread and have deep roots, and that habitats must be restored across large landscapes. They provide possible solutions for the problem, such as resource pricing for fish, stable trade, and well-trained workers.

There is also a strong argument that dams are detrimental to the economy because of their effect on salmon. According to Idaho Rivers United, recent studies show that dam removal will save U.S. taxpayers and Northwest electricity consumers billions of dollars and generate billions more in increased tourism, outdoor recreation and improved sport and commercial fishing opportunities.

== Cultural significance ==
Salmon are cultural icons in the Pacific Northwest. Specifically, Puget Sound is home to thousands of invertebrate species, 200 species of fish, 100 species of sea birds, and 26 kinds of marine mammals. Of all these species, salmon and killer whales are the most iconic and culturally relevant to the Native American tribes within the Pacific Northwest region. Salmon are born in streams than head to the sea as juveniles. After spending a few years in the ocean, they return to their birth streams in order to spawn (reproduce). Historically, Puget Sound was one of the most salmon-filled regions evident from the bountiful salmon-bearing streams that essentially had an unlimited supply of salmon. Consequently, due to the expansion of urban development salmon populations are dwindling due to the deterioration of salmon and their crucial habitats. Holistically, the sharp decline in salmon can also be attributed to the decline of killer whales in the region. These killer whales rely heavily on healthy population of salmon and other fish in the region but are left starving to death because of the declining fish population caused from human pollution and urban development.

Many Native American tribes along the Columbia River and Snake River say that salmon were given as food to the tribes from the creator. Native tribes had few options of food, often resorting to Western Skunk Cabbage. When the first spring salmon swam up the rivers, they were greeted by their uncle, Skunk Cabbage. Their uncle told them that they have the duty to protect the Native people from starvation, as he had done for many years. As a reward, the salmon gave their uncle a war club, an elk hide, and moist fertile soil along the edge of the river to thrive in for the rest of his years.

Native tribes of the Puget Sound have had a longtime historical connection with salmon and managed the population in a balanced way over the last 1500 years. The Pacific Northwest region is a conducive environment for salmon and the fish play a significant role in the survival of the local indigenous economy and culture.. Historically, harvest rate and fish losses were only attributed to natural phenomena and indigenous fishing practices. Consequently, a new phenomenon has compromised the balance between salmon and humans. In the 19th century, the sudden arrival of early pioneers and entrepreneurs to the region with advanced fishing equipment led to unprecedented salmon numbers being caught. The addition of a new market-driven industrial economy has also provided new vulnerabilities for the Pacific Northwest's salmon runs, causing a mobilization of environmentalists to protect the Puget Sound salmon. They have sought to work with political authorities to protect the cultural and environmental value of Puget Sound salmon for future generations.
