= Lake Lawrence =

Lake in Thurston County, Washington, United States

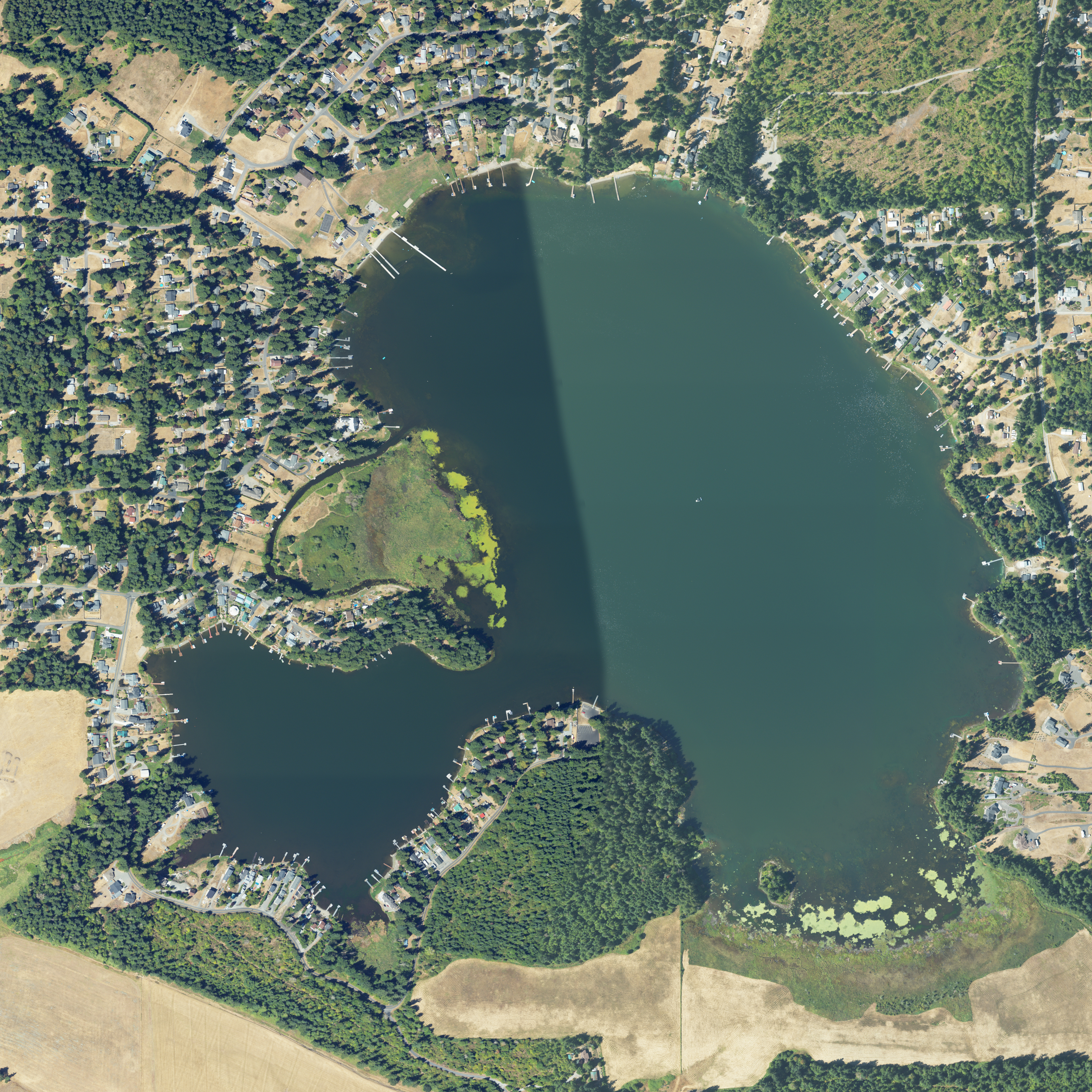
- Lake Lawrence in August 2023
- Location: Thurston County, Washington
- Coordinates: 46°51′07″N 122°34′16″W
- Basin countries: United States
- Surface area: 326.5 acres (132.1 ha)
- Surface elevation: 429 ft (131 m)
- Website: wdfw.wa.gov
- References: Geographic Names Information System: 1521951; 1532475

Lake Lawrence is a 326.5-acre (1.321 km^{2}) lake located near Yelm in Thurston County, Washington, United States. The lake is impounded by Lake Lawrence Dam.

Lake Lawrence was named after Lindley and Sam Lawrence, businesspeople in the local logging industry. A notable glacial erratic, the Lake Lawrence erratic, abuts a county road near the lake.

== See also ==
- List of geographic features in Thurston County, Washington
