= Capt. Enoch S. Fowler House =

- U.S. National Register of Historic Places
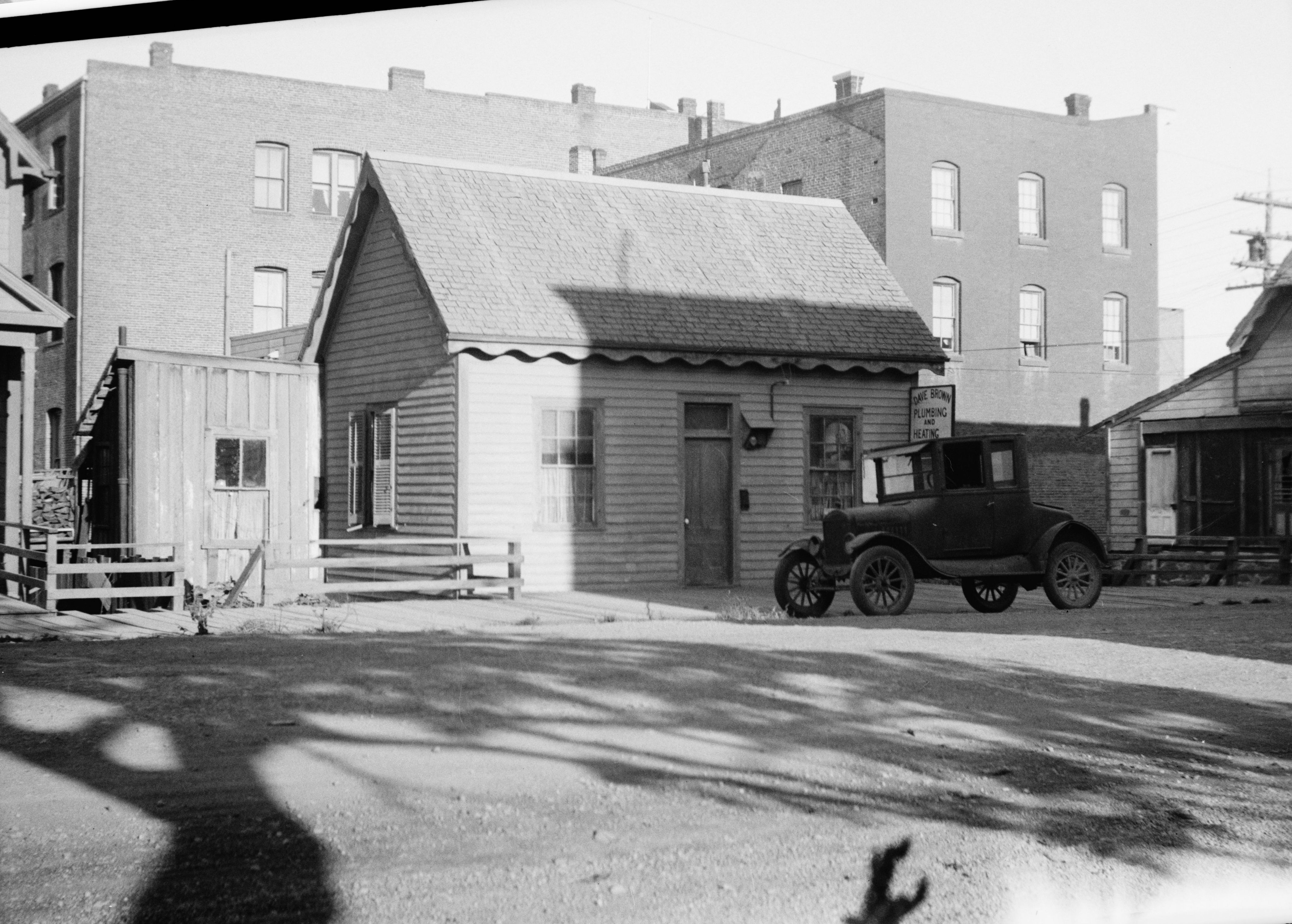

- Location within Washington (state)
- Location: Corner of Polk and Washington Sts., Port Townsend, Washington
- Coordinates: 48°6′50″N 122°45′35″W
- Built: 1865
- NRHP reference No.: 70000635
- Added to NRHP: September 29, 1970

The Capt. Enoch S. Fowler House is a house in Port Townsend, Washington. It was listed on the National Register of Historic Places in 1970. It is included in Port Townsend Historic District which was declared a National Historic Landmark in 1977.
