= Tamanowas Rock =

Geographical feature in Washington, United States

- Chimacum Rock, Tamanous Rock
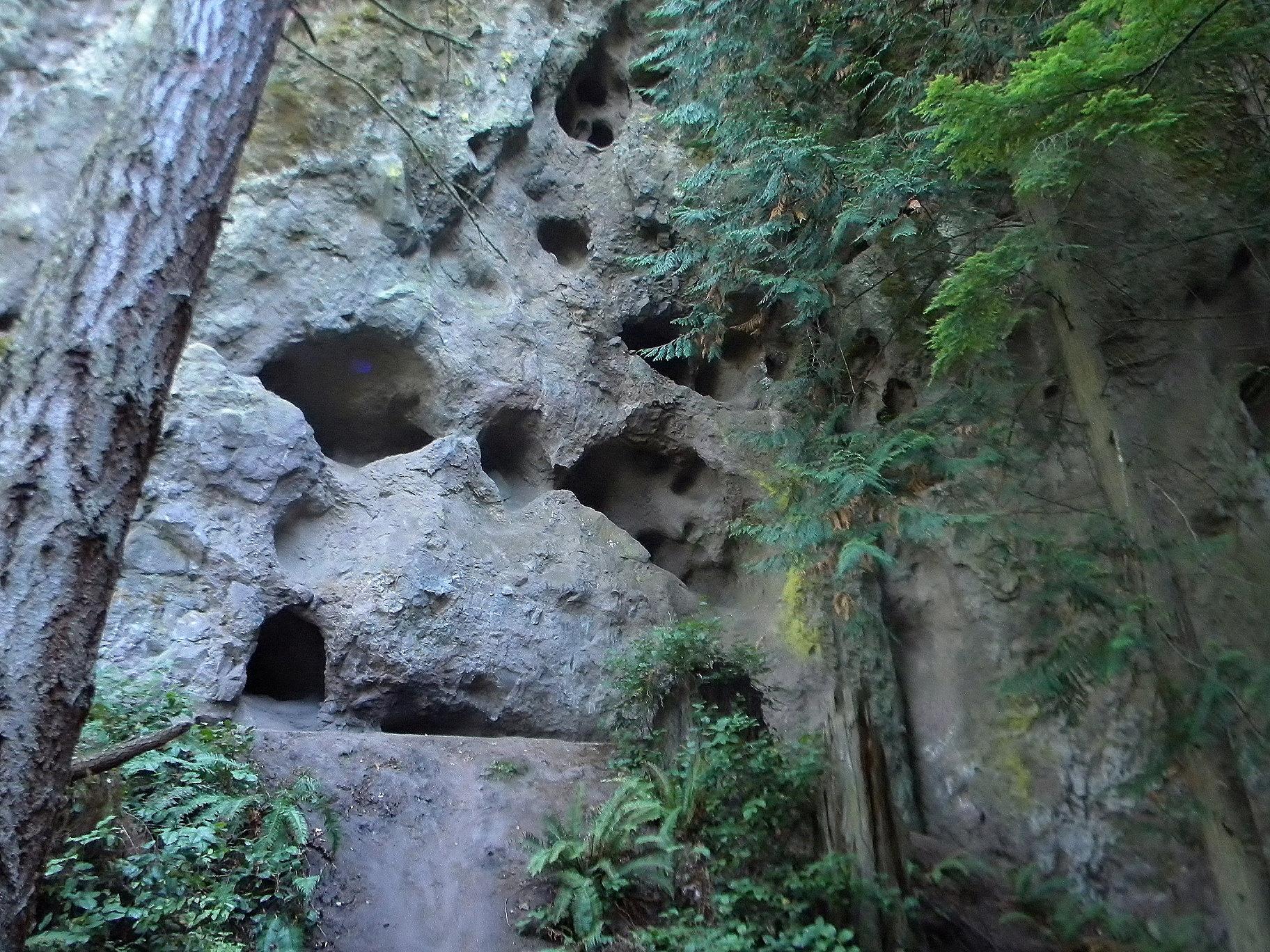

Highest point
- Elevation: 440 ft (130 m)
- Prominence: 150 ft (46 m)
- Coordinates: 48°01′19″N 122°47′36″W

Geography
- Location within the United States
- Location: Jefferson County, Washington, US
- Parent range: Near Olympic Mountains
- Topo map(s): USGS Port Townsend South, WA

Geology
- Mountain type: Batholith
- Nearest city: Chimacum, Washington
- Area: 84.4 acres (34.2 ha)
- Established: 1990s–December 21, 2012
- Governing body: Jamestown S'Klallam Tribe

Tamanowas Rock (Klallam: t̕əménəwəs) (also spelled Tamanous), also called Chimacum Rock, is a 150-foot (46 m) high rock with caves and crevices that lies in a forest adjacent to Anderson Lake State Park, near Port Townsend, Washington. It is a sacred site to the Coast Salish peoples of the Pacific Northwest and a pilgrimage site. The rock was listed on the National Register of Historic Places in 2015.

== History ==
Tamanowas Rock is said to have first been used 10,000 years ago by the Chimakum (or Chemacum) people, leading to its alternate name "Chimacum Rock", whose name is also found in other local geographic features. In accordance with legend, it may have been used as a refuge from the tsunami caused by the 1700 Cascadia earthquake, and earlier as a lookout for hunting now-extinct mastodon. "Tamanowas" means "spirit power" in the Klallam language.

== Preservation ==
The site is either a registered archaeological site, or nominated to become one with the Washington State Department of Archaeology.

In 2013, the rock was purchased with 62 acres (25 ha) of surrounding land by the Jamestown S'Klallam Tribe for preservation, at the end of a series of loans and purchases by organizations including Washington State Parks, Bullitt Foundation and Jefferson Land Trust, that started in 2009. The land was added to an existing 22-acre purchase by the tribe. Prior to this, it was a rock climbing site, a practice which was ended when the S'Klallam Tribe took ownership.

=== Desecration ===
In 2014, the rock was desecrated with graffiti, gaining national and international attention.

== Geology ==
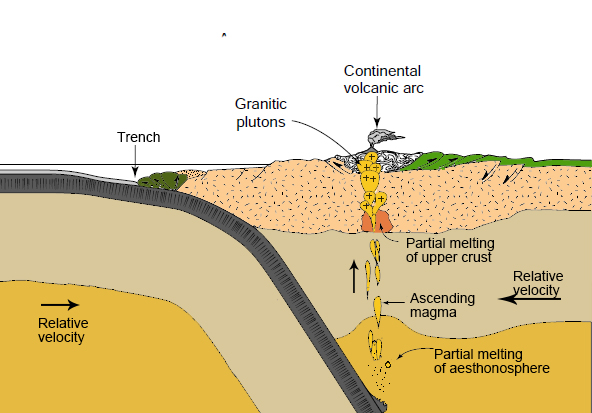
Formation of magmatic arc in a subduction zone

The mineral composition is Eocene subaerial adakitic lava and lava breccia. Dikes of similar composition exist in the Blue Hills near Bremerton 60 km away, both thought to be created by subduction of the Kula-Farallon Ridge beneath North America. They may be related by being part of a magmatic arc, they may be two isolated volcanic centers, or they may have been created at a single center and displaced along a fault (see Puget Sound faults).

== See also ==
- National Register of Historic Places listings in Jefferson County, Washington
- Recognition of Native American sacred sites in the United States
