= Skystone =

Boulder in Washington, United States

- Glacial erratic rock
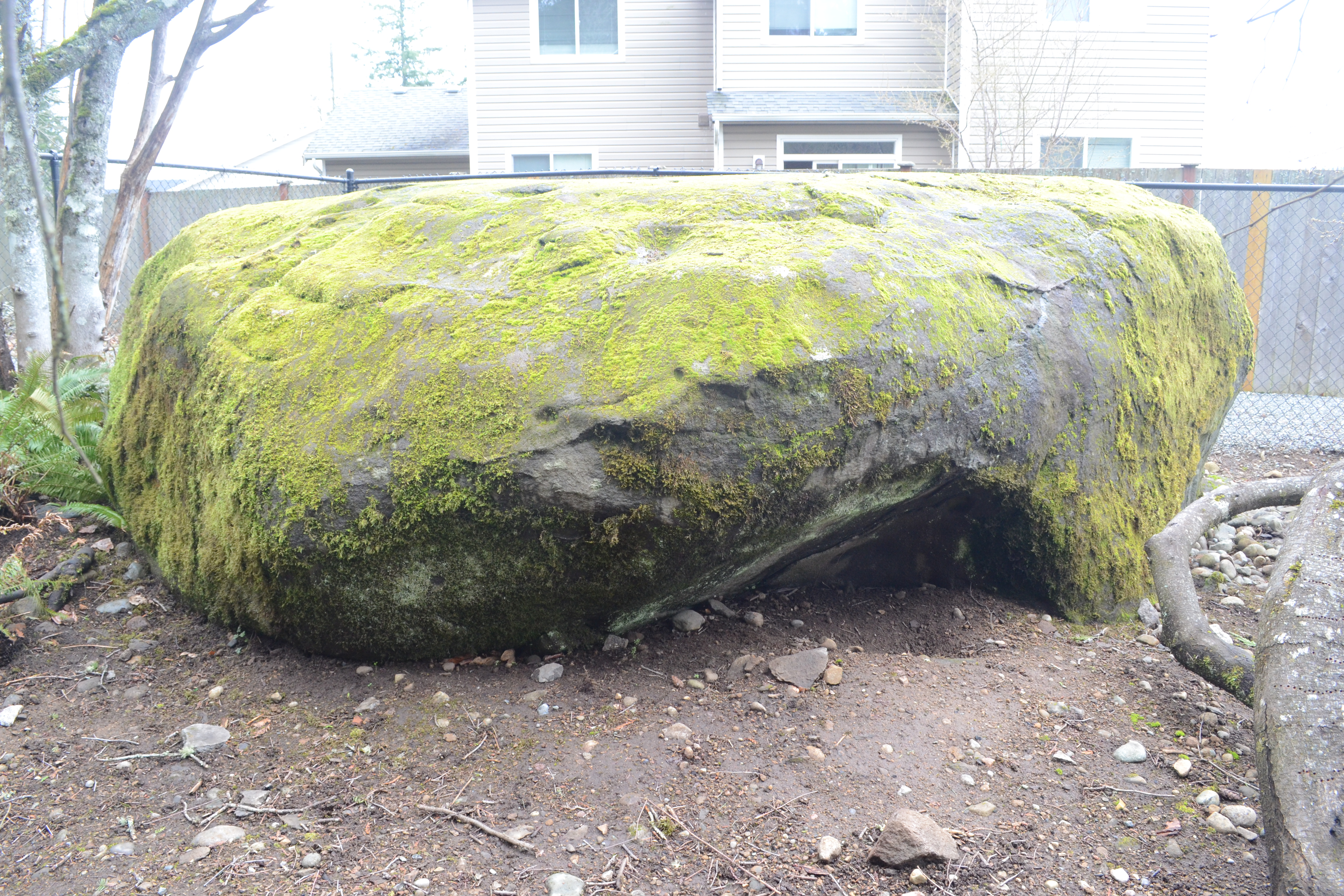
- Coordinates: 47.153807°N 122.194685°W

Composition
- Andesite

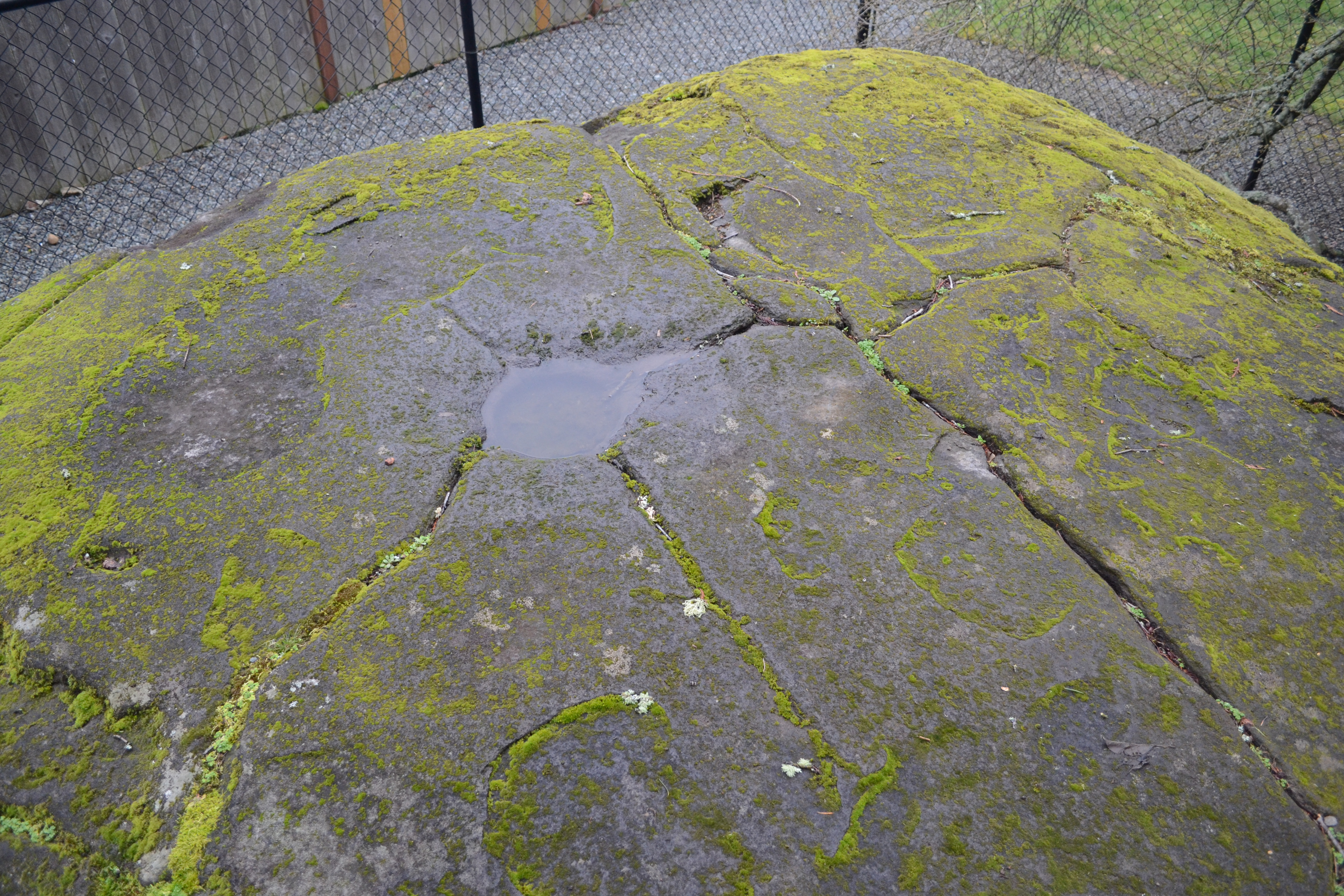
Large pit on Skystone

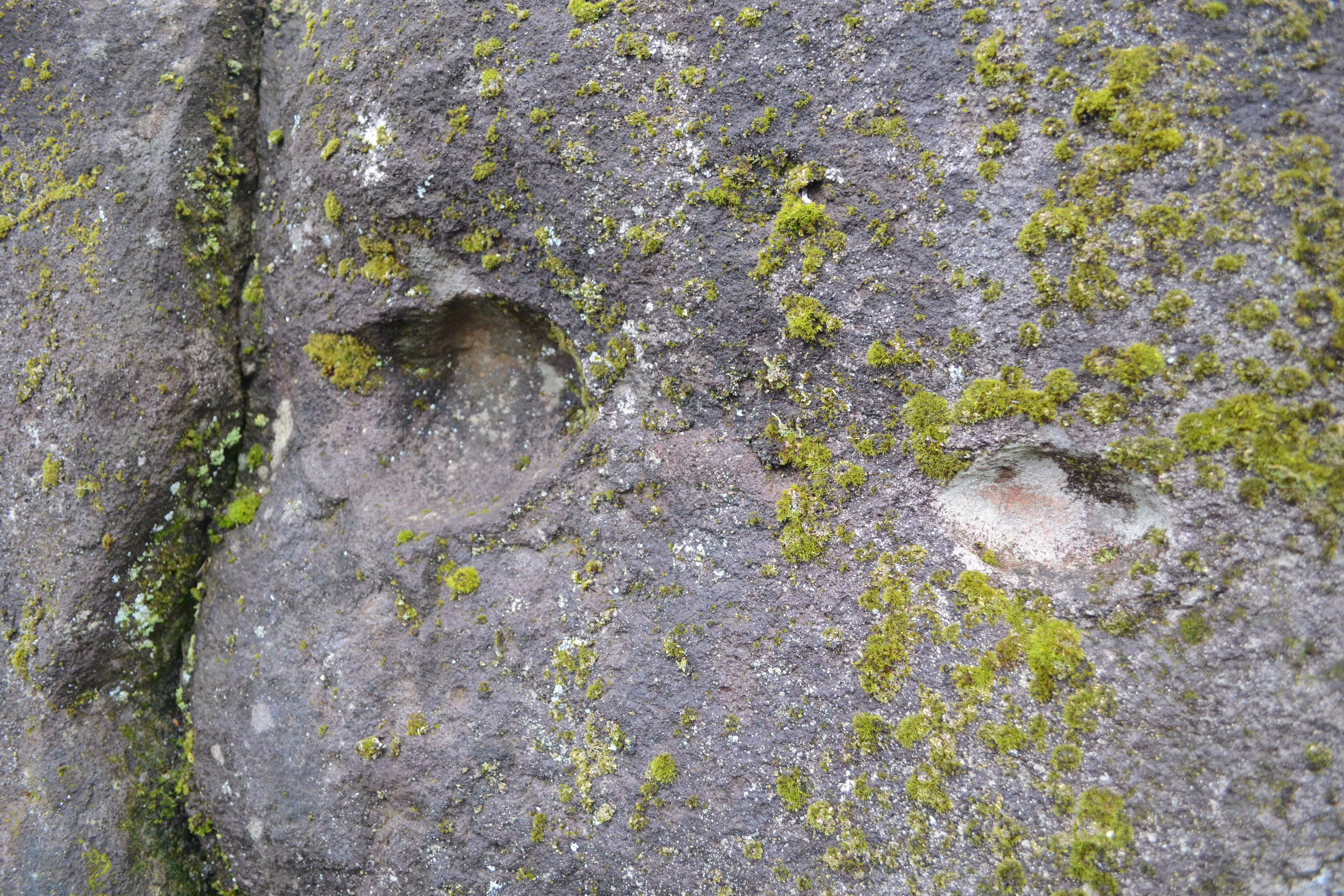
Smaller pits on the Skystone

The Skystone is an andesite glacial erratic boulder in Bonney Lake, Washington. The boulder was deposited approximately 13,000 years ago. The stone's height and width are 4.5 by 12 feet (1.4 m × 3.7 m).

== Uses ==
The stone may have astronomical significance to the Puyallup tribe of Native Americans. It has over 20 pits pounded into its surface that appear to be man-made. The holes seem to point towards both astronomical and geographic features. The holes point in the direction of Polaris, Sirius, the Little Dipper, and Orion. The stone may have also been used to predict lunar standstills. Some of the holes align with the sun's position on the solstices, which may have allowed Native Americans to predict the changing of seasons. Pits in the surface of the boulder also appear to point towards Mt. Rainier, the peak of Mt. St. Helens (before it erupted), and potentially Mt. Adams, all of which have significance for local Native tribes.

The stone is about one mile south of the former Naches Trail, and was apparently rediscovered when a suburban housing development was begun in 1999. It is listed and preserved as an archaeological site by the Washington State Office of Archaeology and Historic Preservation.

== See also ==
- List of individual rocks
- Viking Altar Rock, a Minnesota erratic with pits drilled in its upper surface
