= Lake Lawrence erratic =

Boulder in Thurston County, Washington

Coordinates: 46.86507°N 122.57904°W

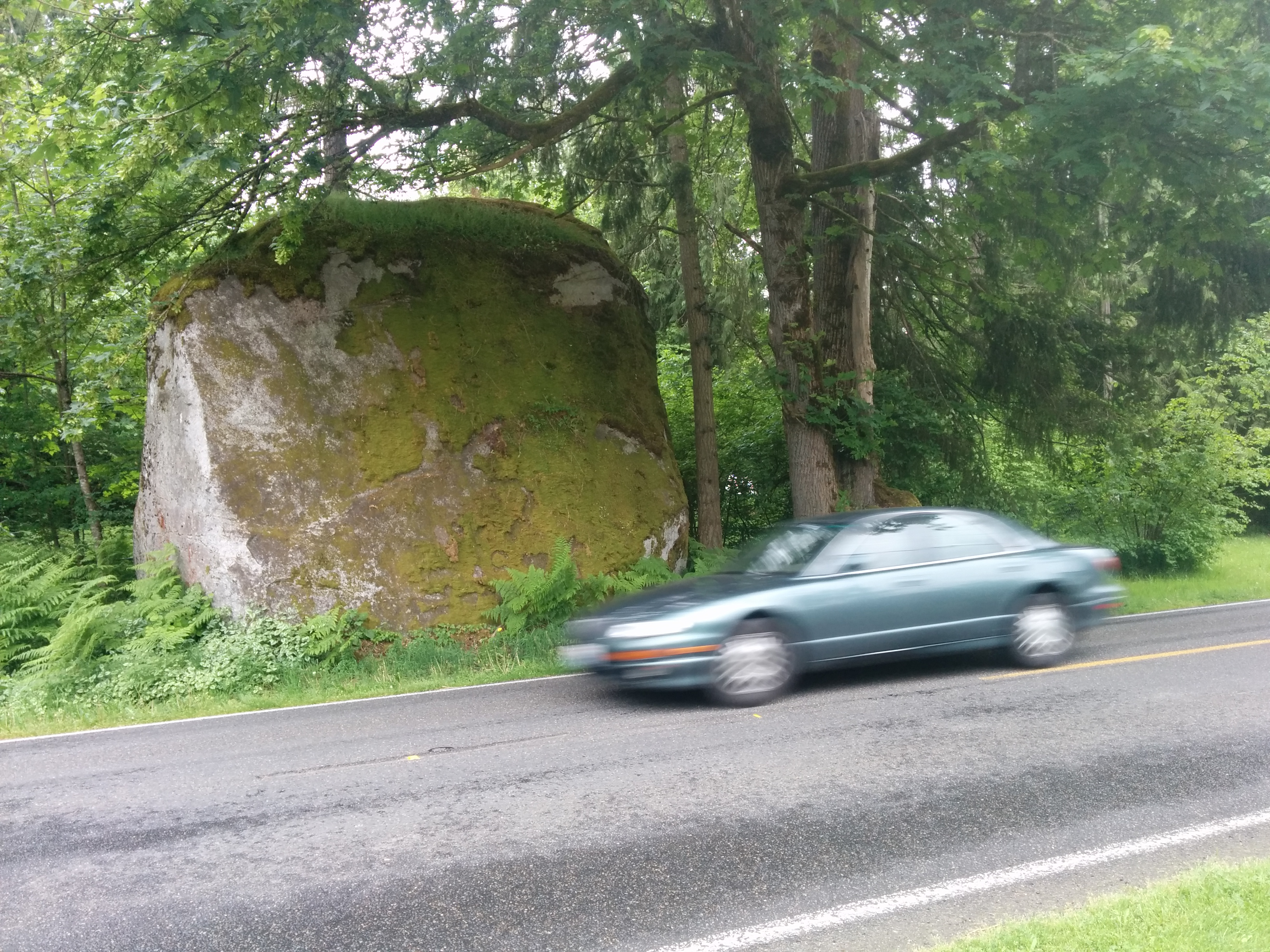
Lawrence Lake erratic

The Lawrence Lake erratic is a glacial erratic boulder near Lake Lawrence in Thurston County, Washington. The boulder is about 15 feet (4.6 m) tall. Lake Lawrence itself was formed when the Vashon Glaciation created most of the topography seen in the Puget Sound region. The erratic is one of the southernmost in the Puget Sound region, near the limit of the Yelm lobe of the Vashon Glacier in the Rainier area.

== See also ==
- List of geographic features in Thurston County, Washington
- List of individual rocks
