= Senior rock =

Graduating class tradition

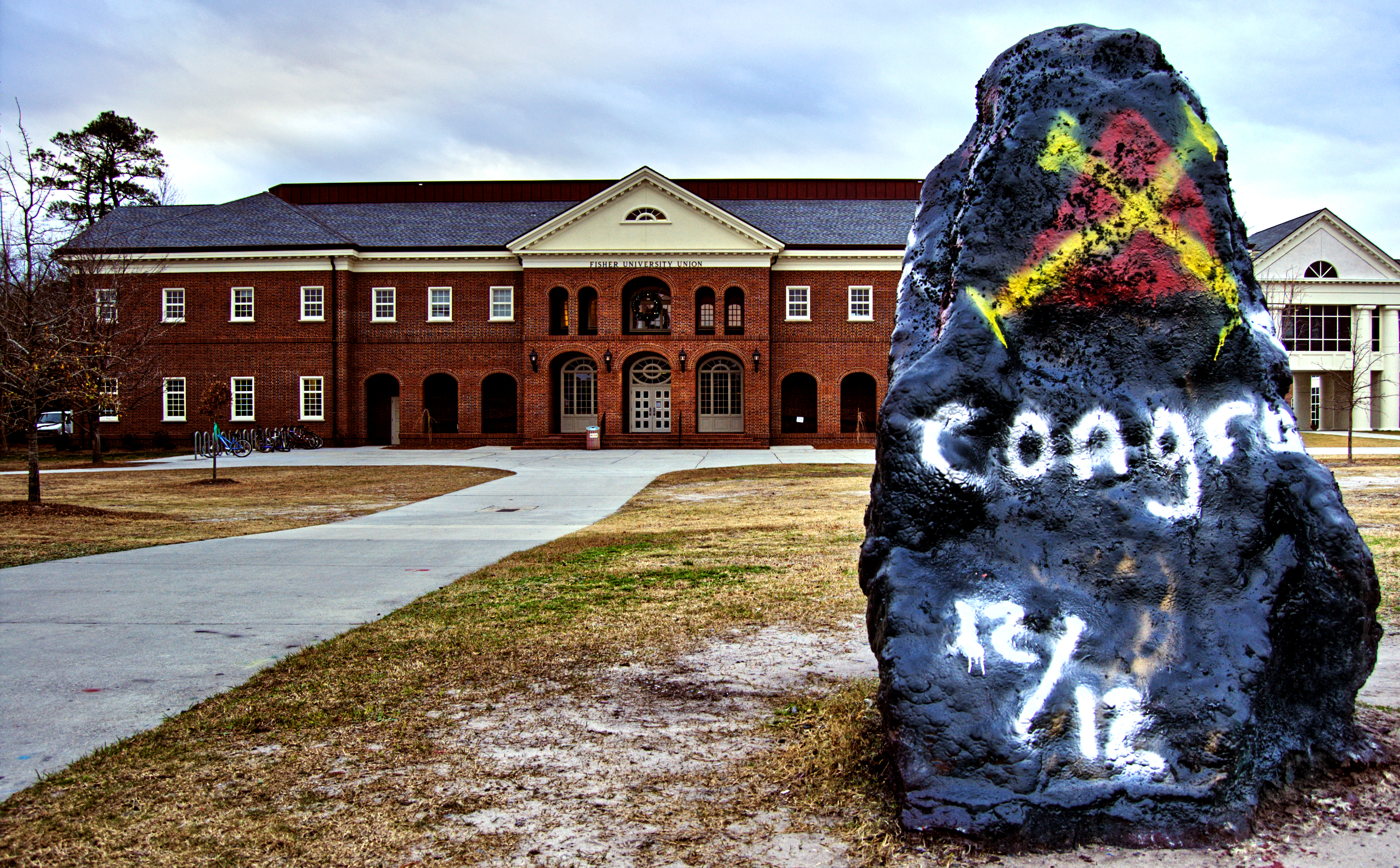
A "spirit rock" at University of North Carolina at Wilmington

The senior rock (also called spirit rock) is a rural and suburban United States tradition in which youth, often a high school senior class, paint a prominent local rock with class colors, graduating year, or names of the members of the class. A rock at Northwestern University is said to have "inches of paint after 80 years of the tradition". The tradition may have started in the 1950s or 1960s at universities and high schools.

Rocks are usually indigenous but they can be delivered to the school as a specifically designated senior rock. In at least one case a rock has been donated from one graduating class to a following class of seniors. A senior rock at Olympia High School was "dumped" from a local quarry after another one had been removed.

Council Rock High School North in Bucks County, Pennsylvania, is named for a rock which is frequently painted.

== See also ==
- Rock art
