= Ehalkivi =

Biggest glacial boulder in Estonia

- Glacial erratic
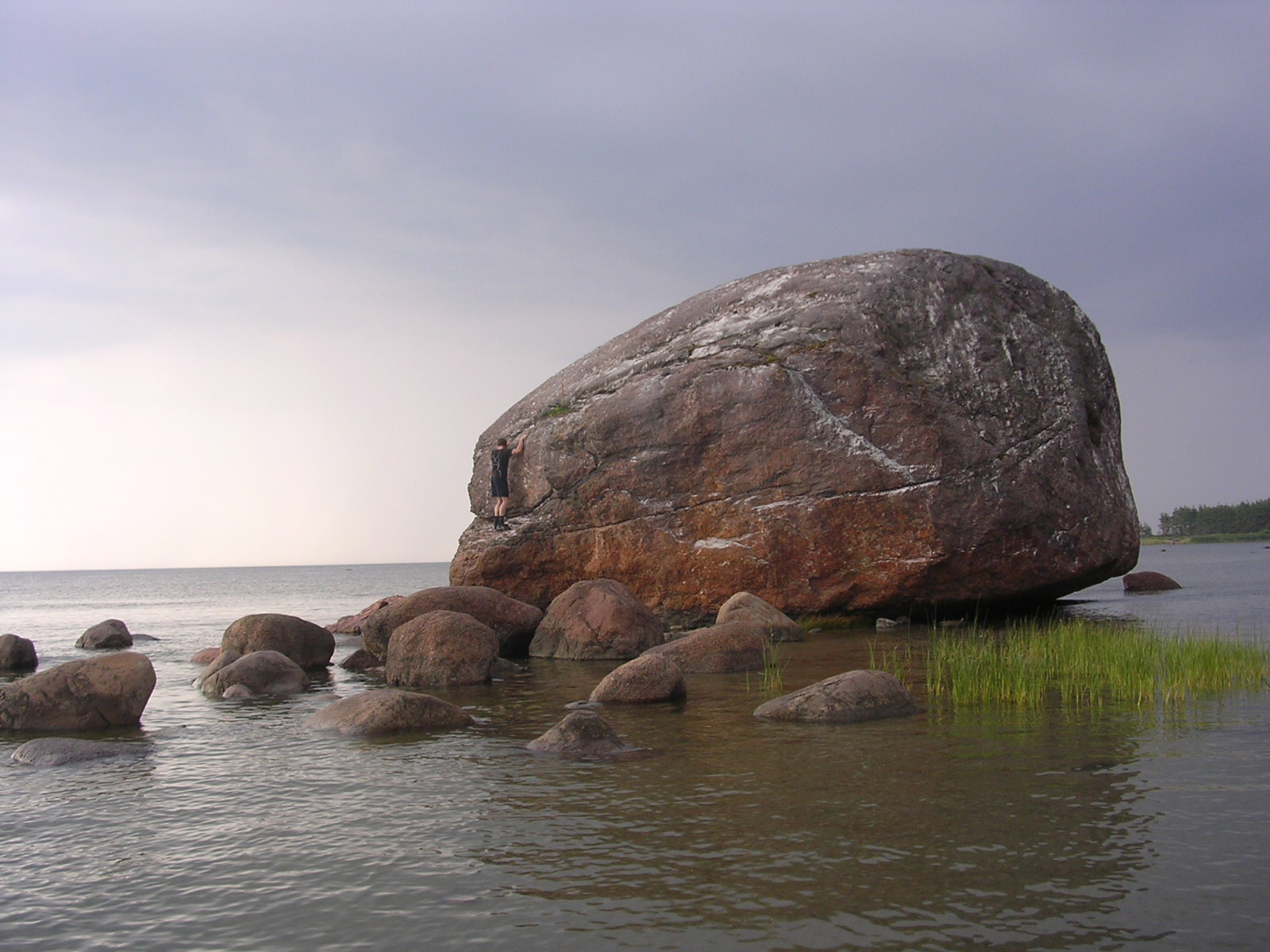

- Location within Estonia
- Coordinates: 59.5498°N 26.5876°E
- Location: Near Letipea
- Formed by: pegmatite
- Geology: glacial erratic

Ehalkivi (lit. 'Sunset Glow Boulder') is an erratic boulder in Letipea, Lääne-Viru County, Estonia; for its volume is the largest of its kind in Estonia, and one of the largest of its kind in the glaciation area of North Europe.

Geologically the boulder had originally formed as a pegmatite-type intrusive magmatic rock.

== Dimensions ==
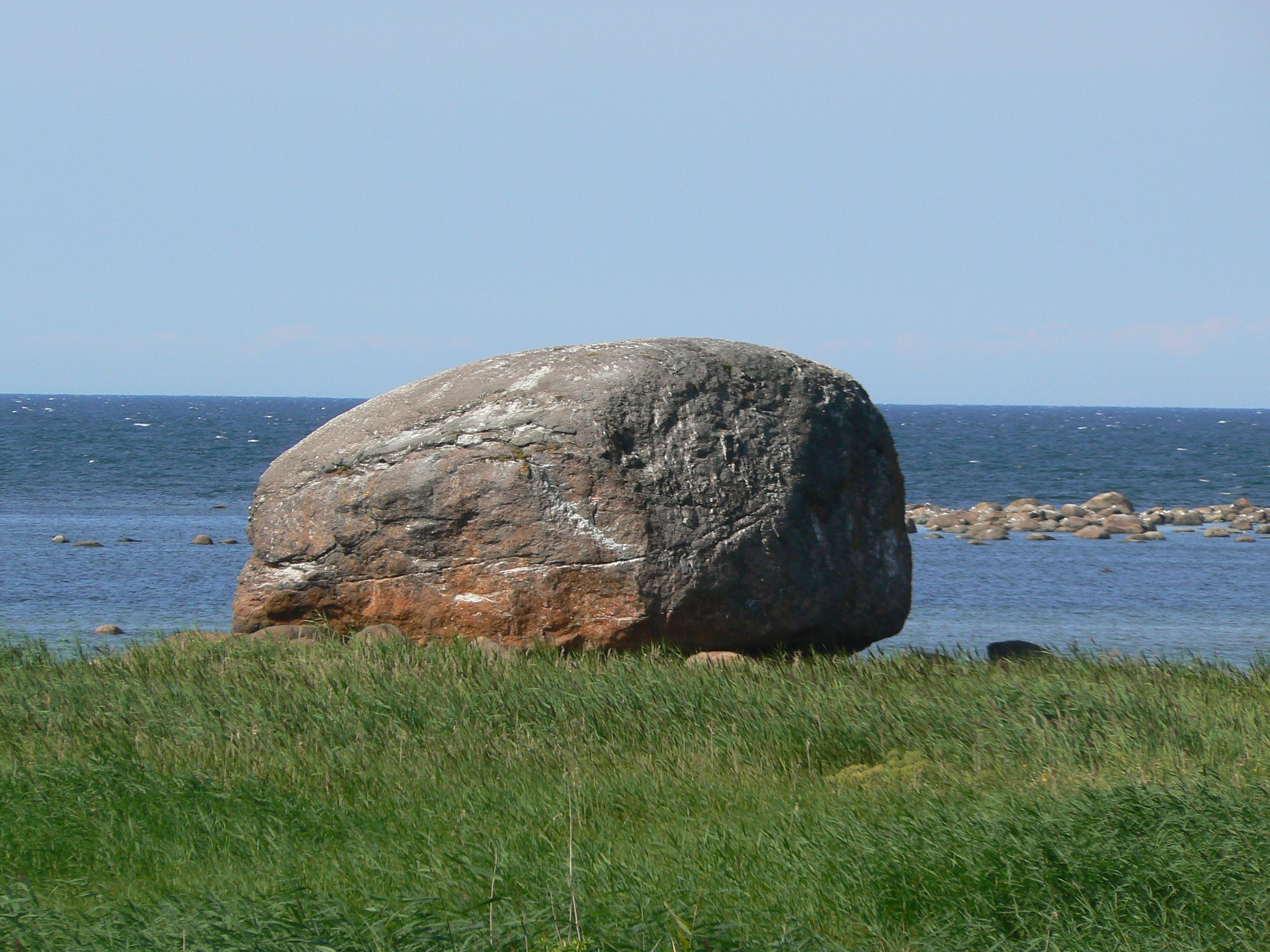
View from the shore

- Height: 7.6 m
- Circumference: 49.6 (measured at 1.5 m from water surface)
- Volume: 930 m^{3}
- Mass: ca 2,500 t
