= Shriek =

Shriek may refer to:

- Screaming, a loud vocalization
- Exclamation mark, in some computing and mathematical contexts
  - Shriek map, in category theory, a type of unusual functor
- Shriek (album) or the title song, by Wye Oak, 2014
- "Shriek" (Batman Beyond), a television episode
  - Shriek (Batman Beyond character), the namesake character introduced in the episode
- Shriek (character), a Marvel Comics character
- Shriek: An Afterword, a 2006 novel by Jeff VanderMeer
- Shriek, in the Dragon Age media franchise, a type of Darkspawn creature
- Shriek DuBois, a character in the TV series CatDog
- The Shriek, a 1933 American animated short film
- Shriek, main antagonist of Ori and the Will of the Wisps

== See also ==
- Shrieker (disambiguation)
- Shrek (disambiguation)
