= Schreck =

Schreck is a surname. Notable people with the surname include:

- David Schreck, Canadian politician and pundit
- Gustav Schreck (1849–1918), German composer
- Julius Schreck (1898–1936), early Nazi Party member
- Johann Schreck (1576–1630), German Jesuit missionary to China
- Mason Schreck (born 1993), American football player
- Max Schreck (1879–1936), German actor
- Nikolas Schreck (born 1958 or 1959), American musician
- Ossee Schreckengost (1875–1914), American baseball player, also known as Ossee Schreck
- Sam Schreck (born 1999), German football player
- Stephan Schreck (born 1978), German road bicycle racer
- Zeena Schreck (born 1963), American artist

== Other ==
- Schreck Ensemble, a Dutch new music ensemble
- Franco-British Aviation (Schreck FBA), a French aircraft company specializing in flying boats
- Glacial erratic in Sulechów, also known as Schreck's Stone, a granite glacial erratic stone in Poland
- Agent Schreck, a fictional character in Final Destination (film)

== See also ==
- Shrek (disambiguation)
- Shreck (disambiguation)
- Schrecker, a surname
