= Clonfinlough Stone =

- Cloch Chluain Fionnlocha (Irish)
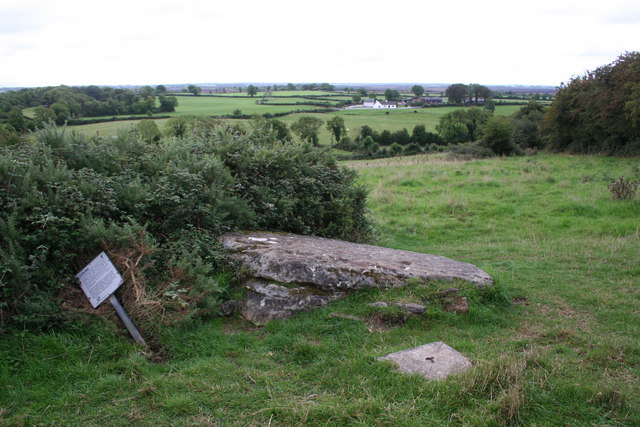

- Location within Ireland
- 53.317058°N 7.936997°W
- Type: Rock art
- Location: Clonfinlough, Clonmacnoise, County Offaly, Ireland

History
- Built: Bronze Age

National monument of Ireland
- Official name: Clonfinlough
- Reference no.: 336

The Clonfinlough Stone is a piece of rock art and National Monument located near Kinnitty, County Offaly, Ireland.

== Location ==
The carved stone at Clonfinlough is located on the southern slope of the western end of Esker Hill, about 4 km (2 1/2 miles) east of Clonmacnoise, south of Mongan Bog and on the east bank of the River Shannon.

== History ==
The carvings on the stone are believed to date back to the Bronze Age (2500–500 BC). A settlement excavated nearby consisted of a large palisaded enclosure containing circular houses.

However, recent studies have noted the similarity between the carvings and some found in Galicia, Spain. Clonmacnoise was connected into the medieval pilgrimage Camino de Santiago. This stone may have therefore been a stopping point for traveling pilgrims, and so suggests that the carvings, or some of them, could be by Christian pilgrims in the 13th–14th century.

== Description ==
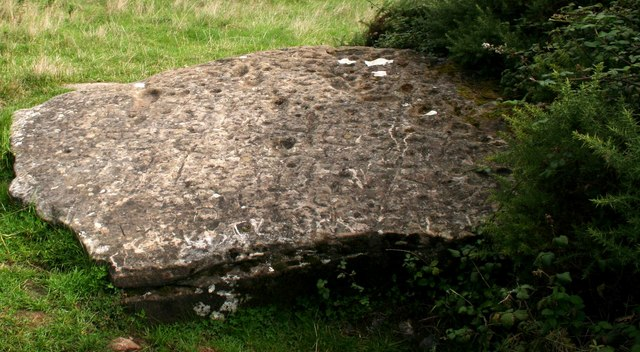
View of the stone

The stone is a glacial erratic of Carboniferous Limestone and lies flat on the ground, measures 3 metres (9.8 ft) by 2.45 metres (8.0 ft) by 0.75 metres (2.5 ft) and weighs about 14 tonnes. Marks incised in it include crosses, cup-marks, the "split-year sign" (a circle divided in two), the letters DOD, and three impressions of feet.
