= Schrecker =

Schrecker or Schreker is a surname. Notable people with the surname include:

- Al Schrecker (1917–2000), American basketball player
- Ellen Schrecker (born 1938), American historian
- Franz Schreker (originally Schrecker; 1878–1934), Austrian composer, conductor, teacher and administrator
- Frederick Schrecker (1892–1976), Austrian actor

== See also ==
- Schreck (disambiguation)
