= Shreck =

Shreck may refer to:

- Charlie Shreck (born 1978), English cricketer

== Fictional characters ==
- Shreck, the previous name of "Terror" from the comic book Terror Inc.
- Max Shreck, a Batman character
- Charles "Chip" Shreck, a Batman character from the film Batman Returns

== See also ==
- Shrek (disambiguation)
- Schreck (disambiguation)
