= Letipea massacre =

1976 mass shooting in Soviet Estonia

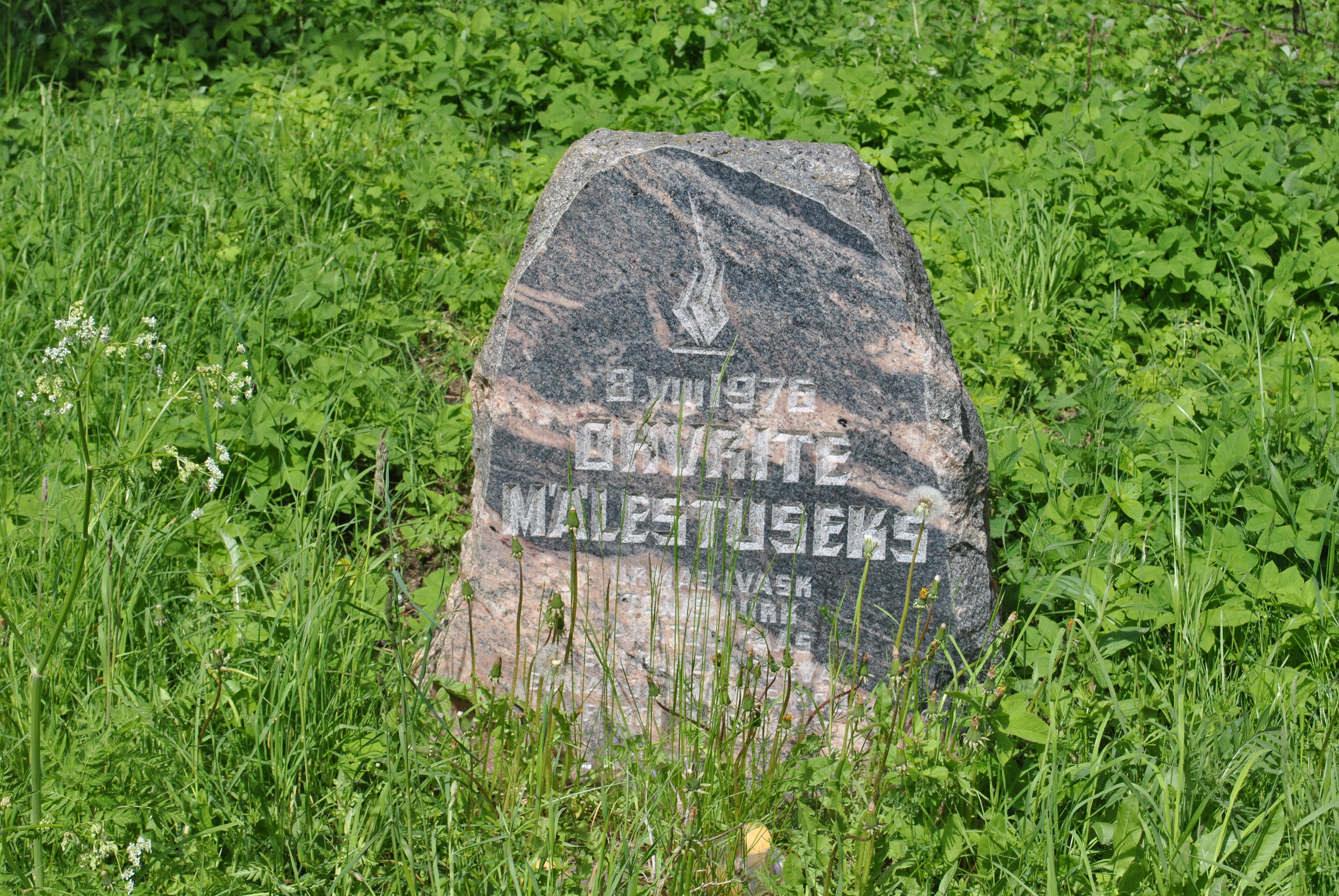
- Memorial stone of Letipea massacre.
- Location: 59°32′42″N 26°38′49″E; Letipea, Estonia, (then Soviet Union)
- Date: 8 August 1976 (UTC+2)
- Attack type: Mass shooting, mass murder, murder–suicide
- Deaths: 7-8 (including the perpetrator)
- Injuries: 18
- Perpetrator: Private Viktor Bagižev

The Letipea massacre was a mass shooting of civilians by a Soviet border guard that took place on 8 August 1976 in Letipea, Estonia, at the time part of the USSR.

The resulting massacre occurred at Letipea during the annual summer gathering of gas company workers which amassed 344 people. A conflict between the gatherers and two drunken Soviet border guards, Viktor Bagizev and Nikolai Povyshev, prompted Bagizev to open fire at approximately 1:30am with an assault rifle which killed 6 gatherers and wounded 18. In addition, Povyshev was shot while he attempted to intervene; he later died at the hospital. Reports vary whether Bagizev committed suicide by shooting himself in the face or was killed by one of the gatherers with his own rifle. The commander of the border guard unit, who took responsibility, reportedly also committed suicide.

== Memorial ==
A memorial stone was erected for the victims of the massacre in 1991 and the names of those who died were added in 1996.
