= Shrieker =

Shrieker may refer to:

== Fictional animals ==
- Shrieker (Dungeons & Dragons), a fictional creature which appears in the Dungeons & Dragons role-playing games
- Shrieker (Tremors), a fictional prehistoric creature in the Tremors series
- A fictional creature found in Metroid Prime 2: Echoes

== Other uses ==
- Shrieker (film), 1998 horror film

== See also ==
- Shriek (disambiguation)
