= Letipea Landscape Conservation Area =

Protected area in Estonia

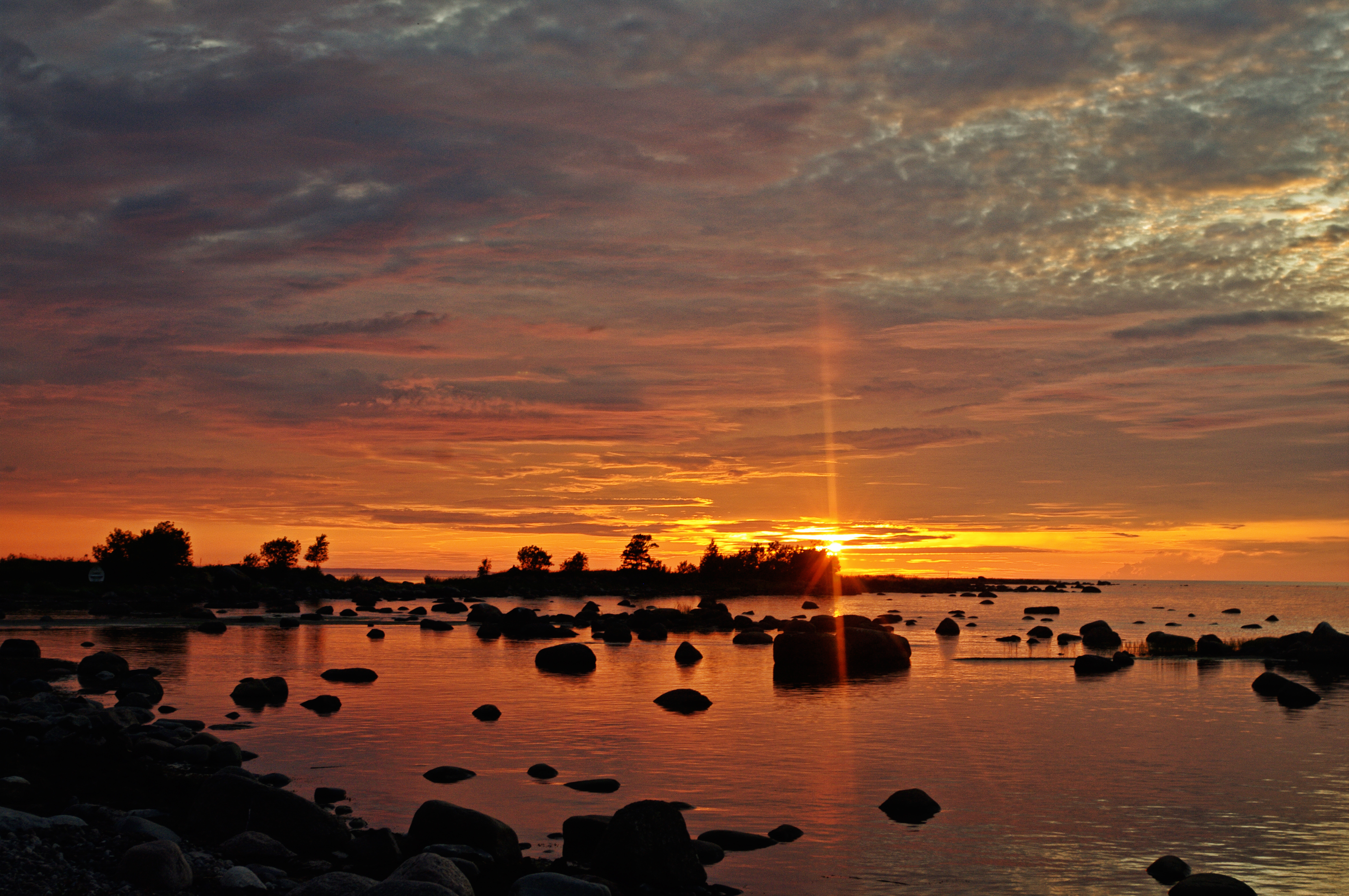

- Location within Estonia
- Location: Estonia
- Coordinates: 59°33′00″N 26°35′30″E
- Area: 609 ha (1,500 acres)
- Established: 1992 (2000)

Letipea Landscape Conservation Area is a nature park is located in Lääne-Viru County, Estonia.

Its area is 609 ha.

The protected area was founded in 1992 as a Letipea bird conservation area. In 2000, the protected area was designated to the landscape conservation area.
