= Shrek (disambiguation) =

Shrek is a 2001 film from DreamWorks Animation.

Shrek may also refer to:

== Shrek franchise topics ==
- Shrek (franchise) , a media franchise
  - Shrek!, a children's book on which the franchise is loosely based
  - Shrek (character), protagonist of the book and the film series
  - Shrek the Musical, a 2008 Broadway musical based on the first film in the series
  - Shrek 4-D, a 4D film screened at various theme parks
  - Shrek (video game)
  - Shrek (soundtrack), from the first film
  - Shrek (score), from the first film

== Other ==
- Shrek (album), by Marc Ribot and its title track
- Shrek (sheep), runaway sheep in New Zealand, named after the fictional character
- Shrek, a nickname of South African golfer Louis Oosthuizen
- Markook shrek, a Middle Eastern flatbread

== See also ==
- Shreck (disambiguation)
- Schreck (disambiguation)
