= Glacial erratic in Sulechów =

Specific boulder in Poland

Glacial erratic
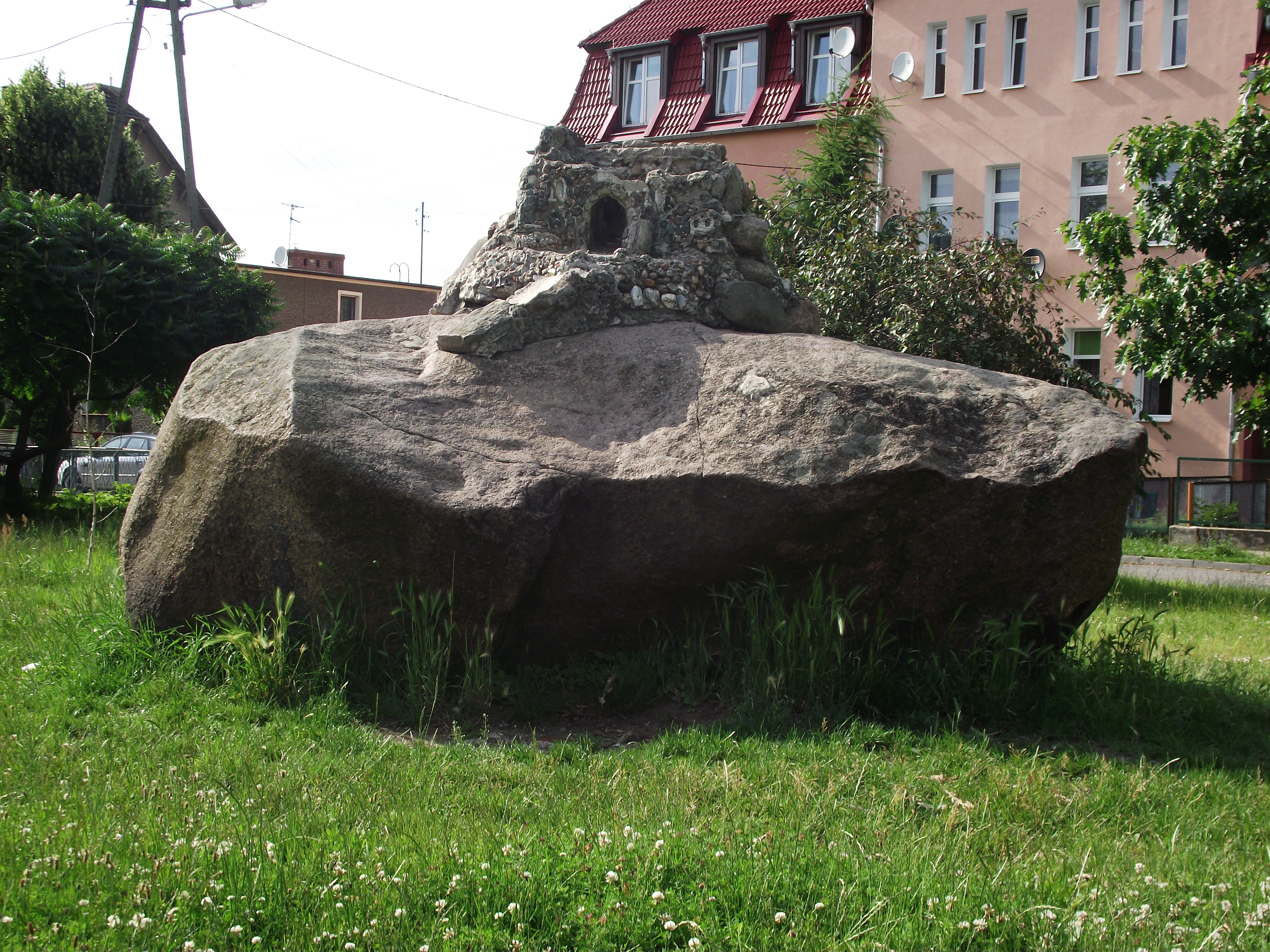
- Glacial erratic on Wojska Polskiego Street in Sulechów
- Interactive map of Glacial erratic
- Location: Sulechów, Poland
- Coordinates: 52°05′40.949″N 15°37′35.346″E
- Type: natural monument
- Height: 165 cm (65 in)
- Opening date: May 19, 2006

Glacial erratic in Sulechów, sometimes also called Schreck's Stone, is a granite glacial erratic located on a small square between Wojska Polskiego and Zielona streets in Sulechów. By decision of the Lubusz Voivode No. 29 of 19 May 2006, the boulder was designated as a natural monument.

The glacial erratic on Wojska Polskiego Street in Sulechów is one of 102 natural monuments located in Gmina Sulechów, and one of 14 such objects in the town (it is also the only glacial erratic in the town that has been recognized as a natural monument).

== Characteristics ==
The glacial erratic is located on the small square at the junction of Wojska Polskiego and Zielona streets on plot number 464 in Sulechów. It has a circumference of 1,120 centimeters and a height of 165 centimeters, making it the second-largest boulder in the municipality. The erratic is made of medium-grained pink granite. Its mineral composition includes transparent quartz, light gray feldspar, isometric crystals, and small amounts of biotite flakes.

== History ==
The first written mention of the boulder appeared in the town chronicle from 1756. Initially, it was located on the northern section of the present-day Brzozowa Street in Sulechów. In 1938, aiming to improve the aesthetics of the town, particularly the area near military buildings, the authorities decided to relocate the boulder closer to the Sulechów barracks. To move the erratic, four wooden runners (with a cross section of 30 × 30 cm) were constructed, which slid on metal rollers with a diameter of 6 cm. Four winches were brought in to load the boulder, each with a working load limit of around 10 tons. During the lifting of the stone, its weight was measured at approximately 650 hundredweights. One machine and two tracked tractors were used for the movement, and wooden logs were placed under the metal rollers to facilitate the shifting of the boulder. In total, it was moved approximately 500 meters and placed on the square where it currently resides.

In the 1970s, a miniature castle with a defensive wall, constructed from pebbles, was added to the top of the boulder. The creators intended it to decorate the erratic and its design was meant to resemble a building from the legendary era of Schreck.

The legal basis for the protection of the boulder as a natural monument is the decision of the Lubusz Voivode, Marek Ast, numbered 29, dated 19 May 2006.

== Legend ==
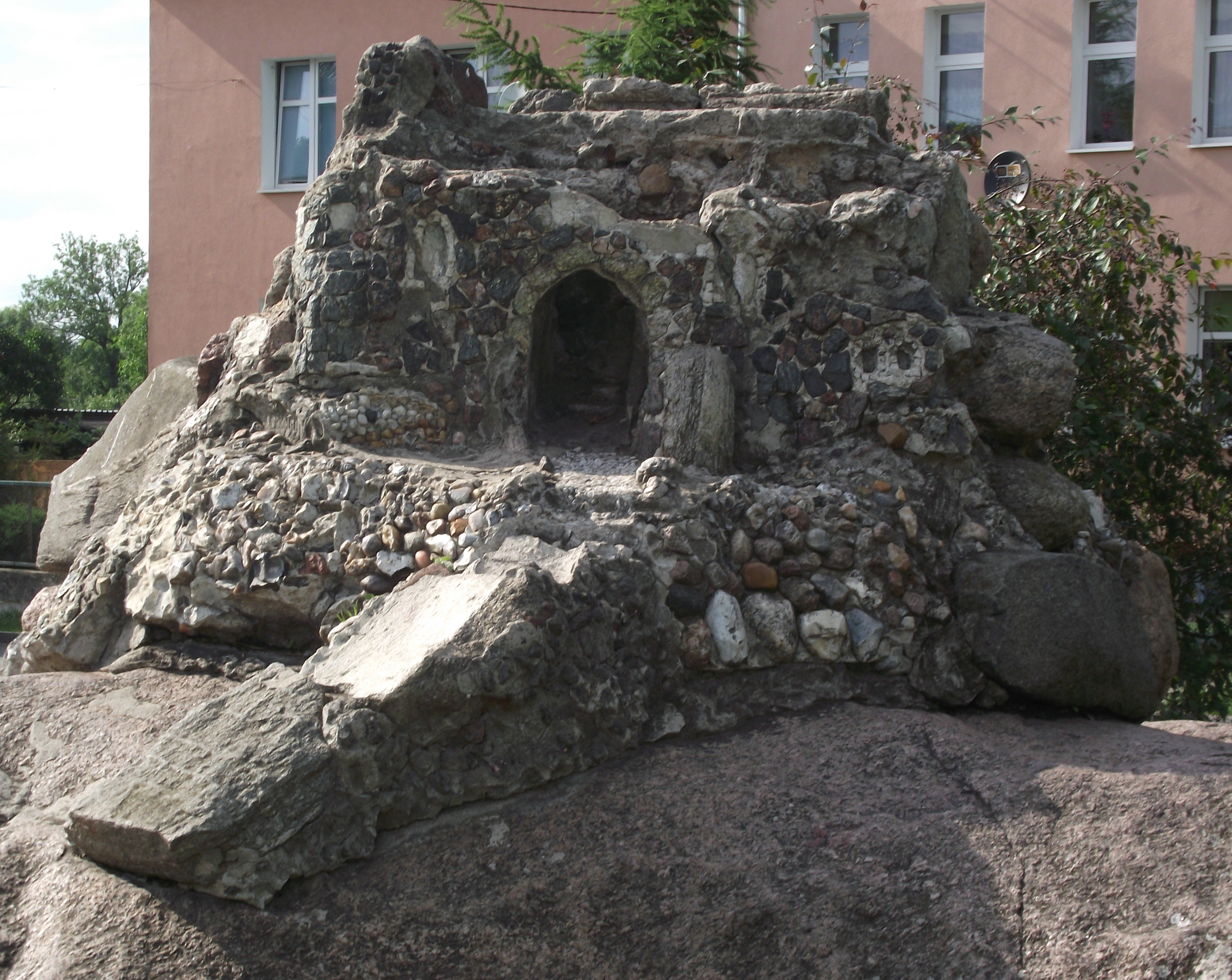
Miniature castle added to the top of the boulder in the 1970s

The boulder is associated with a legend about its origin and initial location, which was published in 1926 in the work Abriss zur Heimatkunde des Kreises Züllichau – Schwiebus by Gustav Zerndt. The legend tells of a giant named Schreck, who once inhabited the areas near Sulechów. Schreck is said to have carried the boulder in his shoe for a long time, until one day, during a walk, he noticed it was causing him discomfort. At that moment, he took off his shoe and shook out the stone, which landed on the northern section of the present-day Brzozowa Street in Sulechów. This tale gave rise to the boulder's unofficial name – "Schreck's Stone".
