= Letipea =

Village in Estonia

- Village
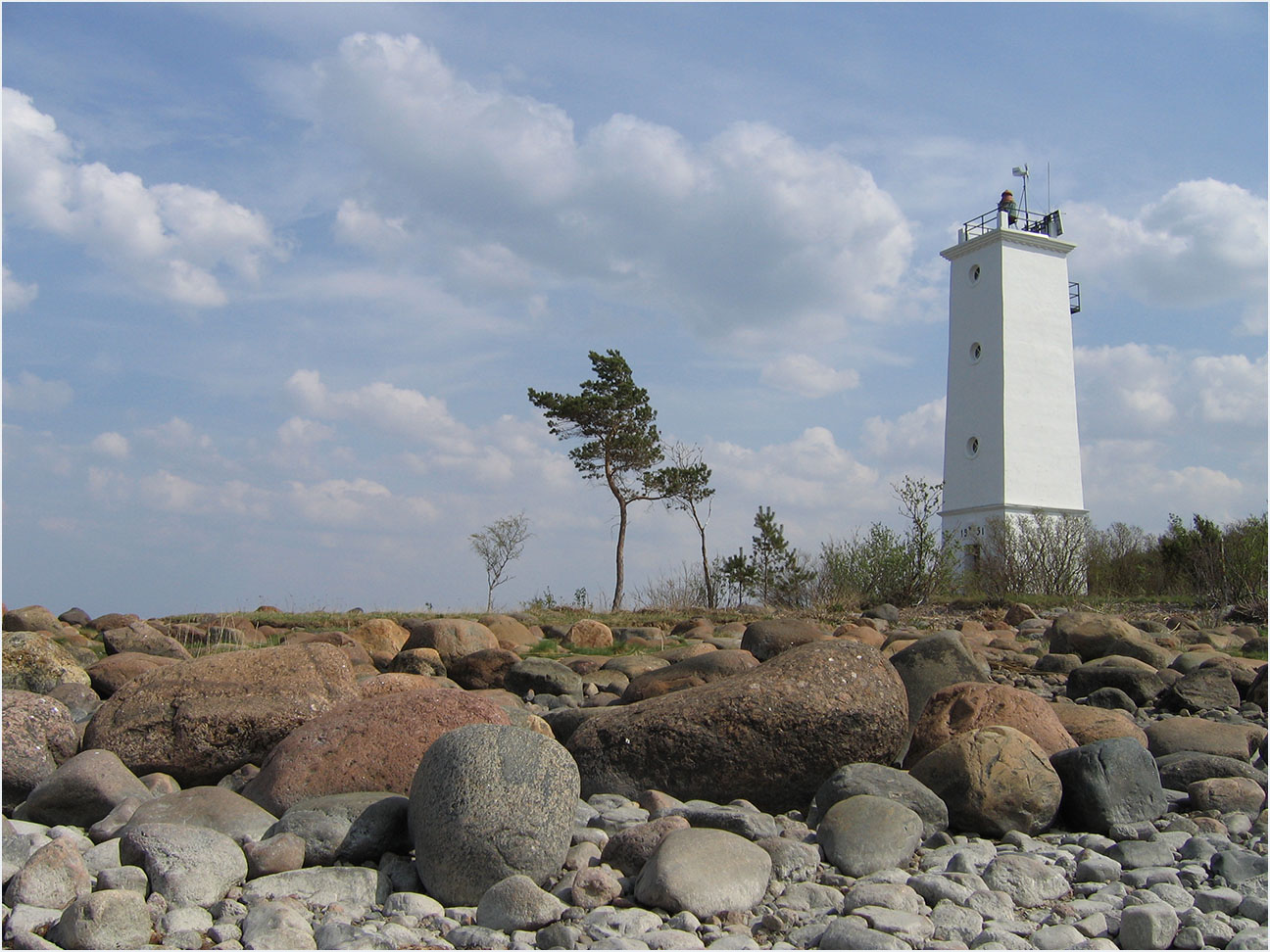
- Letipea lighthouse

- Location in Estonia
- Coordinates: 59°32′50″N 26°35′56″E
- Country: Estonia
- County: Lääne-Viru County
- Municipality: Viru-Nigula Parish

Population (2013)
  - Total: 17

Letipea is a village in Viru-Nigula Parish, Lääne-Viru County, northern Estonia. It is located on the Letipea cape (Letipea neem) on the coast of the Gulf of Finland about 6 km northeast of the town of Kunda. Letipea has a population of 17 (as of 1 January 2013).

On 8 August 1976, a conflict between resting workers and drunk Soviet border guards took place in Letipea, resulting in the death of 8 people, with 18 more being injured.

Letipea Landscape Conservation Area (area 608.8 ha) was founded on 30 January 1992. It was proposed by Marek Vahula and others in 3 days, as a bird reserve instead of a building plan of the port of Kunda. Since 2009, it has been a possible location for the Estonian nuclear power station.

== Letipea Ehalkivi ==
Ehalkivi (Sunset Glow Boulder) is Estonia's biggest pegmatite granite boulder, at the tip of the Letipea peninsula. It is the largest erratic boulder in the glaciation region of North Europe. It measures 7 meters in height, a circumference of 48.2 m, a volume of 930 m^{3}, and a mass of approximately 2,500 tonnes.

== Gallery ==
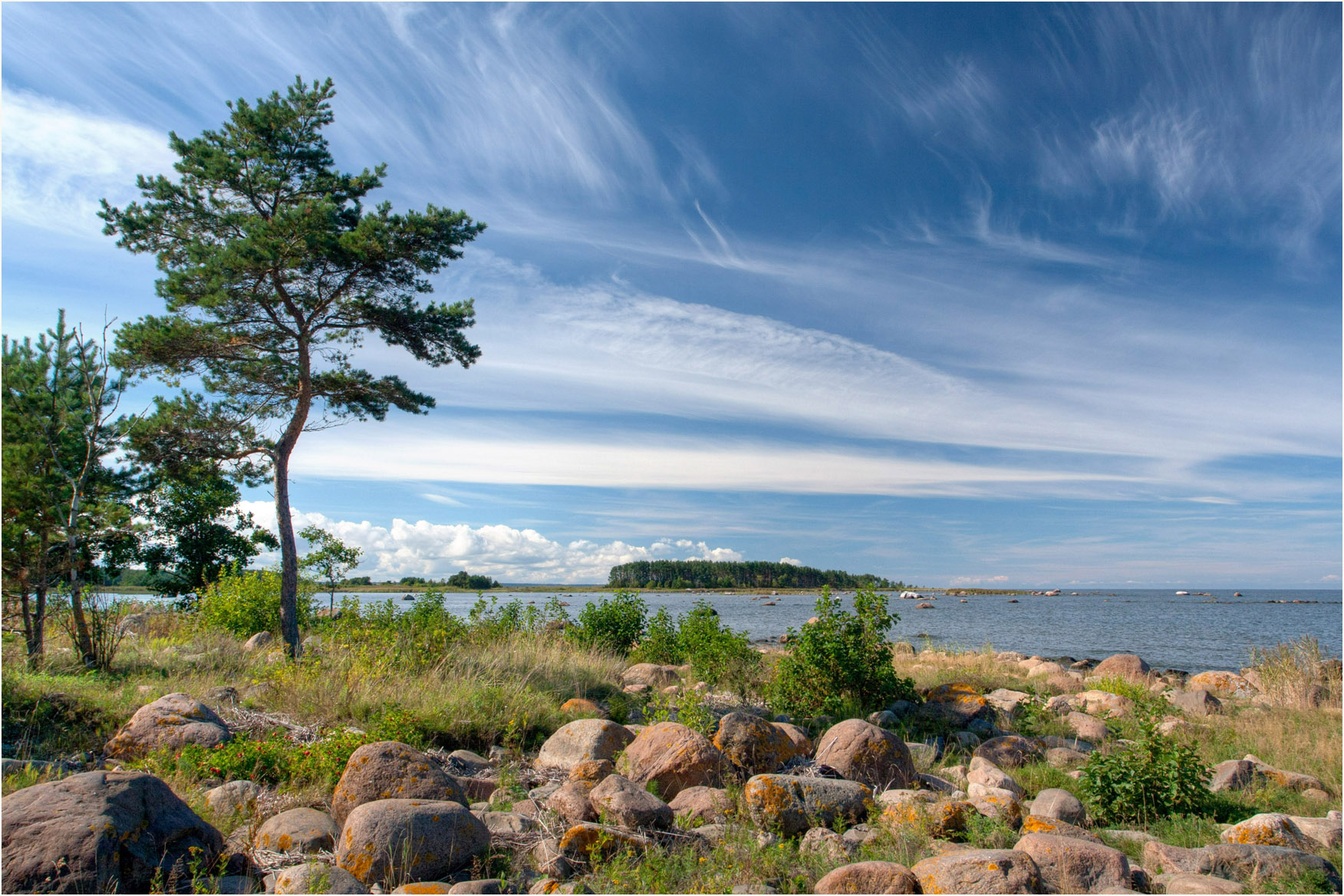
Coast at Letipea

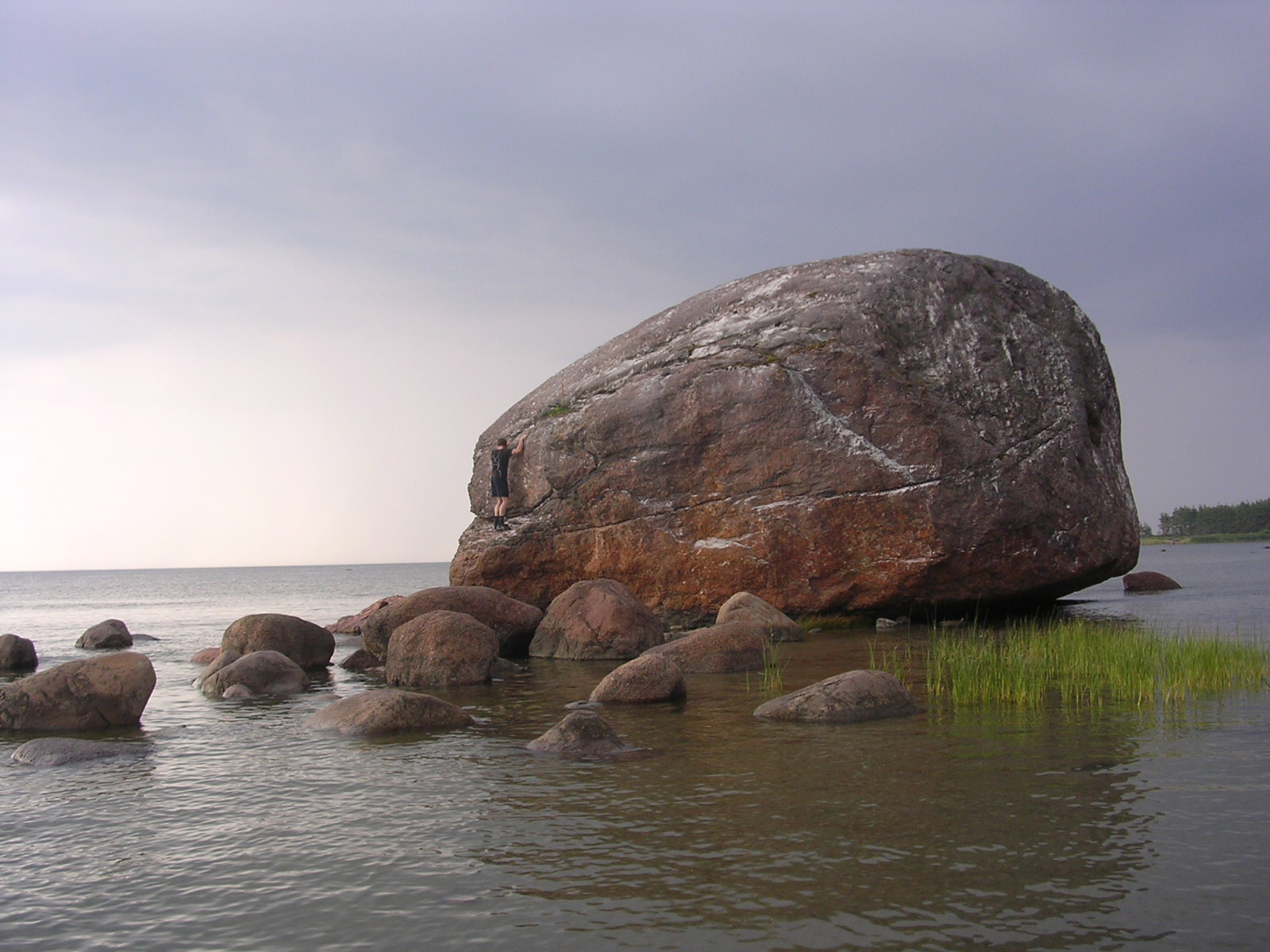
Ehalkivi

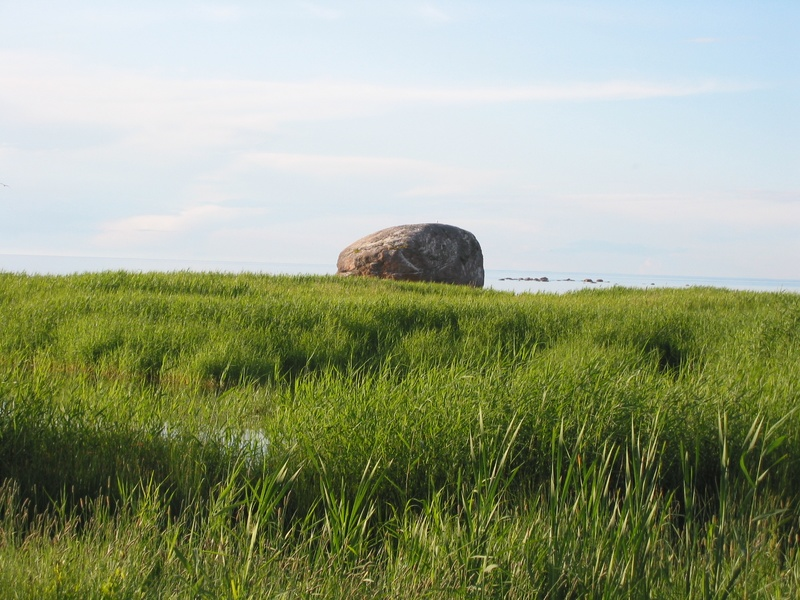
Ehalkivi

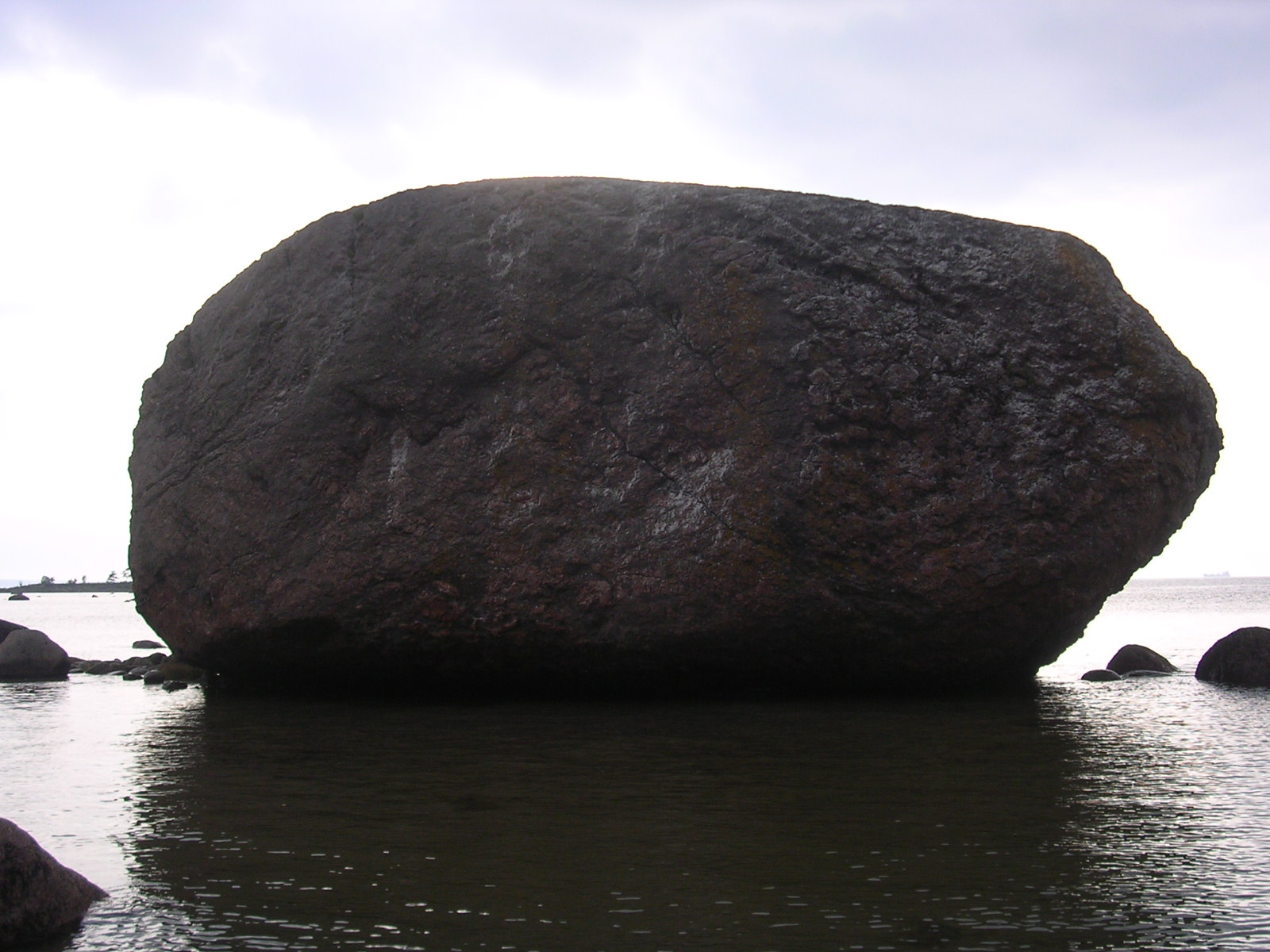
Ehalkivi

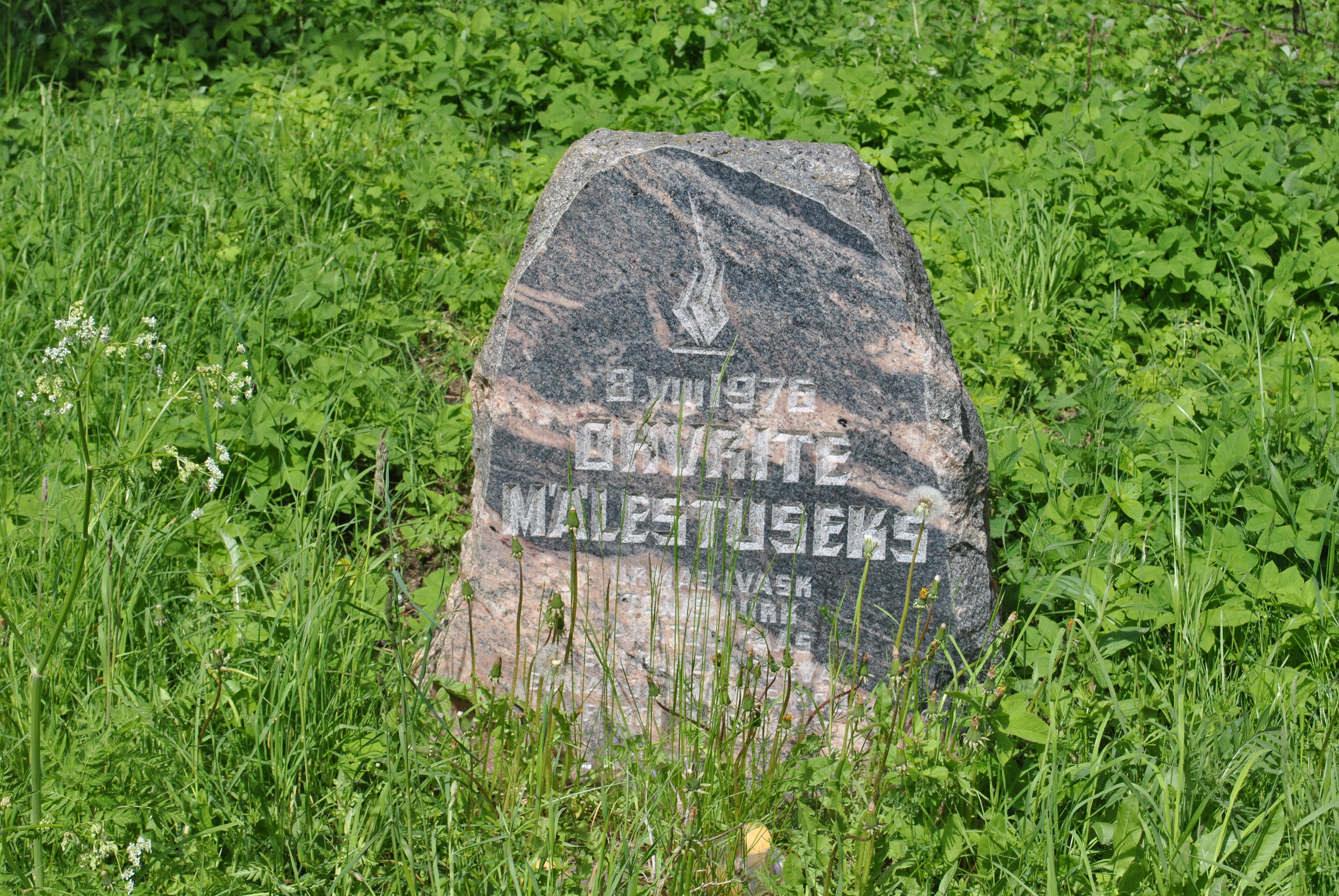
Memorial stone of Letipea massacre.

== See also ==
- Letipea Lighthouse
- Letipea Landscape Conservation Area
- Letipea massacre
