= Pea Patch =

Pea Patch, Peapatch and P-Patch may refer to:

- Peapatch, Virginia
- Peapatch, West Virginia
- Pea Patch Island
- P-Patch, community garden plots in Seattle
