= Picardo Farm =

Community garden in Seattle, Washington, United States

Coordinates: 47.68766°N 122.30048°W

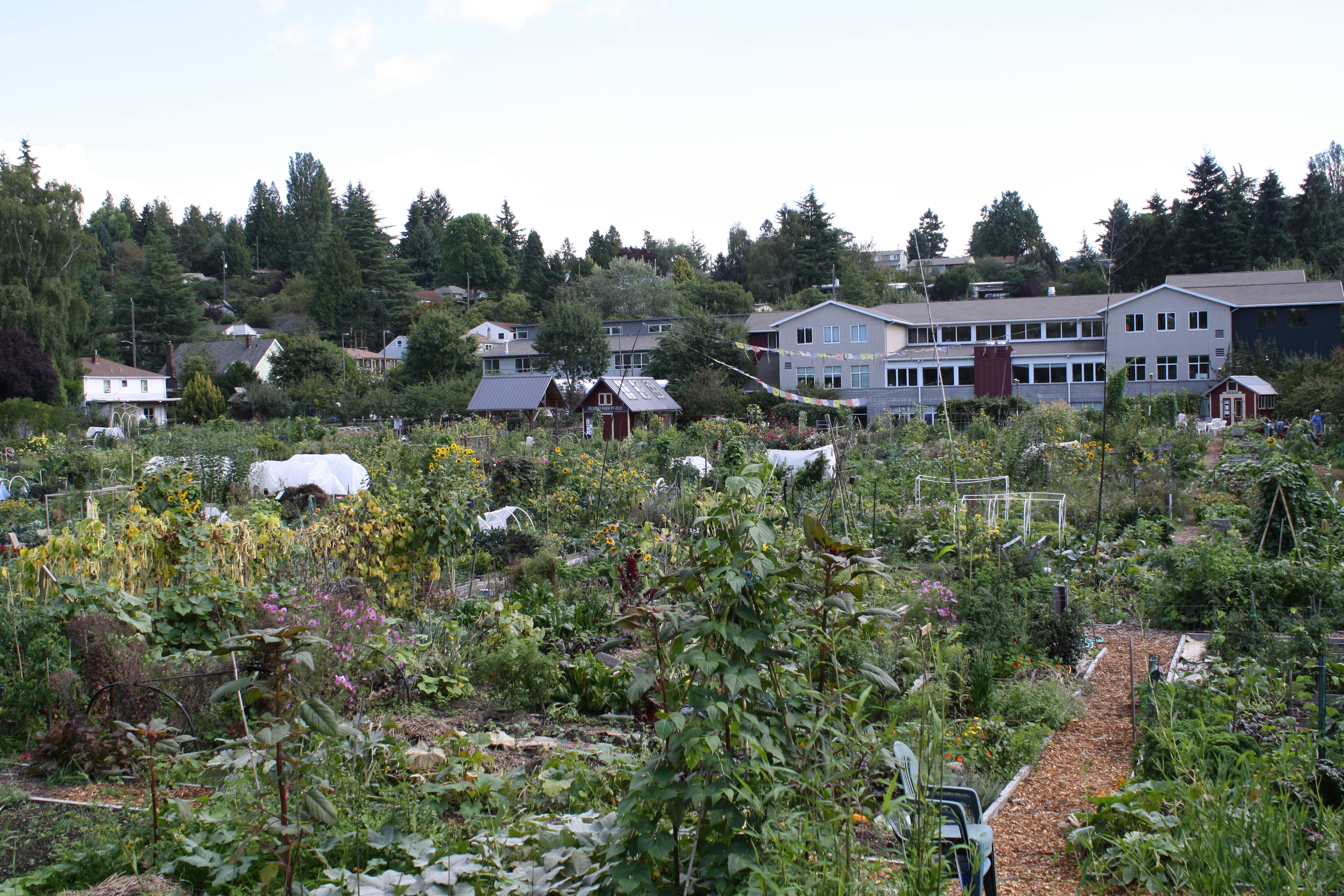
Picardo Farm community garden with the buildings of University Prep in the background.

Picardo Farm is a 98,000 sq ft (9,100 m^{2}) parcel of property in Wedgwood, Seattle, Washington, consisting largely of 281 plots used for gardening allotments. It is the original P-Patch (the local term for such community gardens): the "P" originally stood for "Picardo", after the family who owned it. The Picardos' land went beyond the present P-Patch; it also encompassed the property of the adjacent Reform Jewish Temple Beth Am and of University Prep, an independent private co-educational, non-sectarian day school for grades six through twelve. The land was part of what had once been known as the Ravenna Swamp.

It is one of two historical farms preserved within Seattle city limits, the other being Marra Farm in South Park. The city's official web site describes Picardo Farm as having "Seattle's best soil… Rich, black, peaty, sucking with moisture in the spring, powdery dry for digging potatoes…

== History ==
=== Creation ===
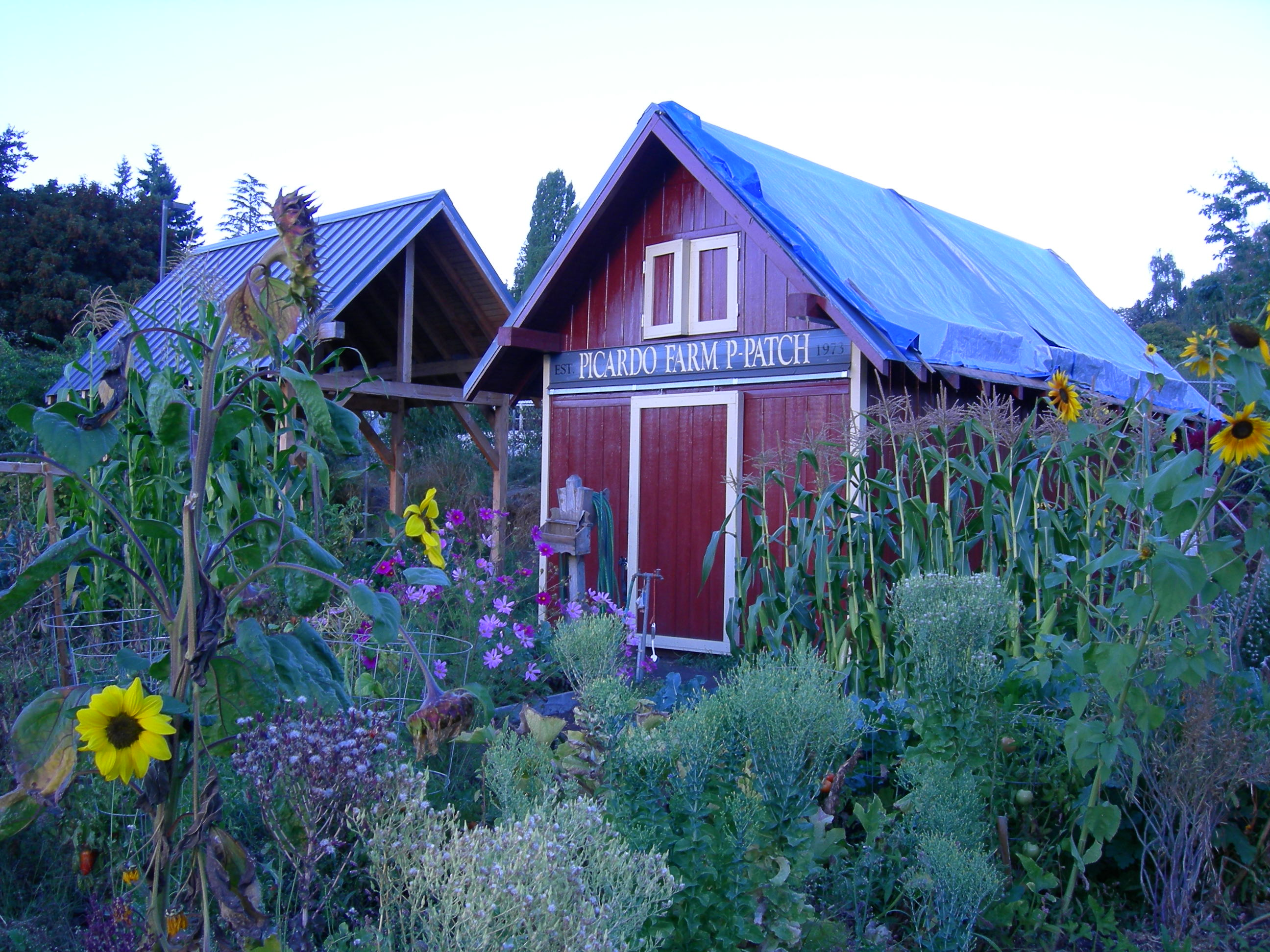
Barn and shelter, Picardo Farm

The Picardo family arrived in Seattle in the 1890s from Salza Irpina in the southern Italian province of Avellino. The three brothers—Ernesto (who became the family patriarch), Orazio, and Sabino—set up farming in South Park along the Duwamish River.

In 1922 they swapped a house in South Park for a piece of land that had been part of what was known as the "Ravenna Swamp". The family farmed the 20 acres (81,000 m^{2}) at 25th Avenue Northeast and Northeast 80th Street from the 1920s to about 1962 or '63. Architect Victor Steinbrueck, writing in 1962, called it "an unusual reminder of the past" and praised its old barn (now demolished) as "a simple example of the anonymous architecture that has always been part of the local scene." Rainie Picardo leased out plots for a few more years, and then the city bought the land.

=== Ravenna Wetland ===
The peaty soil was ideal for farming but was poorly suited for buildings. Some small houses were built along 25th Avenue just south of Picardo Farm and were effectively floating on the peat bog. When the city installed sewer lines along 25th Avenue, the water table sank and houses began to slide off of their foundations. The city eventually purchased these lots to build the Dahl Playfield. At least one of the houses was moved to a new site.

=== Venus statue controversy ===
The Picardo Venus

The Picardo Farm was also known for Steve Anderson's 2 1/4-foot-high bronze statue known as the Picardo Venus: "Pregnant, naked, hair in dreadlocks and sporting a sparkling nose stud". The statue attracted criticism due to its placement next to a children's play area. One P-Patch gardener remarked of it, "She's glorifying fertility a little too much for kids, isn't she?" Nonetheless, a January 2000 poll of the Picardo gardeners resulted in a decision to keep the statue.

== Amenities ==
From late 2009 to early 2010 a Clivus Multrum composting toilet system was installed on the NE portion of the farm.

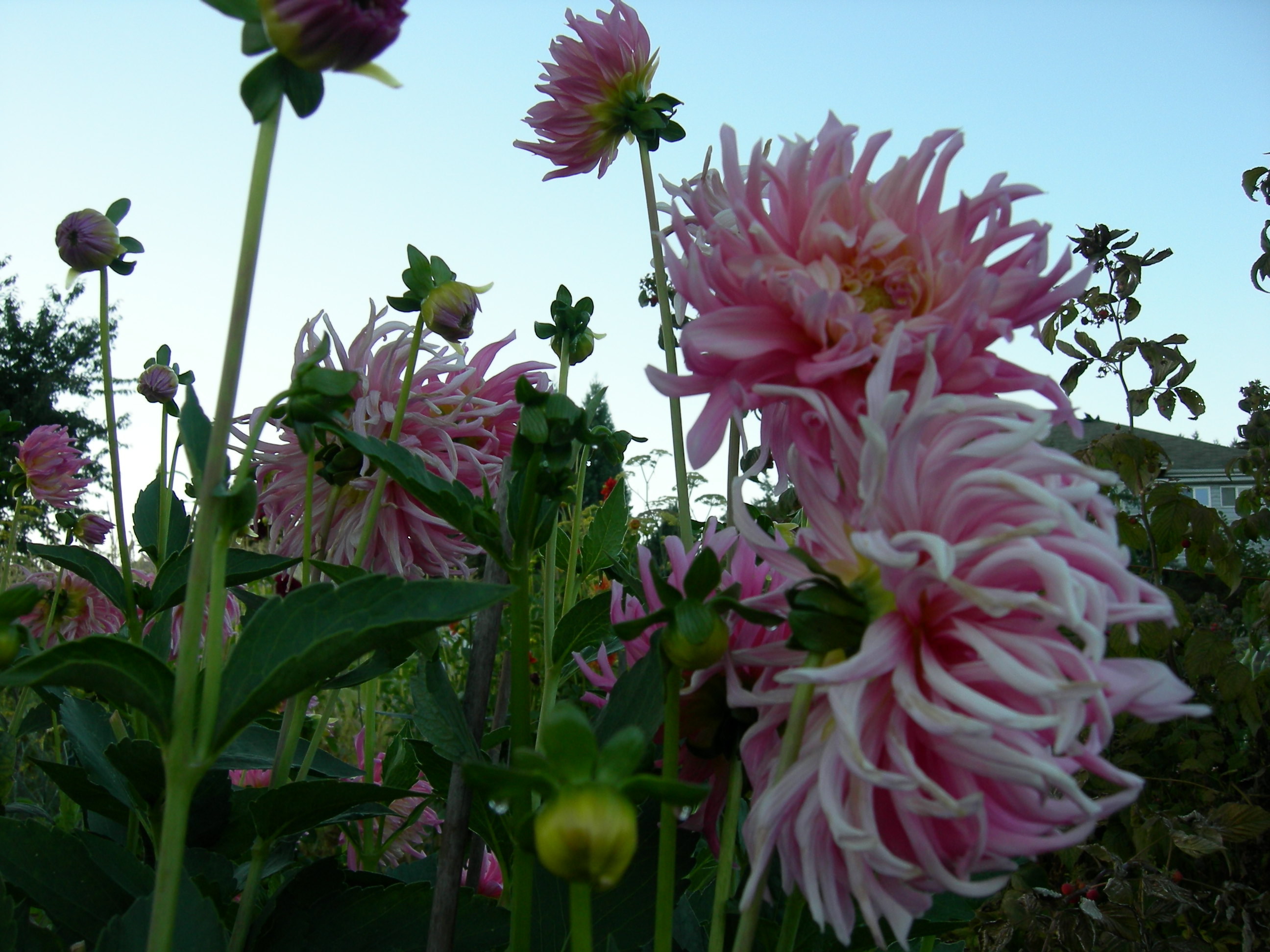
Flowers, Picardo Farm

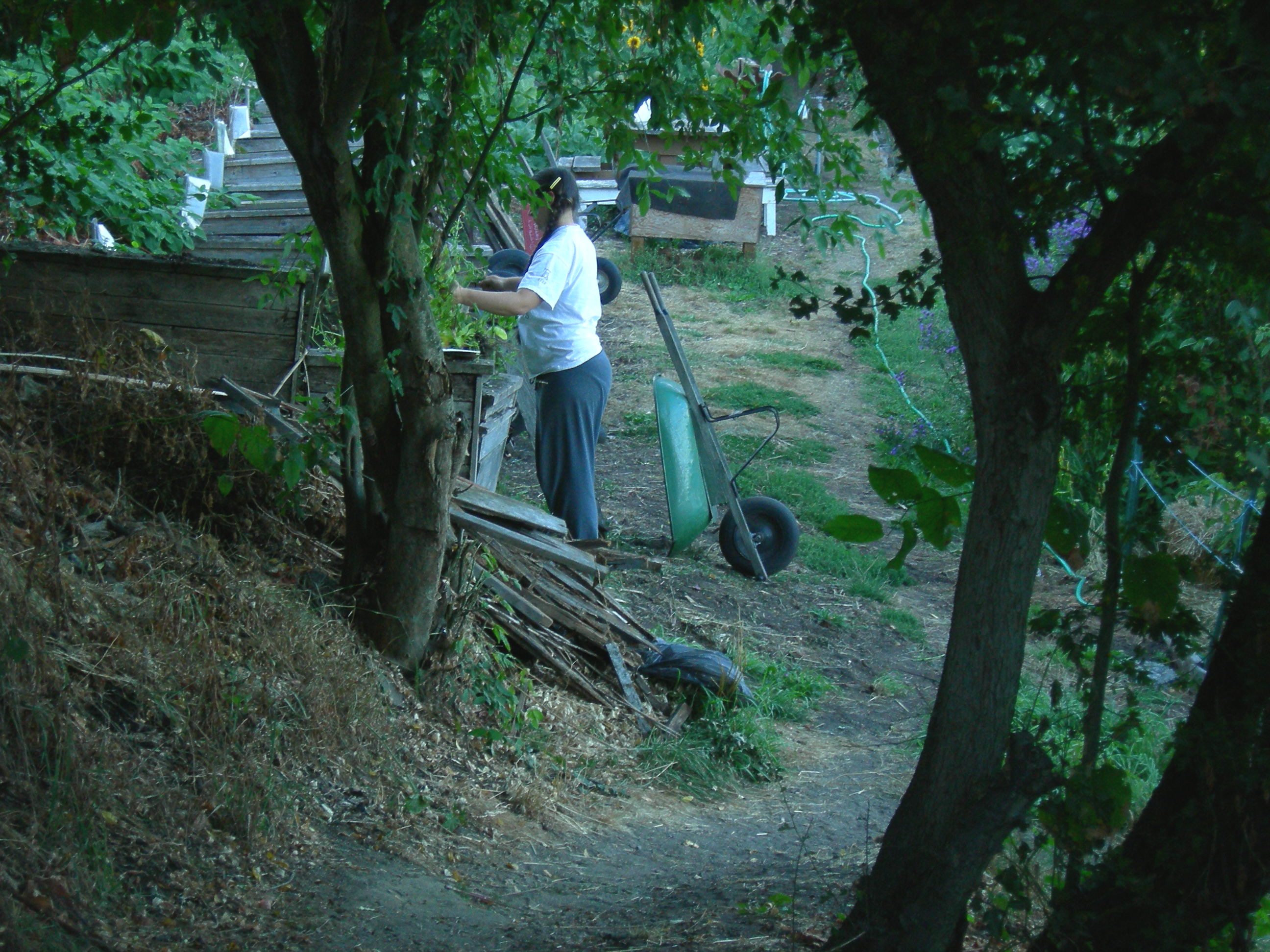
Gardening at Picardo Farm

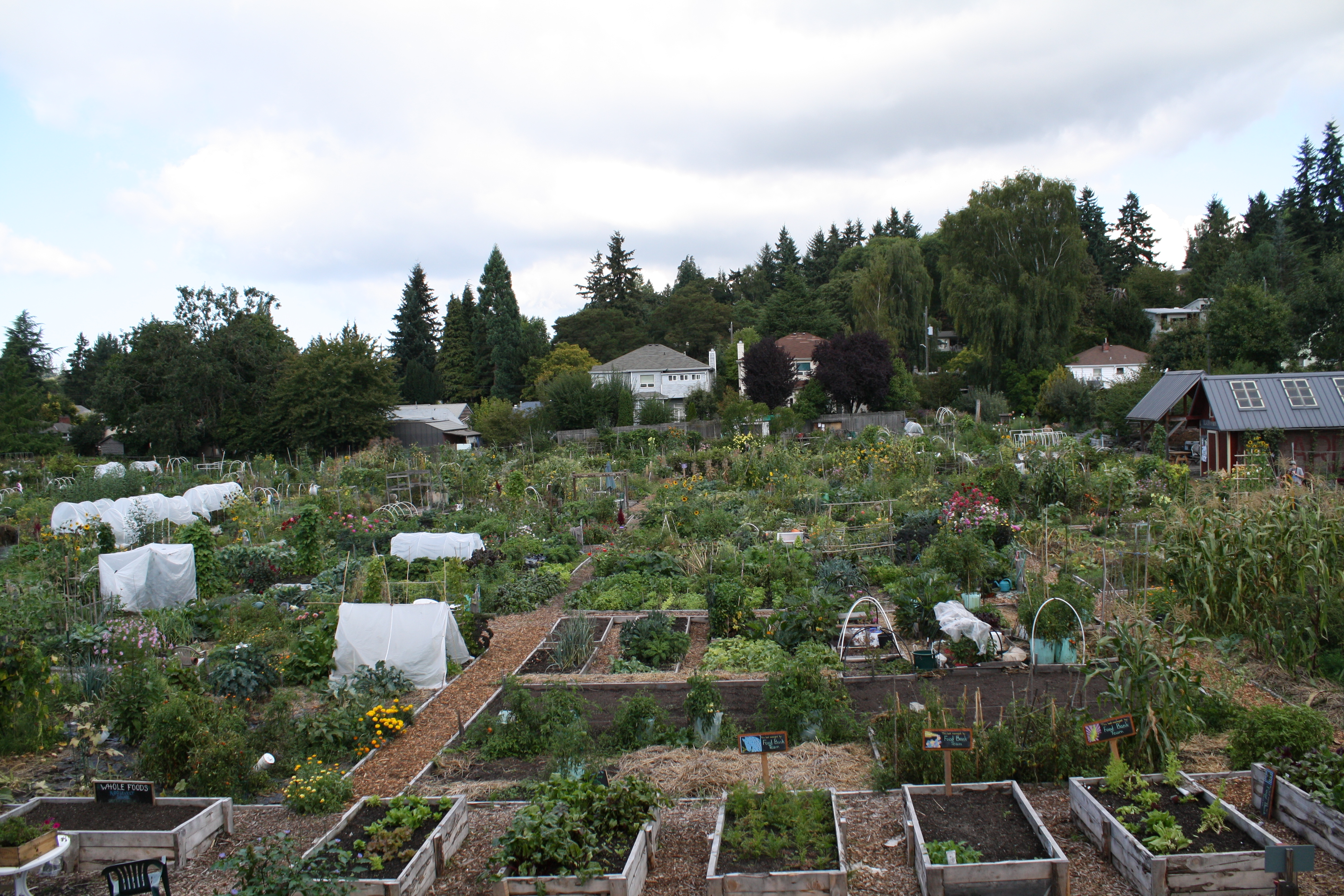

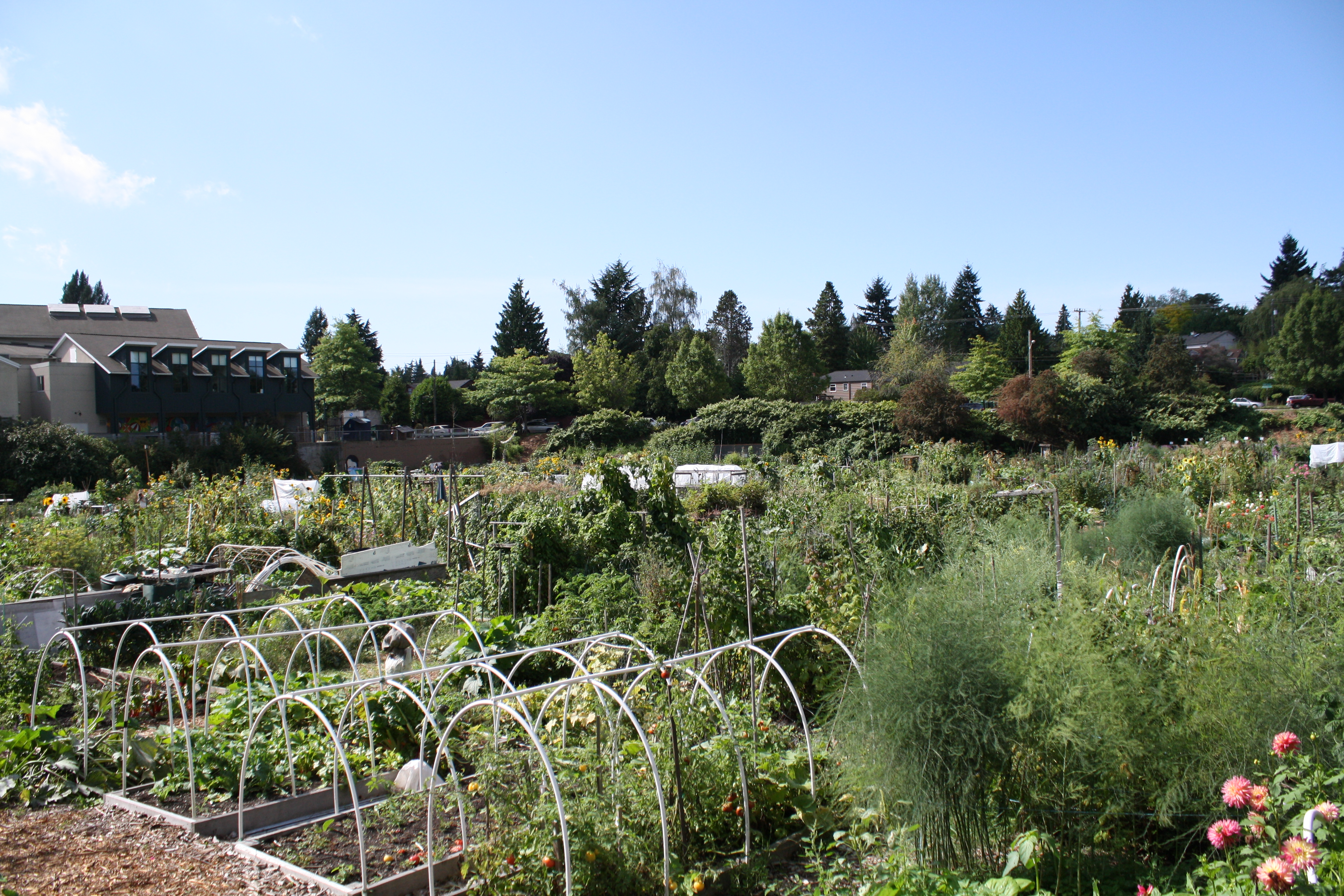
