= Marra Farm =

Historic agricultural parcels inside Seattle city limits

Coordinates: 47°31′18″N 122°19′40″W

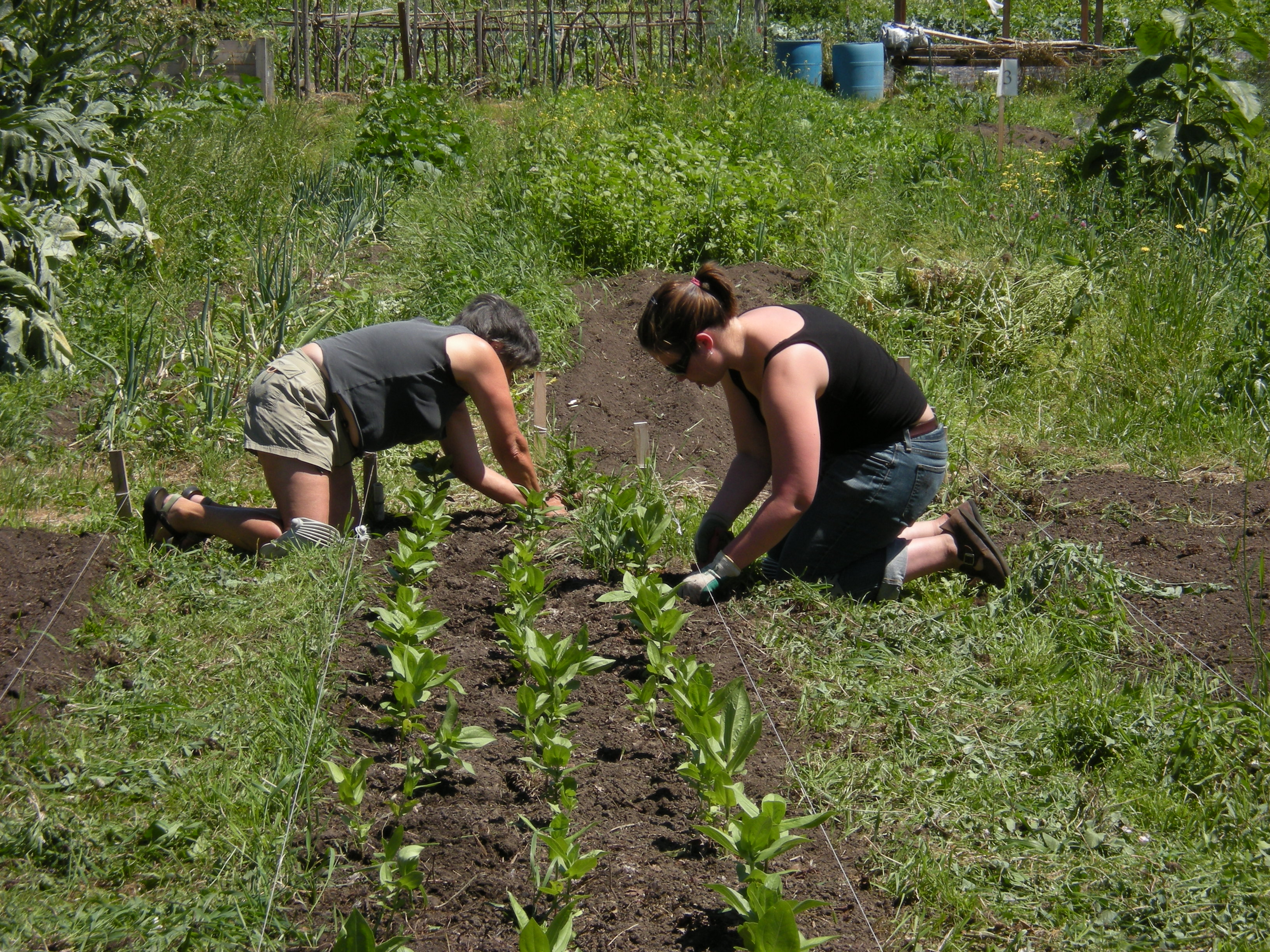
Two women tending plants at Marra Farm

Marra Farm, a 4-acre (1.6 ha) plot of land in Marra-Desimone Park, South Park, Seattle, Washington is one of only two historic agricultural parcels inside Seattle city limits that retains an agricultural use today; the other is Picardo Farm.

It was operated from the early 1900s until the 1970s as a truck farm by the Italian American Marra family, and then sold to King County. Little was done with the land until 1997, when several neighborhood residents and one VISTA volunteer began restoration efforts. They were joined the following year by several nonprofit organizations, government programs and other individuals. The farm now plays a significant role in providing produce to people living in the largely poor neighborhood of South Park, growing more than 13,000 pounds (5,900 kg) of organic produce each year.

In 2000, community organizer John Beal and the King Conservation District daylighted a section of the Lost Fork of Hamm Creek on the western edge of Marra Farm.

As of 2008, the farmland is shared among the several member organizations of the Marra Farm Coalition. Lettuce Link, under the aegis of anti-poverty organization Solid Ground; Seattle's P-Patch system of allotment gardens; Seattle Youth Garden Works (SYGW), through which at-risk youths operate a cooperative market garden business, selling their produce at the Columbia City Farmer's Market; Mien Community Garden, tended by low-income Mien who practice their traditional agricultural techniques; and the South Park Neighborhood Association (SPNA). The SPNA provides services including meeting space and liability insurance.

Also as of 2008, Seattle Parks and Recreation is in the process of several improvements to the farmland and is rehabilitating land immediately east of the agricultural area. They are establishing trails and paths, play areas, social gathering areas including a community pavilion, and swales for drainage.
