= Wedgwood, Seattle =

Wedgwood
- Seattle Neighborhood
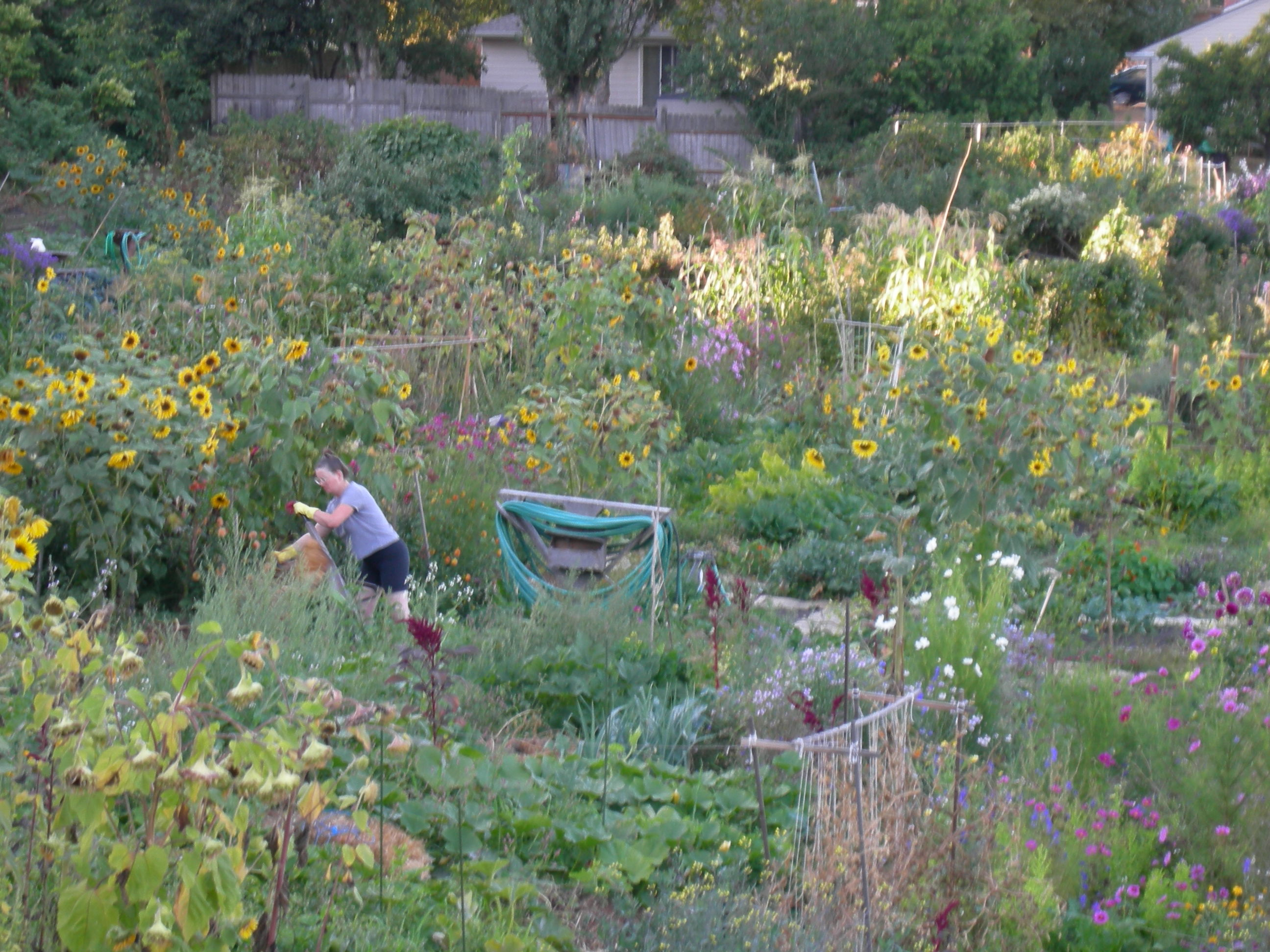
- The Picardo Farm P-Patch community garden in Wedgwood

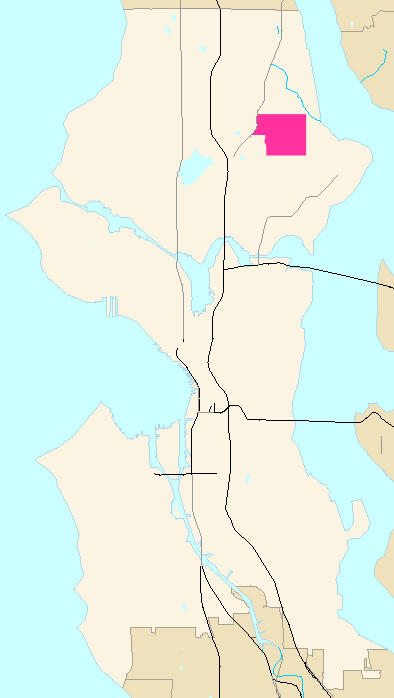
- Map of Wedgwood's location in Seattle
- Coordinates: 47°41′26″N 122°17′12″W
- Country: USA

Population (2023)(Wedgwood/View Ridge)
  - Total: 6,978

Wedgwood is a middle-class residential neighborhood of northeast Seattle, Washington with a modest commercial strip. Wedgwood is located about two miles (3.2 km) north, and slightly east, of the University of Washington; it is about six miles (9.7 km) northeast of Downtown. The neighborhood is typical of Seattle neighborhoods in having more than one name and having different, overlapping, but well-documented definitions of the neighborhood.

The misspelling Wedgewood is not uncommon—it is used by at least five businesses and even appears in the unofficial City Clerk's Neighborhood Map Atlas—but the origin and spelling of the name are clear: the neighborhood was named after the English bone china-maker Wedgwood, the favorite of the wife of Albert ("Al") Balch (1903–1976), the developer who named the neighborhood. Balch was also the founder of adjoining View Ridge.

== History ==
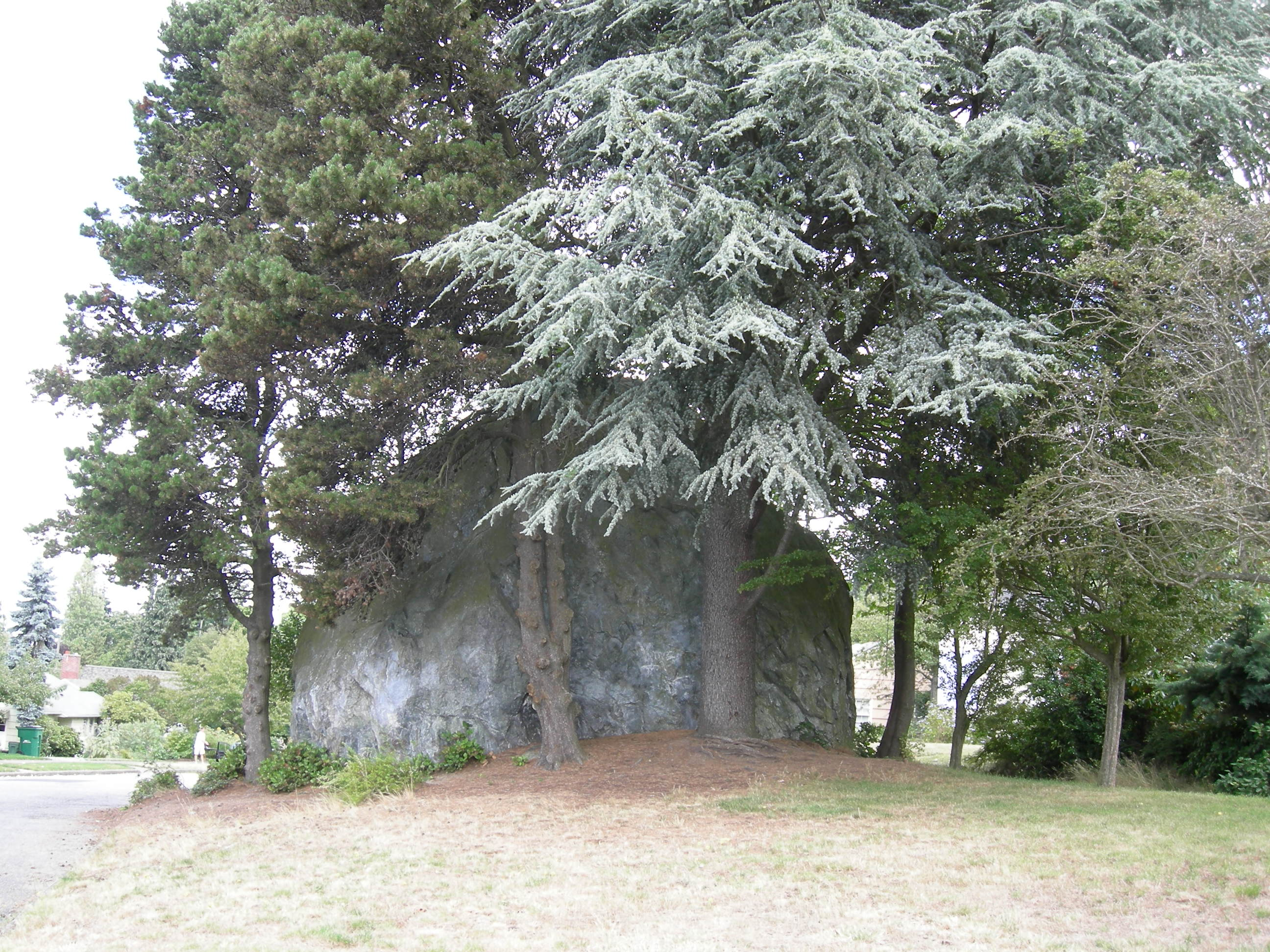
The Wedgwood Rock

The area has been inhabited since the end of the last glacial period (c. 8,000 BCE—10,000 years ago). The Dkh^{w}'Duw'Absh, "the People of the Inside", and the xachua'bsh or hah-choo-AHBSH, "People of a Large Lake" or "Lake People", today the Duwamish tribe, Native Americans of the Lushootseed (Skagit-Nisqually) Coast Salish hunted and traveled through what is now Wedgwood. The Wedgwood Rock, a glacial erratic boulder 19 ft (5.8 m) tall by 75 ft (23 m) circumference became the intersection of a number of trails through dense, old growth forest that covered what is now Seattle. The neighborhood has adopted Big Rock after it was protected from housing development in 1941.

The land that formed the original core of Wedgwood, west of 35th Avenue NE between 80th and 85th Streets, was at one time a heavily wooded ginseng farm. Charles E. Thorpe had cleared a portion of his 40-acre (160,000 m^{2}) tract north of the Seattle city limits of the time, building a log cabin from the wood of his own trees. By the 1920s, 35th Avenue NE was becoming a thoroughfare with homes and businesses (the first store opened in 1922), the electric (1923), water (1926), and sewer grids had been extended to the area, and it was becoming too urban for Thorpe's tastes. The Jesuit institution Seattle University paid Thorpe $65,000 for the property, planning to build a new campus there and move north from First Hill. Thorpe left Seattle, never to return.

One month later came the Stock Market Crash of 1929. The Great Depression put the Jesuits' plans for the new campus on hold. Thorpe's cabin became St. Ignatius Parish in 1929; the congregation grew through the Depression years, although it was served at that time only by visiting priests. By 1940, the Jesuits had decided not to relocate Seattle University, and sold Thorpe's 40 acres (160,000 m^{2}) to Albert Balch at a loss, for only $22,500, barely a third of what they had paid for the land in 1929.

A Catholic presence remains in the neighborhood: the parish of St. Ignatius became the parish of Our Lady of the Lake at its present location on 35th Avenue at 89th Street NE (c. 1961).

Wedgwood was the first Seattle neighborhood where considerable numbers of large trees were preserved when the neighborhood was built.

When Balch obtained the land from the Jesuits, it was still "completely undeveloped, heavily treed, and with only one structure," Thorpe's cabin.

Major development of the neighborhood began during World War II with defense worker housing; initial development was largely by Balch and his partner Maury Setzer. Balch and Setzer built 500 homes on 40 acres (160,000 m², 16 hectares), constituting the center of today's Wedgwood neighborhood. At the time, the area was north of Seattle city limits (Seattle ended at NE 65th Street). In its first act of community organizing, Wedgwood formed its own Volunteer Fire Department (Fire District #19), founded November 11, 1943, absorbed (with Wedgwood) into the city March 20, 1945. During its short life, the volunteer department operated a Ford Model A truck with a pump, based in the garage of a neighborhood home. In this wartime period, many of the volunteer firefighters were women.

Al Balch was a direct descendant of 17th century New England settler John Balch. Possibly in tribute to this heritage, he had the firm of Thomas, Grainger & Thomas design the houses in the Cape Cod style. Each house was unique in some way, and each originally sold for $5,000 ($65,900 in 2005 dollars); currently (as of 2005, 2006) all go for upwards of $300,000 ($22,800 in 1941 dollars); many (albeit with updating and often with further improvements and extensions) go for as much as $450,000.

Other portions of Wedgwood have distinct histories of their own. In 1936, Dr. and Mrs. Philip M. Rogers purchased 15 acres (61,000 m^{2}) between 40th and 45th Avenues NE, from NE 88th Street to NE 92nd Street. Maple Creek flows through this property, forming a ravine. Until shortly after 1950, they left the land almost entirely undeveloped, allowing it to be used as a Boy Scout camp. According to Valarie Bunn, at the time "no traffic noise could be heard and no electric lights" could be seen in the area of the camp. The land was developed in the 1950s. The Earl J. McLaughlin Plat (between NE 85th and NE 90th Streets, and 30th and 35th Avenue NE) was filed in 1907, but at the time there was no city water or electricity in the area. Few lots were sold at that time, and those were sold cheaply. In 1917, Earl J. McLaughlin relocated to Cleveland, Ohio, where he remained active in real estate for 12 years, before emigrating to Canada.

The large P-Patch Community Garden near the west edge of the neighborhood, and the adjoining University Prep School and Temple Beth Am (Reform synagogue) are on land that remained a working farm as late as 1965. Wedgwood has Seattle's oldest and largest P-Patch (mid-1960s); as of 2005, there are now 52 others. The "P" originally stood for "Picardo", the family who farmed the land (1922–1965).

Just south of the old Picardo Farm is Dahl Playfield. Like the P-Patch, it is former peat bog land, once known as the Ravenna Swamp. In the 1940s houses stood on part of what is now the playfield; at that time, Picardo Farm was the site contemplated for a park. However, after sewer lines were built along 25th Avenue NE in the late 1940s, houses began sinking in the peat; the city bought them out and turned the land into the "80th Street Playfield". In 1952, the bog caught fire: portions subsided as much as 5 feet (1.5 m), and the park was temporarily closed. Over the next few years, an estimated 75,000 cubic yards (57,000 cubic meters) of peat was replaced by fill dirt, and the park reopened. In 1955, the park was renamed after a former Park Board director, Waldo J. Dahl. In September 1992, the Wedgwood Community Council officially "adopted" the park.

The Wedgewood [sic] Estates apartment complex on NE 75th Street between 37th and 39th avenues NE was purchased by the Seattle Housing Authority in 2001 in an effort to preserve a supply of moderately priced housing in this part of Seattle.

== The Jolly Roger and the Coon Chicken Inn ==
In 1916, Washington joined Prohibition, and north Seattle saw an upswing in commercial activity. Unincorporated areas of King County accessible by auto became popular locations for speakeasies selling illegal liquor and purveying prostitution and gambling, often in clever guises. One remarkable structure among numerous establishments was the China Castle, later the Jolly Roger, having a unique tower from which a watchman signaled the approach of police, visible from miles away. In the event of a raid, patrons and employees could leave via tunnels such as one under the highway, easily dispersing via the wooded ravine on the other side.

The Jolly Roger continued as a popular dance hall and restaurant. It was designated a Seattle Historic Landmark in 1979. On October 19, 1989, the restaurant, located at 8721 Lake City Way (formerly Bothell Way) burned in an arson fire. The fire was somewhat suspicious, but only relative to its storied past. Police had neither motive nor suspects. Investigators were not able to determine how the arsonist got inside past a burglar alarm, with no signs of forced entry. At the time, the building had just been purchased the week before from the previous owner, with whom the buyer was entangled in legal and financial red tape. The previous owner was in the building removing his possessions the day before the fire. When firefighters arrived hours after the fire had begun in the basement, a man directed them. He seemed so sure of where the fire began that they assumed he was an employee. After the fire was extinguished, the man could not be found. The owners stated that he was not an employee.

One year after the fire, preservation activists sought to have the structure rebuilt. Before their efforts got off the ground, the building was hastily demolished on January 11, 1991, obviating its appeal. A modern oil company-owned convenience store and gas station now stands on the location.

Slightly south of the former Jolly Roger site, on the south side of Lake City Way, The Growler Guys sits on the site of a former Coon Chicken Inn. Beginning in 1929, the Coon Chicken Inn sold southern-style food in a restaurant whose themes drew heavily on racist stereotypes akin to blackface in a similar style to Sambo's on Aurora Avenue N. Black residents of Seattle protested the restaurant's imagery, and the NAACP and The Northwest Enterprise sued the restaurant over its logo. In response, the restaurant's owner made minor changes to the building's exterior and its logo. The restaurant's racist themes remained until 1949, when the owner transformed the restaurant into a general store.

== Business ==
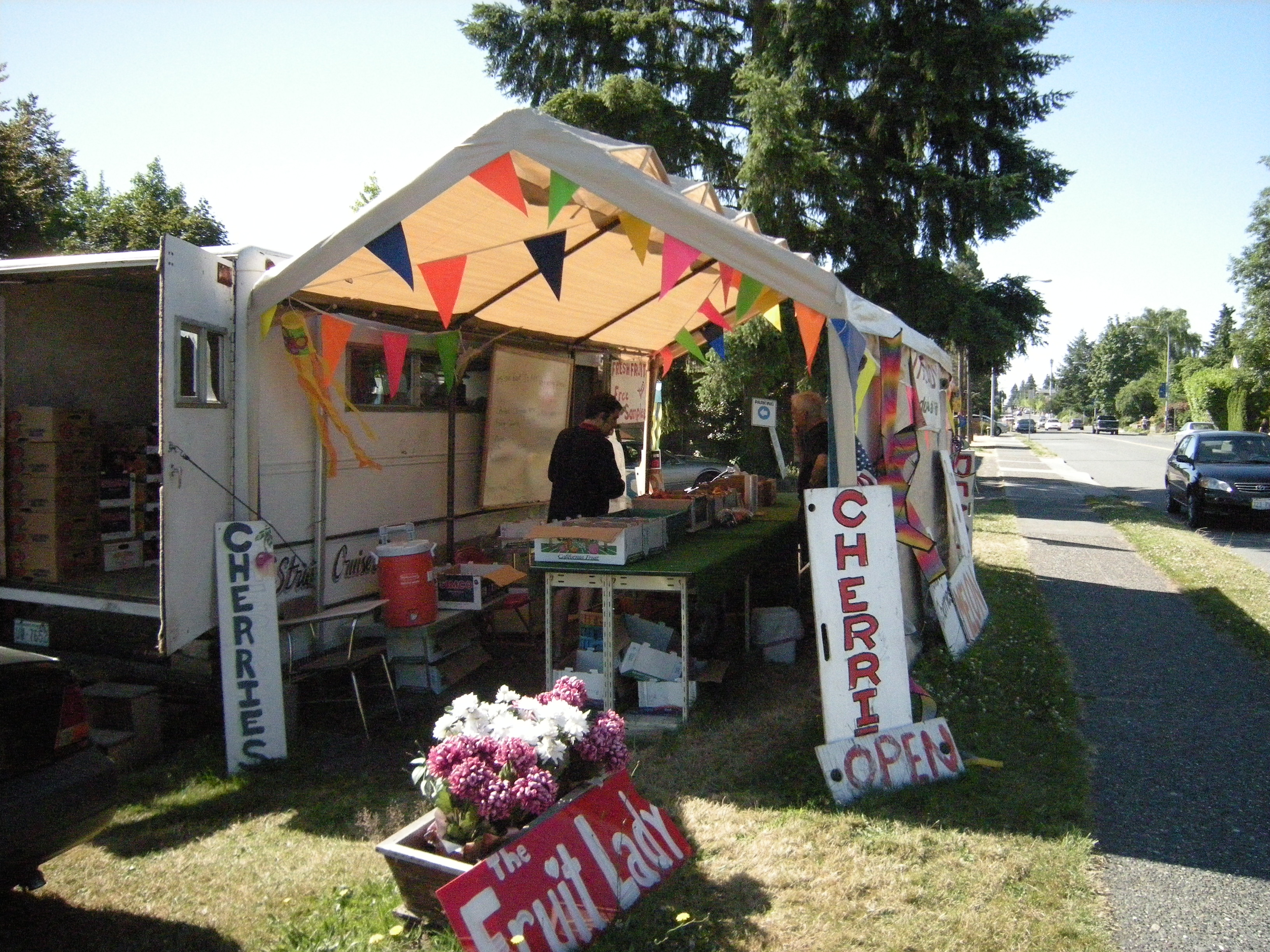
The Fruit Lady, a seasonal business in Wedgwood (2008)

Mr. and Mrs. Nick Jacklin opened the first store in what is now Wedgwood in 1922, before either electricity or city water reached the neighborhood. The building still survives as the garage of a house in the 7500 block of 35th Avenue NE. That same block was later (1949–1974) home of McGillivray's Variety and Gift Store, whose range of wares ranged from penny candy, children's clothing and hundreds of different children's birthday cards to "fine collector dolls… in a better selection than… even… the downtown Frederick & Nelson's" and "sequins in every color manufactured".

Half a mile (0.7 km) north, McVicar's Hardware Store (1946–1986)—in the space in the 8500 block of 35th Avenue NE opened shortly after World War II. The shortage of consumer goods right after the war meant that some of their early stock was manufactured on-site from war surplus. Adapting their business to whatever people in the neighborhood wanted to buy, as Wedgwood residents began putting in lawns and gardens, McVicar's sold them the requisite supplies; they sold specialty foods and rented out skis; they were also, for a decade, the only hardware store in the state licensed to sell beer and wine. They ran do-it-yourself clinics on everything from tools to gourmet cooking; in 1954, they were mentioned in a Time magazine article on the do-it-yourself trend.

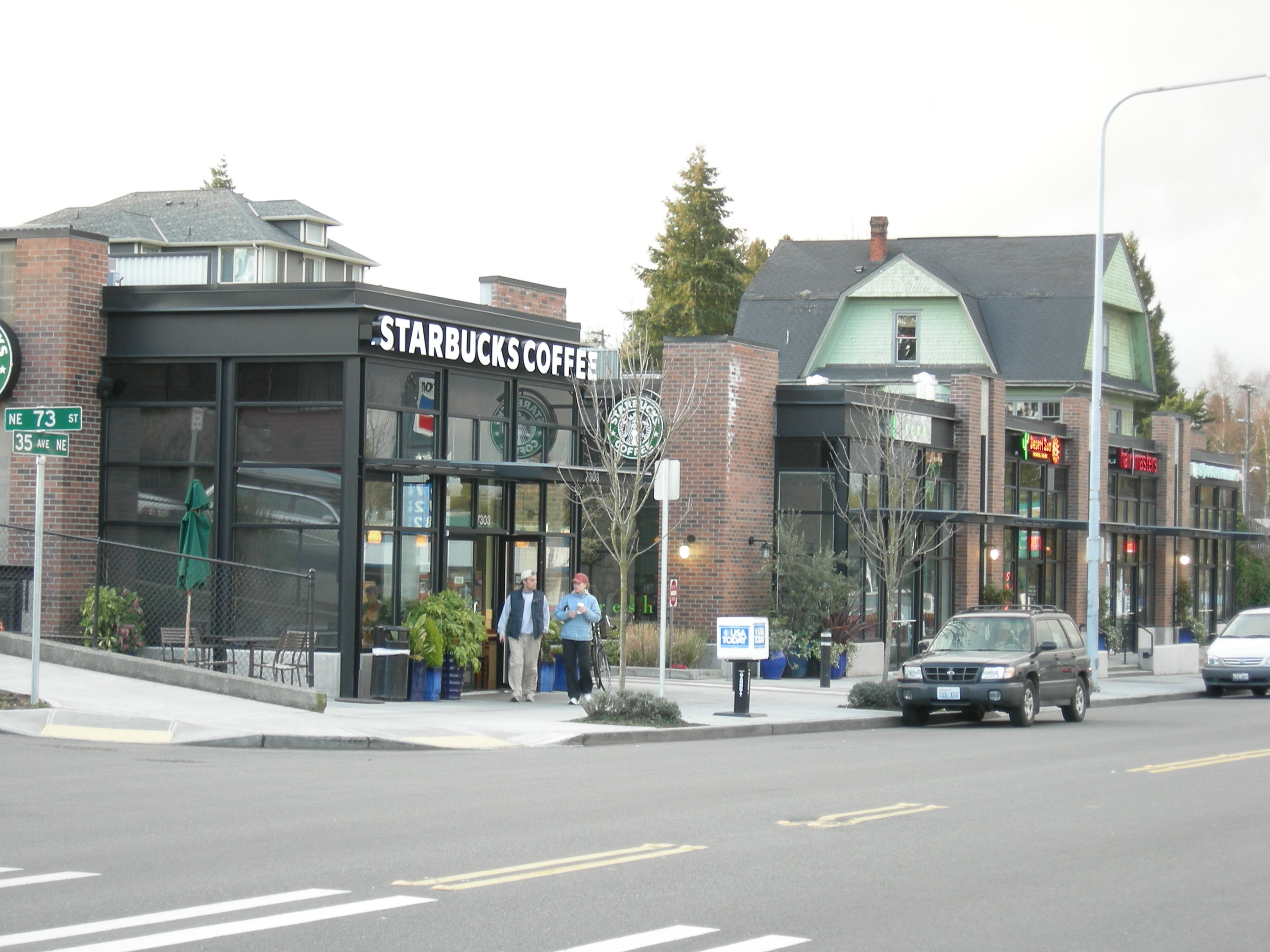
7300 block of 35th Ave NE

Today, there is a shopping district along 35th Avenue NE, with concentrations of stores at NE 75th Street and NE 85th Street. A small QFC store at the Wedgwood Center near 85th Street closed in 2021 and is planned to be redeveloped into a mixed-use retail and residential building. The center also has the Wedgwood Broiler, a 1950s American style neighborhood restaurant and bar.

The neighborhood's post office is located midway between the main commercial centers on 35th Avenue. On NE 68th Street, just south of what the city unofficially defines to be Wedgwood proper, is the Seattle Public Library Northeast Branch, the largest neighborhood branch and the second-busiest public library, second only to the Seattle Central Library. The offices and retail store of Birds Connect Seattle (formerly the Seattle Audubon Society) is located in Wedgwood.

== Community ==
=== Community organizations ===
In 1946, Wedgwood residents formed Wedgwood Community Club, which lasted for several decades, but eventually petered out. In the 1980s this vacuum was filled by the current Wedgwood Community Council.

The Musicians Emeritus Symphony Orchestra (MESO), Wedgwood's non-profit community orchestra, was founded in 1971 by Seattle mayor Wes Uhlman. MESO was originally intended specifically for older musicians, and as of 2008, the oldest is 91 years old, but now the orchestra includes players of all ages. In 2009 MESO changed its name to Seattle Festival Orchestra (SFO). Currently SFO rehearses and performs in the Wedgwood neighborhood. Four times a concert season, SFO performs at the University Prep Academy.

=== Education ===
Wedgwood neighborhood schools (as defined by the unofficial city map) include:

- Wedgwood Elementary School (Kindergarten–5th grade) – Seattle Public Schools
- Our Lady of the Lake Parish School (preschool–8th grade) – Roman Catholic
- Concordia Lutheran School (preschool–8th grade) – Lutheran, is several blocks further south and is east of NE 35th Street, and might be considered to fall well within View Ridge
- Nathan Eckstein Middle School (6th–8th grade) – Seattle Public Schools, is immediately south of NE 75th Street (considered by some to place it just outside Wedgwood)
- University Prep (6th–12th grade)
- Nathan Hale High School (9th-12th grade) in Meadowbrook and Roosevelt High School (9th-12th grade) in Ravenna are rival high schools that split students from Wedgwood.

== Religion ==
Wedgwood and the adjoining View Ridge and Bryant neighborhoods constitute one of the three centers of Seattle's Jewish community, along with Seward Park and the suburb of Mercer Island. Nonetheless, Jews constitute less than 10% of the neighborhood's population. Located in Wedgwood are:

- Community Center: Stroum Jewish Community Center, now located near Dahl Field
- Reform synagogue: Temple Beth Am
- Conservative synagogue: Congregation Beth Shalom
- Two Orthodox synagogues are within walking distance of Wedgwood, though outside of the city's unofficial boundary for the neighborhood: Emmanuel Congregation and Congregation Shaarei Tefilah, the latter which is associated with Chabad Lubavitch)

Christian churches based in Wedgwood include:

- Messiah Lutheran Church (Missouri Synod), with a preschool through 8th grade school (Concordia), on 35th Avenue at 70th Street
- Wedgwood Presbyterian Church on 35th Avenue at NE 80th Street (which also hosts an Indonesian Presbyterian congregation)
- Our Lady of the Lake Catholic Church, with a parish preschool through 8th grade school, on 35th Avenue at NE 89th
- Wedgwood Community Church on 30th Avenue at 82nd Street
- University Unitarian Church, a Modernist structure designed by Paul Hayden Kirk, on 35th Avenue at NE 68th Street

Wedgwood also hosted a congregation of Mars Hill Church, a multi-campus church with several locations across western Washington. The church meets in a renovated Baptist church originally built in 1952 on NE 95th Street near 35th. Official services began in 2007. After the dissolution of Mars Hill in 2014, this became OneLife Community Church.

== Geography ==
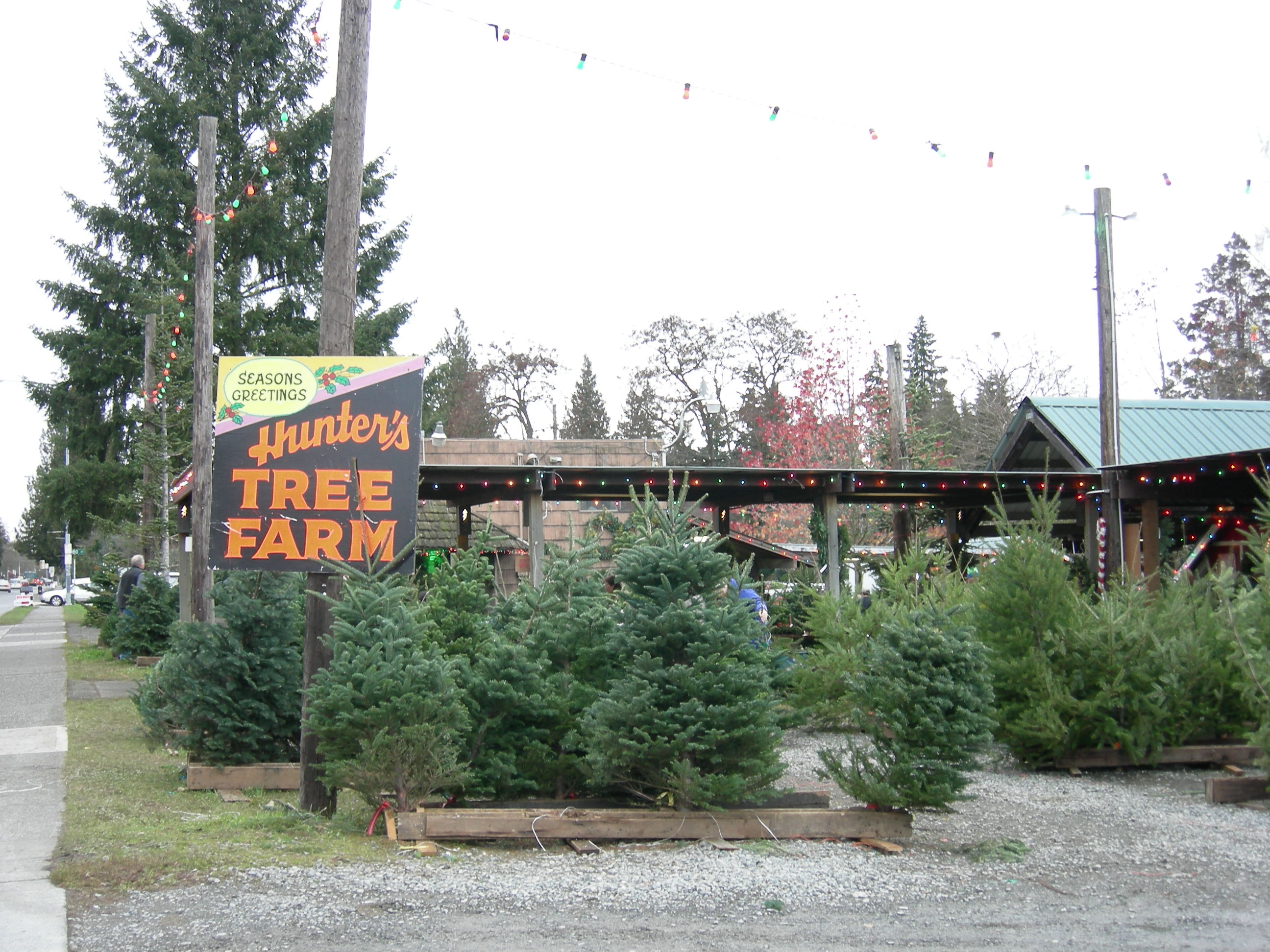
Hunter's Tree Farm

Like all Seattle neighborhoods, Wedgwood has no official or universally agreed-upon borders. The unofficial City Clerk's Neighborhood Map Atlas shows its boundaries as

- bounded on the north by NE 95th Street
- bounded on the east by 45th Avenue NE
- bounded on the south by NE 75th Street
- bounded on the west by a route coming north from NE 75th Street along 25th Avenue NE, then jogging due west along NE 85th Street and snaking up Lake City Way NE to NE 95th Street

This is quite similar to how the Wedgwood Community Council (WCC) defined the neighborhood limits in 1956, the only difference being the western limit. The WCC considered 25th Avenue NE to be the limit all the way north; this excludes the area west of 25th Avenue NE, extending west to Lake City Way NE between NE 85th Street and NE 95th Street.

However, NE 75th Street presents no discernible break in the business strip along 35th Avenue NE, which continues south to NE 65th Street; many of the businesses and churches in these ten blocks identify themselves as being in Wedgwood; some even have "Wedgwood" in their names. If the City Clerk's unofficial borders are accepted, then the landmark Wedgwood Rock, a large 19-foot (5.8 m)-tall boulder at the corner of 28th Avenue NE and NE 72nd Street, lies in the adjoining Ravenna neighborhood.

Several other well-documented interpretations exist. Among them, "Seattle Neighborhoods" of HistoryLink.org's Encyclopedia of Washington State History does not define boundaries for Wedgwood, other than as adjacent to surrounding neighborhoods. Their map suggests Wedgwood is between 25th and 45th Avenues, and NE 75th Street may divide from View Ridge neighborhood.

The "Neighbors" project (1996–2000) of the Seattle Post-Intelligencer, currently updated as the "Webtowns" section of the on-line P-I, defines Wedgwood a little differently. While they say the boundaries are NE 95th Street to the north, NE 75th Street to the south, 25th Ave NE to the west and approximately 45th Avenue NE to the east, "Neighbors" defines Wedgwood primarily in terms of a series of businesses and other public spaces on 35th Avenue NE, extending as far south as NE 68th Street: from south to north, the Northeast Library (NE 68th), Rod and Judy Neldam's Grateful Bread bakery (NE 70th), the post office at NE 77th, the Wedgwood Broiler (NE 83rd), Matthew's Red Apple Market (NE 85th, since overtaken by supermarket chain QFC), and finally the Fiddler's Inn Pub (NE 94th), built in 1934, a former dive that was fixed up in the early 1990s. They describe Wedgwood as having more in common with Ballard than with Capitol Hill (which is to say, not particularly hip or trendy), and say that downtown Wedgwood along 35th Avenue NE has a look and feel of a small town main street, for better and worse, as it struggles like Main Streets across the country in the age of malls and Internet shopping.

"Neighbors" further asserts that Wedgwood has always been a middle-class neighborhood, trending toward upper middle, with home sales suggesting that it is currently becoming more of a young family area, as the initial 1940s owners reach the end of their lives and Baby Boomers become retirees. Emblematic of this change, the former McVicar's space, after serving as a full-service bicycle shop 1986–2001, is now All That Dance, once Seattle's largest dance studio with an enrollment of more than 1,500—mostly children, (prior to relocating out of the immediate area) a testament to the changes in the area. Wedgwood has long had an active neighborhood council, one of the most active in Seattle, effectively lobbying in and for the neighborhood, as well as working with the unusually numerous schools in the area.

The P-I's current "Webtowns" section has merged Wedgwood and View Ridge with Sand Point and two popular waterfront parks, Magnuson Park and Matthews Beach Park. "Webtowns" Wedgwood is located between Sand Point Way and a small business district on 35th Avenue NE around NE 75th Street. The neighborhood is described as less expensive, though with respect to Seattle housing prices, the comparison is relative to places with expansive views in tonier adjacent neighborhoods like View Ridge and Sand Point, or high demand like the University District.

National standards long adopted by the Seattle Department of Transportation define minor arterials, in part, as generally along neighborhood boundaries: NE 65th, 75th, and 95th streets, and 35th Avenue.

== See also ==
- Thornton Creek (Wedgwood is in the watershed)
- Daylighting (streams)

== Bibliography ==
- Dailey, Tom (n.d.). "Duwamish-Seattle". Coast Salish Villages of Puget Sound.
  Page links to Village Descriptions Duwamish-Seattle section. Recommended start is "Coast Salish Villages of Puget Sound"
- "Parish History" (PDF). Our Lady of the Lake Parish.
- Shenk, Carol; Pollack, Laurie; Dornfeld, Ernie; Frantilla, Anne; Neman, Chris (June 2002). "About neighborhood maps". Seattle City Clerk's Office Neighborhood Map Atlas. Office of the Seattle City Clerk, Information Services.
  Sources for this atlas and the neighborhood names used in it include a 1980 neighborhood map produced by the Department of Community Development (relocated to the Department of Neighborhoods and other agencies), Seattle Public Library indexes, a 1984–1986 Neighborhood Profiles feature series in the Seattle Post-Intelligencer, numerous parks, land use and transportation planning studies, and records in the Seattle Municipal Archives .
  See also the "Neighbors" project of the Seattle Post-Intelligencer and "Webtowns" of the on-line P-I.
  See also Seattle neighborhoods#Informal districts.
- Wilma, David (July 24, 2001). "Seattle Neighborhoods: Wedgwood – Thumbnail History". Historylink.org Essay 3462.
  Among other things, this gives a good account of the last farming in the neighborhood, of the initial development, and of the Wedgwood Rock; it also gives an extensive set of print references.
- Merritt, Mike (November 30, 1990). "Burning Questions Persist Torching of the Old Jolly Roger Remains a Puzzle and a Pain". Seattle Post-Intelligencer.
- Stein, Alan J. (August 2, 2001). "Jolly Roger restaurant burns in arson fire on October 19, 1989". Title of Complete Work. Seattle Parks and Recreation.
  Stein referenced "Speakeasy? Jolly Roger's Shady Past Still A Mystery," The North Seattle Press, January 9, 1991, p. 1;
  "Burning Questions Persist," Seattle Post-Intelligencer, November 30, 1990, pp. B-1, B-5;
  "Wrecker Flattens Jolly Roger's Charred Remnant," The Seattle Times, January 12, 1992, p. B-1.
- Pilgrim, David; Thorp, John. "The History of Coon Chicken Inn". Jim Crow Museum of Racist Memorabilia. Ferris State University. Archived from the original on September 24, 2015.
  Ferris State University, Big Rapids, Michigan
