= Wedgwood Rock =

Large rock in North Seattle

Coordinates: 47.68084°N 122.2973°W

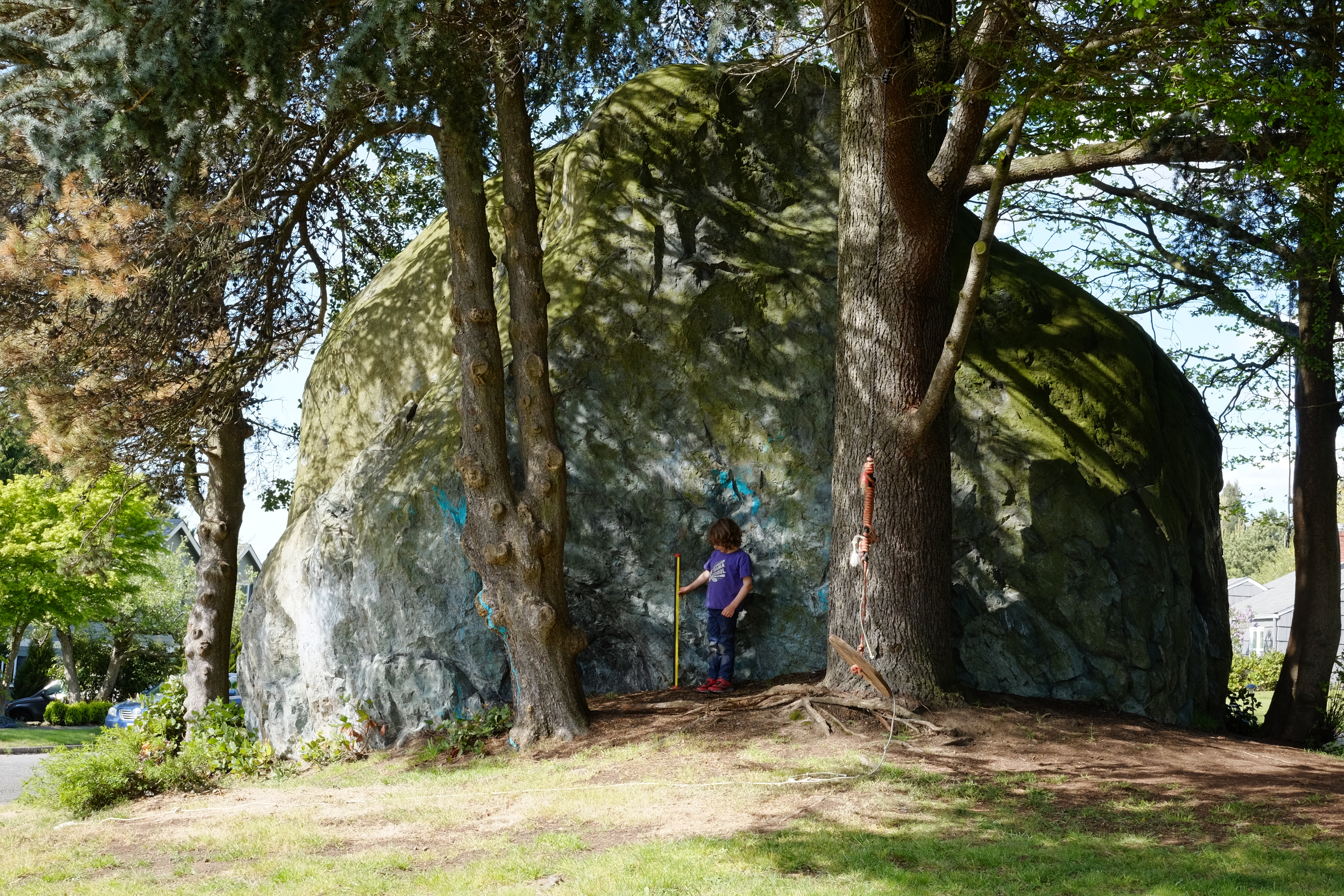
Wedgwood Rock. The child holds a yardstick (0.9 meter long)

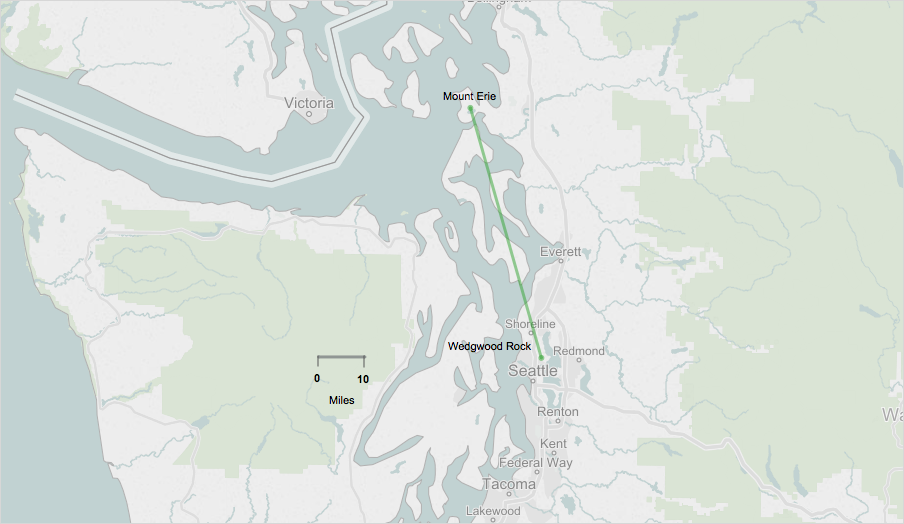
Map of Wedgwood Rock to Mount Erie. The glacial erratic was carried 55 mi (89 km) by the Vashon Glacier 14,000 years ago

Wedgwood Rock is a glacial erratic (known to geologists as the Wedgwood Erratic) near the neighborhood of Wedgwood in Seattle, Washington. Its mineral composition matches that of Mount Erie, on Fidalgo Island in Skagit County, Washington, 55 mi (89 km) north. Prior to the establishment of the Wedgwood neighborhood, the erratic was known first as Lone Rock and later simply as Big Rock. Transported to its site by the Puget Lobe of the Cordilleran Ice Sheet during the Vashon Glaciation more than 14,000 years ago, it was a landmark for Native Americans in what was once a dense forest.

Today, the rock sits in a residential neighborhood on 28th Avenue NE, near NE 72nd Street, still surrounded by trees and brush, and kept clear by local residents.

== 19th century ==
In 1881, the rock, known at the time as Lone Rock, was part of the 160-acre (65 ha) farm of William Weedin. An anonymous 1881 letter to the Seattle Daily Intelligencer about a Fourth of July picnic at the rock described it as "in a dense forest" on Weedin's land, and as "a single rock 80 feet (24 m) in circumference and 19 feet (5.8 m) in height, rather oval-shaped, covered with a solid network of moss and interspersed with liquorice, with its graceful fern-shaped foliage hanging in festoons around it." This rock has an estimated mass of 700 metric tons (690 long tons; 770 short tons).

In 1888 the Weedin property passed to Mary Miller, widow of William Miller. William Miller, an ally of Territorial Governor Isaac Stevens, fought in the Puget Sound War and Yakima War of 1856–1857.

== 20th century and later ==
By the early 20th century, the rock was known as Big Rock. With the Miller family's permission, members of Seattle's Mountaineers Club practiced their rock climbing techniques there. Edmond S. Meany, president of Mountaineers and a professor at the nearby University of Washington brought his students to the rock to learn about glacial movement and land forms. Later, Boy Scouts also learned to climb there, taught by German-born climber and scout leader Wolf Bauer. REI founder Lloyd Anderson taught Mountaineers and Boy Scouts at the rock. Among the prominent climbers whose training started at Big Rock were German-born Fred Beckey and Jim Whittaker, who became the first American to reach the top of Mount Everest.

Mary Miller's son Winlock Miller, a member of the U.W. Board of Regents and a promoter of Mount Rainier National Park, kept the land around the rock undeveloped into the 1940s. He sold in the 1940s to developer Albert Balch, who promised Miller that the area immediately around the rock would be preserved as a park, but failed to keep the promise. In 1946, a citizens group tried and failed to convince the Seattle City Council to preserve the area as a park against landowner Balch's wishes.

Although surrounded by houses, the rock remained a destination for picnickers, university students, climbers, and, in the 1960s, hippies. In reaction to the hippies and their perceived drug use, the Seattle City Council passed an ordinance in 1970 making it a crime to climb the rock, punishable by a fine up to $100.

== See also ==
- List of individual rocks

== Notes ==
=== References ===
- Seattle Neighborhoods: Wedgwood -- Thumbnail History on HistoryLink.org; see especially the section "Big Rock".
- Valarie Bunn, "The Fourth of July, 1881, at the Lone, Big Wedgwood Rock", Wedgwood Echo, Volume 25, Issue IV, July 2010, p. 3, 11. Same article now online on the Wedgwood in Seattle History blog.
- Valarie Bunn, "Who Dropped the Rock", Wedgwood Echo, Volume 26, Issue VI, October 2011, p. 2.
