= University Heights Center =

General information
- Location: 5031 University Way Northeast; Seattle, Washington
- Coordinates: 47.6659°N 122.3136°W

The University Heights Center is a former school building in the University District of Seattle, Washington, United States. It is located at University Way and 50th Street.

The building was opened in 1903 for University Heights Elementary School.

University Heights elementary school was closed in 1989.

The building is alleged to be haunted.

In 2011 Historic Seattle awarded the organization a preservation award for care in restoring the windows.

In 1991 a p-patch was established at the building.
