= Interbay P-Patch =

Community garden in Seattle, Washington, US

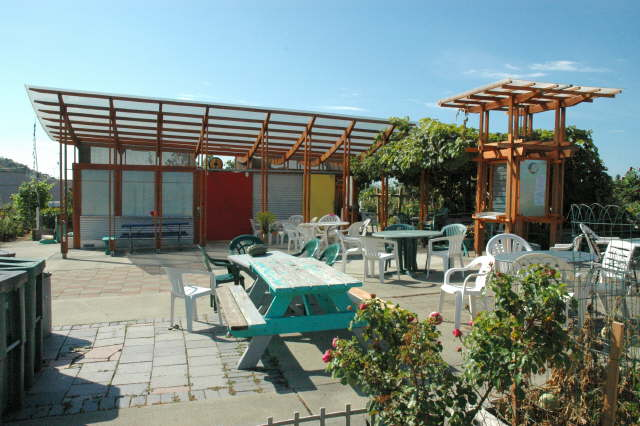
- Interbay P-Patch Garden Shed and Kiosk
- Interactive map of Interbay P-Patch
- Location: Seattle, Washington, U.S.
- Coordinates: 47°38′28″N 122°22′37″W
- Area: 43,000 ft^{2} (4,000 m^{2})
- Opened: 1974

Interbay P-Patch, "The Garden Between The Bays", is one of Seattle, Washington's largest and most involved community gardens, and is recognized as an example of resourcefulness and sustainability.

== History ==
Gardeners originally established the garden in 1974 as one of the earliest P-Patch locations in the city. First located on landfill that is now the northwest corner of the Interbay Family Golf Center's driving range, the garden has moved twice.

In 1980 the Seattle City Council passed a resolution that guaranteed an acre for community gardening on the Interbay landfill. In 1992, however, with gardens established for 18 years, Interbay P-Patch gardeners had to move the P-Patch to the northeast corner of the landfill to make way for a proposed golf course. The soil in the new location was heavy with clay and lacked humus. Gardeners labored to build the soil. Garden volunteers used money from a Neighborhood Matching Grant to build the first tool shed and compost bins. Gardeners also added the food bank area, and built raised beds.

Four years later, in 1996, the city announced new plans for a golf course. With the 1980 resolution still in force, and with broad public support, the City Council adopted a new resolution allocating funding to move the Interbay P-Patch and ensure garden plots equal to or better than the existing gardens. The resolution guaranteed gardeners 18 inches (460 mm) of soil, and raised beds.

In 1997 the Interbay P-Patch was established as a permanent site on its present-day location, extending north from Wheeler Street along 15th Avenue West.

== Features ==
City residents may rent up to 400 square feet (37 m^{2}) of space in the garden from the city annually. Each gardener is requires to work at least 8 hours for the good of the garden to retain their plot. Gardeners may grow whatever they wish except for trees or large bushes, and the produce from each plot remains the property of the gardener. Over 4,400 square feet (410 m^{2}) of garden space along the fences are dedicated to food bank gardening, which traditionally furnishes about two tons of produce to community food banks each year. The east side of the garden features an orchard of plum, pear, and apple trees, many of which gardeners moved from the previous garden location. Honey bee hives are nestled in a secure enclosure near the back of the garden.

Recycling is a part of the garden's culture. The main north–south walkway is made from recycled pavers from Alki Beach, and the main walkway includes granite pavers from South Africa that did not meet the standards for Westlake Mall.

The Rowe family donated the greenhouse to the garden in 2000, and in 2003 the city donated the arbor entrances, which previously served as security enclosures for portable public toilets. Interbay gardeners donated a memorial bench at the north arbor entrance in honor of Claire "Pappy" Watkins, Interbay's late "King of Compost".

Ray Schutte designed and built the cobblestone entrance walkway and planter in 2006 from cobblestones first used as ballast in ships before their installation at Seattle's Occidental Park. When the city redesigned the park, Interbay P-Patch was fortunate enough to receive these cobblestones.

The 30-foot (9 m) aluminum flag pole was one of the original 50 poles placed in front of the 1962 World's Fair Flag Pavilion.

CAST design/build designed Interbay's award-winning tool shed/library/kitchen, completed in 2002. The shed and surrounding open space are the focal point for many community events, including Friday night potlucks, Saturday lunches, a New Year's Day celebration, and several garden fundraisers each year. CAST design/build also designed the kiosk, added in 2004. Lease Crutcher Lewis donated materials, and a grant from Starbucks helped pay for the kiosk. Gardener and facilities Coordinator Bruce Swee designed the kiosk's water feature to honor long-time Interbay gardeners Anne and Mac Magruder, who planted the grape arbor.

The "Gathering Bell" at the edge of the garden's plaza was given to Airgas Nor Pac as thanks for its financial support of cystic fibrosis cure research. Airgas wished to share this with the community and decided to donate it to the Interbay P-Patch in 2006.

Bruce Swee designed the Interbay P-Patch flag donated to the garden by John and Vickie Bjorkman in 2005. Garden fundraising events also funded Bruce Swee's design and construction of the steel gates on the chipper/shredder storage shed in 2007.

Volunteers who garden at Interbay built and maintain the structures and community areas at the garden.
