= Mount Erie (Washington) =

Mountain in Washington (state), United States

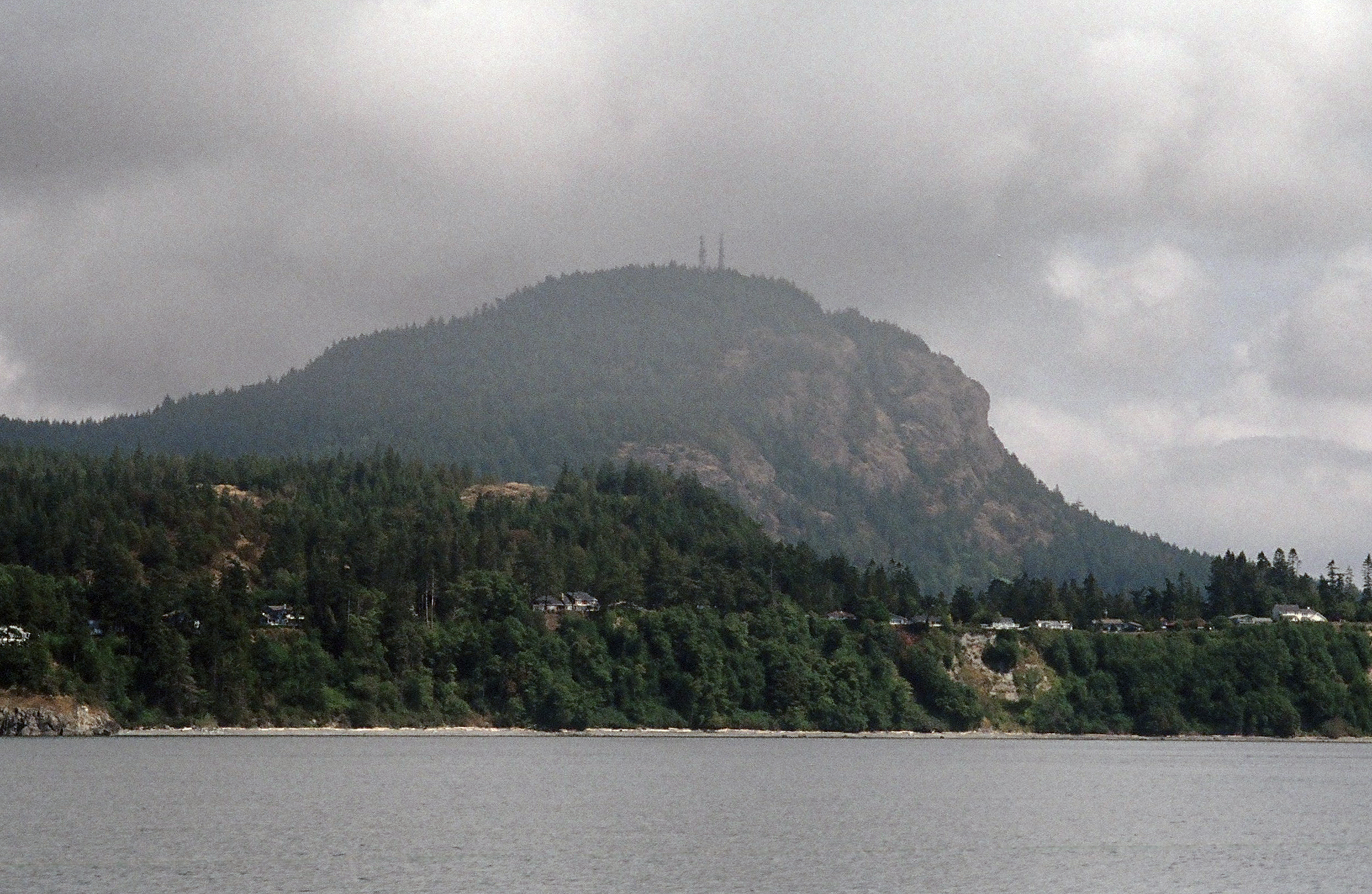
- Mount Erie from Burrows Bay

Highest point
- Elevation: 1,273 ft (388 m) NAVD 88
- Prominence: 1,273 ft (388 m)
- Coordinates: 48°27′14″N 122°37′33″W

Geography
- Location: Skagit County, Washington, U.S.

Climbing
- Easiest route: Paved road

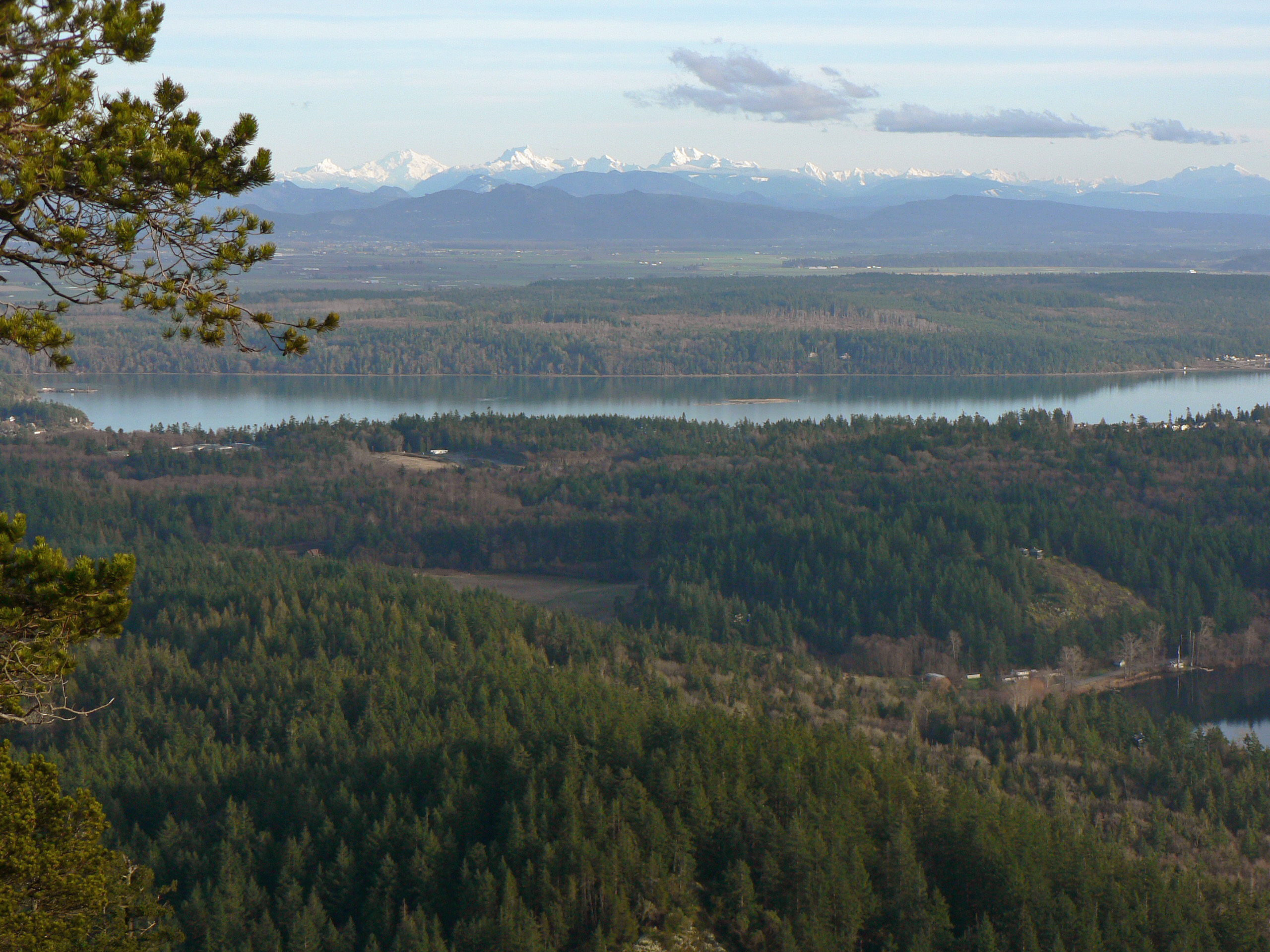
Similk Bay and the Cascade Range from the summit of Mount Erie

Mount Erie is a mountain on Fidalgo Island in Skagit County, Washington, United States. It is on public park land owned and managed by the city of Anacortes and is located in the south of the Anacortes Community Forest Lands.

Mount Erie was named in 1841 by the Wilkes Expedition for the Battle of Lake Erie. The mountain itself was first explored in the 1960s by local climbers, including Dallas Kloke. It is known for its climbing as well as the view from the summit. The summit is accessible via a single-lane, paved road from the base. At 1,273 feet (388 m) tall, Mount Erie is the highest point on Fidalgo Island. On a clear day, Mount Baker, about 43 miles (69 km) to the northeast, and Mount Rainier, about 117 miles (188 km) to the southeast, can be seen from the summit.

== Geology ==
Located near the Fidalgo Complex in Washington's San Juan Islands, Mount Erie has a unique and somewhat puzzling composition. The mountain is composed mostly of feldspar- and hornblende-rich diorite. It is thought to have been formed during the Jurassic period (155–170 Ma) by invasive volcanic flows creating batholithic masses of diorite, which also helped to create the island arcs associated with the San Juan Islands. By the end of the late Jurassic period the area experienced uplift and erosion and was subjected to intense folding and faulting. At this point most of the deposited Paleozoic and Mesozoic sediments had been eroded away, exposing the plutons of diorite, which is the primary igneous rock found on the mountain.

At some point the diorite plutons experienced intrusion by gabbro dikes associated with the formation of oceanic seafloor, indicating that the area may have experienced periods of submersion as the Juan de Fuca plate subducted underneath the North American plate accreted the area. This whole process of constant uplift and erosion followed by accretion is thought to have created the unique ophiolites associated with the San Juan Islands and especially the Fidalgo Complex, of which Mount Erie is a part.

During the Quaternary Period the area experienced many periods of glacial advance and retreat. Evidence for the glacial erosion of Mount Erie can be observed at the summit of the mountain as large striations in the diorite and gabbro. These periods of glacial erosion were separated by warming trends and continue to the present day.

Big Rock in Coupeville, Washington, and the Wedgwood Rock in Seattle, Washington, are both glacial erratics that originated on Mount Erie before being transported to their current locations.

== In popular culture ==
American indie rock band Mount Eerie, known as The Microphones before 2004, is named after the mountain. Principal singer/songwriter Phil Elverum grew up in the area.
