= Peapatch, Virginia and West Virginia =

Unincorporated community in Virginia, United States

Peapatch
- Unincorporated community
- Location within the state of West Virginia Peapatch (the United States)
- Coordinates: 37°17′3″N 81°47′22″W
- Country: United States
- States: West Virginia, Virginia
- County: McDowell (WV), Buchanan (VA)
- Elevation: 2,871 ft (875 m)
- Time zone: UTC−5 (Eastern (EST))
  - Summer (DST): UTC−4 (EDT)
- GNIS ID: 1555320

Peapatch is an unincorporated community in Buchanan County, Virginia and McDowell County, West Virginia, United States, straddling the Virginia–West Virginia border.

== History ==
The Peapatch post office closed in 1939. Peapatch was named from the production of peas.
