= University Prep =

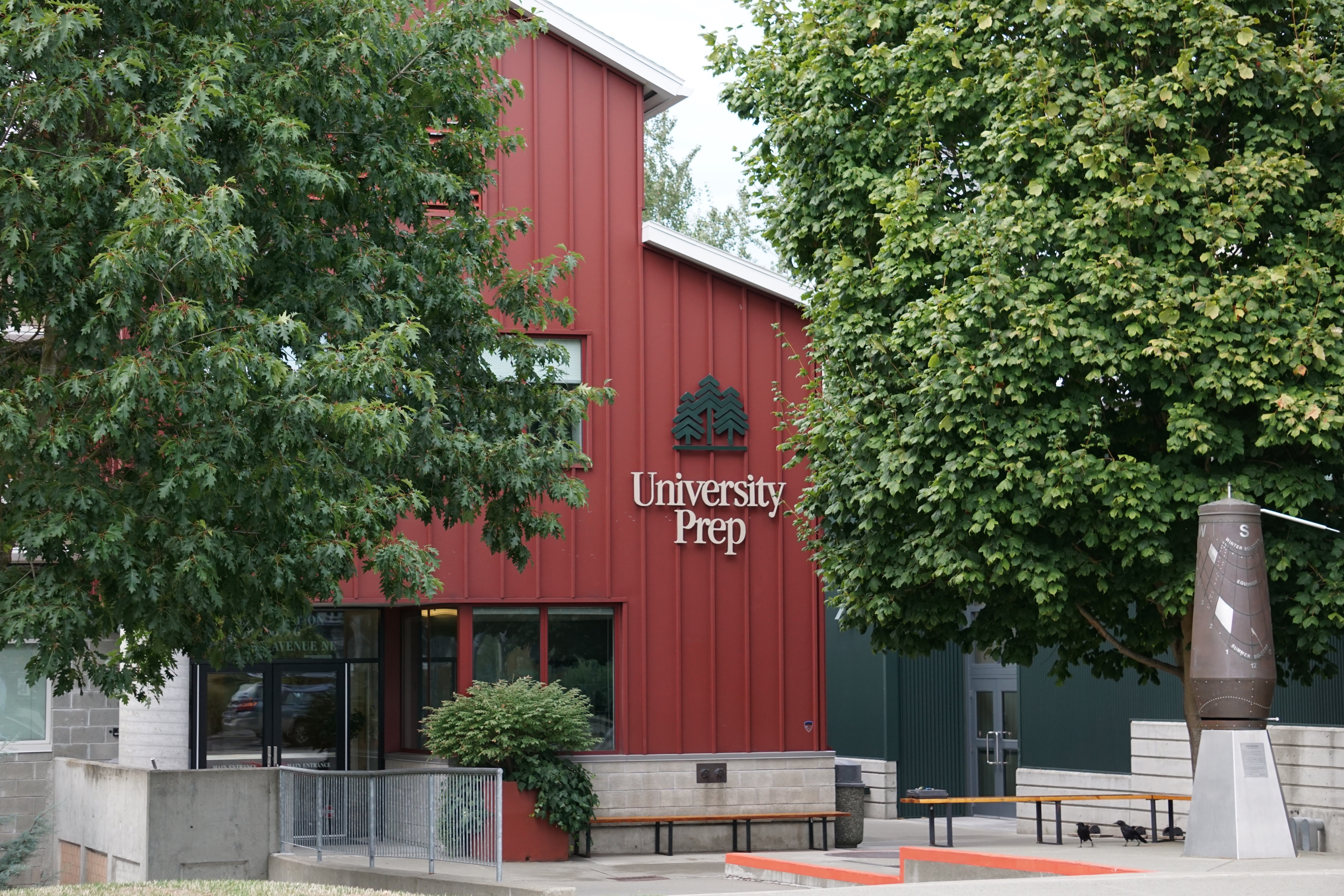
- Main entrance in August 2015

Location
- 8000 25th Avenue NE, Wedgwood; Seattle, Washington 98115; United States; 47.687879°N 122.300004°W

Information
- Other name: UPrep
- Former name: University Preparatory Academy
- Type: Private, middle and high school
- Motto: Lead a Life of Learning
- Established: 1976
- NCES School ID: 01462315
- Head of school: Veronica Codrington-Cazeau
- Teaching staff: 59.3 (on an FTE basis)
- Grades: 6–12
- Gender: Co-educational
- Enrollment: 781
- Student to teacher ratio: 9.1
- Colors: Blue, green, and yellow
- Athletics conference: WIAA SeaKing District Two
- Mascot: Puma
- Newspaper: The Puma Press (Upper School); The Puma Prints (Middle School)
- Affiliation: Northwest Association of Independent Schools
- Website: www.universityprep.org

University Prep (known as UPrep, formerly University Preparatory Academy) is a private, co-educational middle and high school in Wedgwood, Seattle, Washington, United States. As of 2023, school review website Niche ranks University Prep as the fifth best private high school, fourth best college prep private high school, and seventh best high school for STEM in Washington state.

== History ==
University Prep was founded in 1976 by a small group of Seattle Public Schools teachers dedicated to providing the best possible education to a heterogeneous student body. From 2002 to 2014, the head of school of University Prep was Erica L. Hamlin. From 2014 to 2019, the head of school was Matt Levinson. The temporary head of school for the 2019–2020 school year was Lila Lohr. Veronica Codrington-Cazeau has been head of school since July 1, 2020.

== Curriculum ==
The school year is organized into two semesters and four quarters, and students are expected to carry a minimum of five classes each semester. School hours are 8:25 a.m. to 2:55 p.m. for Upper School and 8:15 a.m. to 2:55 p.m. for Middle School, after which athletics, activities, and after-school programs begin. In addition to academic classes, the day includes electives, physical education, supervised study, and free periods for Upper School students. The school transitioned from a Moodle education software client to a Schoology-based learning management system. In Middle School, all students have personal Chromebooks. In Upper School, students may choose either a Windows or Apple computer. In most cases, students are given the option to complete an assignment digitally or on paper. All classes, excluding physical education and fine arts classes, are honors level.

== Sports ==
University Prep competes at the 1A state classification level for sports.

The 2010–2011 school year marked the change of the old sports system. Before that academic year, the Upper School had the same athletics program as the Middle School, with the exception of having tennis. Boys' soccer was moved to the spring season to bring a more competitive level of play, and various other reasons. To counter the absence of boys' soccer in the fall, boys' tennis was added to the fall athletics season.

The school's mascot is the Puma, with a current student paid to wear the suit for sports games, open houses, and other school events.

== Campus ==
UPrep's campus has four main buildings: the three-story classroom and administrative building (including a library, cafeteria, science classrooms, and meeting spaces), a classroom building, a gymnasium, the fine arts center (part of the classroom and administrative building), which features a proscenium theater known as Founder's Hall as well as art and practice rooms, and the ULab which is home to an assortment of classes, a wellness center, as well as a makerspace, equipped with drones, VR headsets, 3D printers and more. The adjacent Dahl Playfield is used for sports and other activities.

== Notable alumni ==
- Sam Cho, politician and entrepreneur
- Benjamin Mako Hill, technologist and author
- Rob Johnson, politician
- Justin Kan, internet entrepreneur and investor
- Emi Meyer, jazz pianist and singer-songwriter
- Jackson Ragen, professional soccer player
- Katherine Reynolds, professional soccer player
