= P-Patch =

Allotment gardens in Seattle, Washington

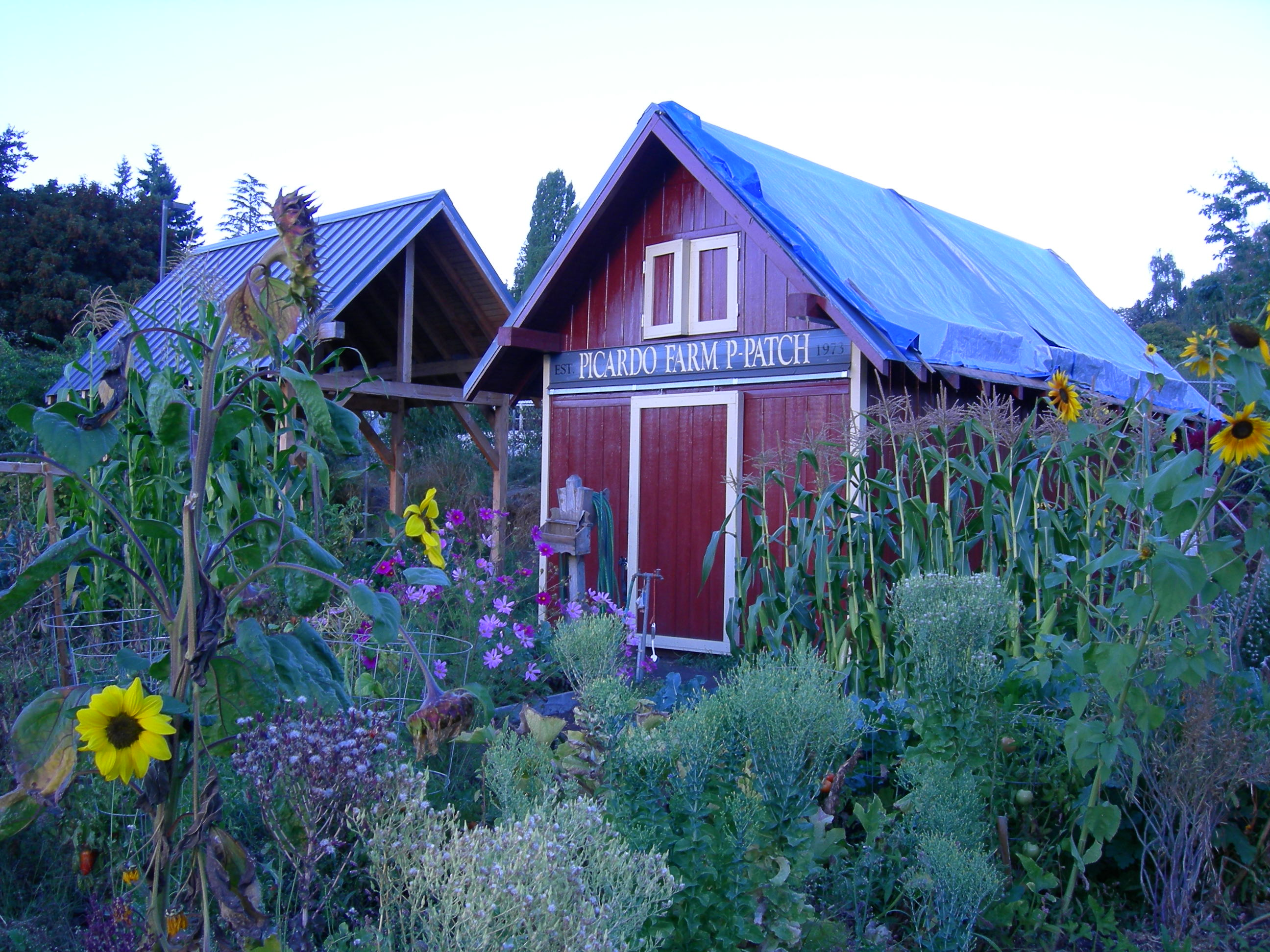
Barn and shelter, Picardo Farm

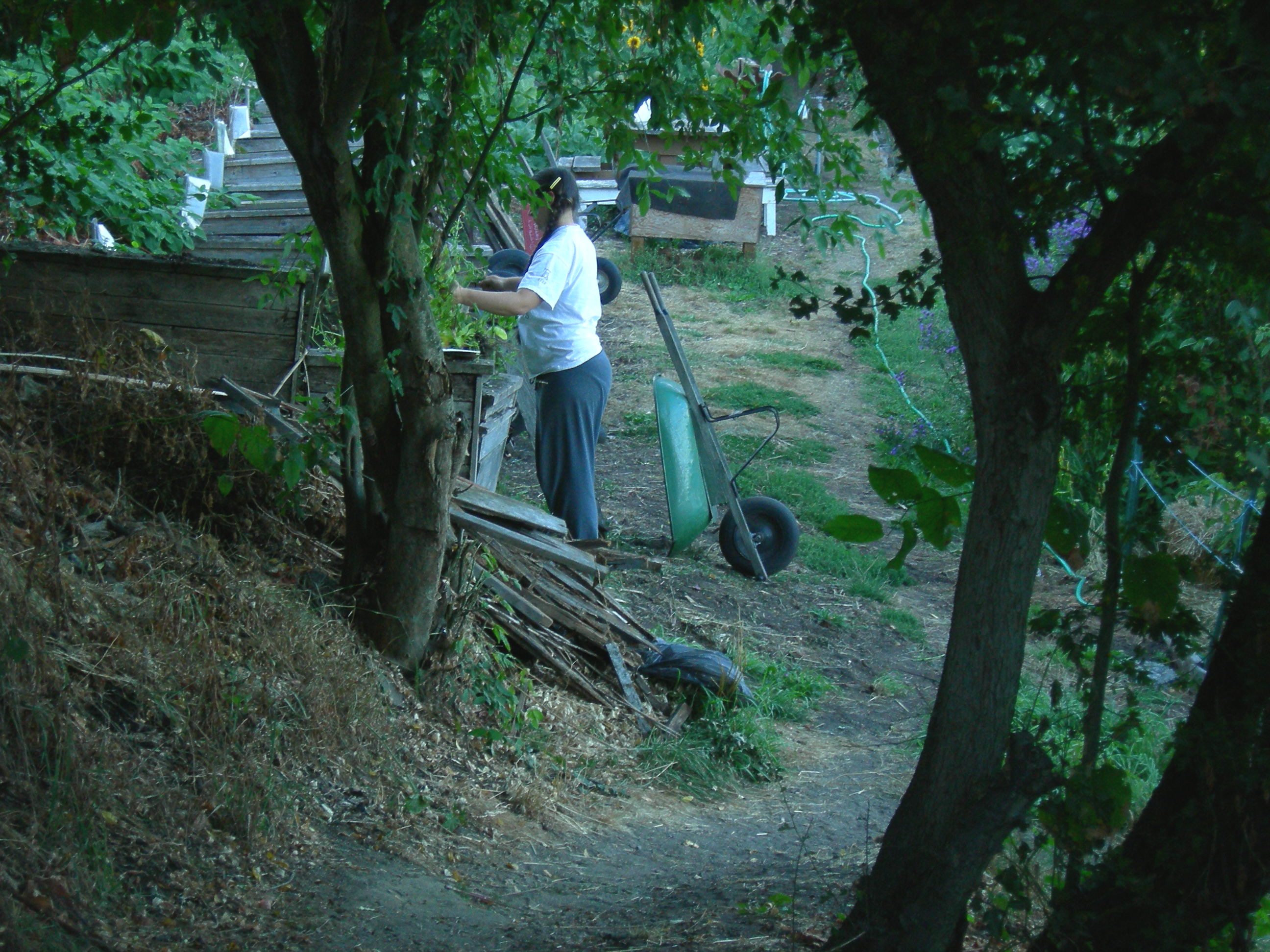
Gardening at Picardo Farm

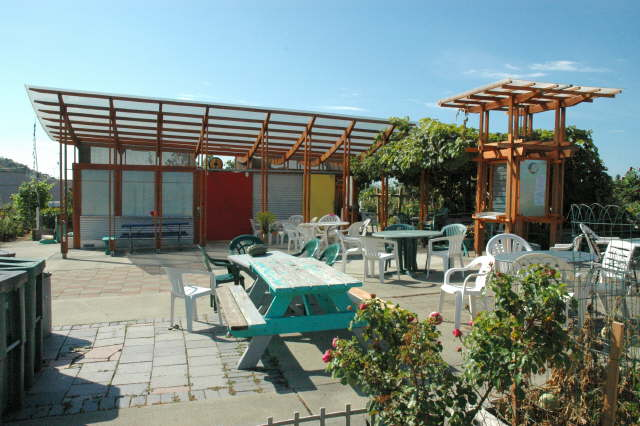
Interbay P-Patch Garden Shed

A P-Patch is a parcel of property used for gardening; the term is specific to Seattle, Washington. The "P" originally stood for "Picardo", after the family who owned Picardo Farm in Seattle's Wedgwood neighborhood, part of which became the original P-Patch. (A folk etymology attributes it to "pea patch".)

The 90 P-Patch locations around the city donated a total of 33,438 pounds (15,167 kg) of produce to food banks and meal programs in 2023. One of the more unique P-Patch locations is atop the Mercer Street parking garage at the Seattle Center, which spans 25,000 square feet (2,300 m^{2}). It opened in 2012 and was slated for closure in 2020, but was saved after community protests.

== List of P-Patches ==
1. Jackson Park, 10th Ave. N.E. & N.E. 133rd St.
2. Pinehurst, 12th Ave. N.E. & N.E. 115th St.
3. Evanston, Evanston Ave. N. & N. 102nd St.
4. Ballard, 25th Ave. N.W. & N.W. 85th St.
5. Picardo Farm, 26th Ave. N.E. & N.E. 82nd St.
6. Burke-Gilman Gardens, 5200 Mithun Pl. N.E.
7. Magnuson, Sand Point Way N.E. & N.E. 70th St.
8. Ravenna, 5200 Ravenna Ave. N.E.
9. Good Shepherd, Bagley Ave. N. & N. 47th St.
10. University District, 8th Ave. N.E. & N.E. 40th St.
11. Interbay, 2451 15th Avenue West
12. Eastlake, 2900 Fairview Ave. E.
13. Colman Park, 32nd Ave. S. & S. Grand St.
14. Snoqualmie, 13th Ave. S. & S. Snoqualmie St.
15. Ferdinand, Columbia Dr. S. & S. Ferdinand St.
16. Delridge, 5078 25th Ave. S.W.
17. University Heights Center, 5031 University Way N.E.
18. Thistle, Martin Luther King Jr. Way S. & S. Cloverdale St.
19. Judkins, 24th Ave. S. & S. Norman St.
20. Republican, 20th Ave. E. & E. Republican St.
21. Alki, 2126 Alki Ave S.W.
22. Bradner Gardens Park, 29th Ave. S. & S. Grand St.
23. Estelle Street, 3400 Rainier Ave. S.
24. Phinney Ridge, 3rd Ave. N.W. & N.W. 60th St.
25. Ida Mia Garden, E. Madison St., 32nd Ave. E. & Lake Washington Blvd. E.
26. Fremont West, Baker Ave. N.W. & N.W. 42nd St.
27. Belltown, Elliott Ave. & Vine St.
28. Queen Anne, 3rd Ave. N. & Lynn St.
29. Hillman City, 46th Ave. S. & S. Lucille St.
30. Hiawatha, S. Dearborn St. & Hiawatha Pl. S.
31. Squire Park, 14th Ave. & E. Fir St.
32. Fremont, Woodland Park Ave. N. & N. 39th St.
33. Cascade, Minor Ave. N. & Thomas St.
34. Thomas Street Gardens, 1010 E. Thomas St.
35. Greenwood, 345 N.W. 88th St.
36. Marra Farm, 4th Ave. S. & S. Director St.
37. Haller Lake, 13045 1st Ave. N.E.
38. Greg's Garden (formerly East Ballard), 14th Ave. N.W. & N.W. 54th St.
39. Immaculate, 18th Ave. & E. Columbia St.
40. Courtland Place, 36th Ave. S. & S. Spokane St.
41. Pelican Tea Garden, E. Mercer St. & 19th Ave. E.
42. Roosevelt, 7012 12th Ave. N.E.
43. Mad P, 30th Ave. E. & E. Mercer St.
44. Queen Pea, 5th Ave. N. & Howe St.
45. Thyme Patch Park, 28th Ave. N.W. & N.W. 58th St.
46. Beacon Bluff, S. Massachusetts St. & 13th Ave. S.
47. Longfellow Creek, 25th Ave. S.W. & S.W. Thistle St.
48. Linden Orchard, Linden Ave. N. & N. 67th St.
49. Brandon Street Orchard, S. Brandon St. & 47th Ave. S.
50. Lincoln Park, Fauntleroy Ave. S.W. & S.W. Webster St.
51. Angel Morgan, S. Morgan St. & 42nd Ave. S.
52. Maple Leaf, 5th Ave. N.E. & N.E. 103rd St.
53. Oxbow Park, Corson Ave. S. & S. Eddy St.
54. Hawkins Garden, E. Jefferson St. & Martin Luther King Jr. Way
55. Genesee, 41st Ave S.W. & S.W. Genesee St.
56. Howell Collective Gardens, 1514 E Howell St

== See also ==
- Allotment (gardening)
- Urban agriculture
