= Frog Rock =

Frog Rock may refer to:

- Frog Rock (Bainbridge Island, Washington), a roadside attraction in the United States
- Frog Rock (Connecticut), a roadside attraction in the United States
- A feature of Weka Pass in New Zealand
- Frog Woman Rock, a feature in the California Coast Ranges, US
- Frog Rock (Kenting), a frog-shaped rock in Kenting National Park, Taiwan

== See also ==
- Rock frog (disambiguation)
