= Battle of the Frogs =

1754 incident and local legend in Windham, Connecticut

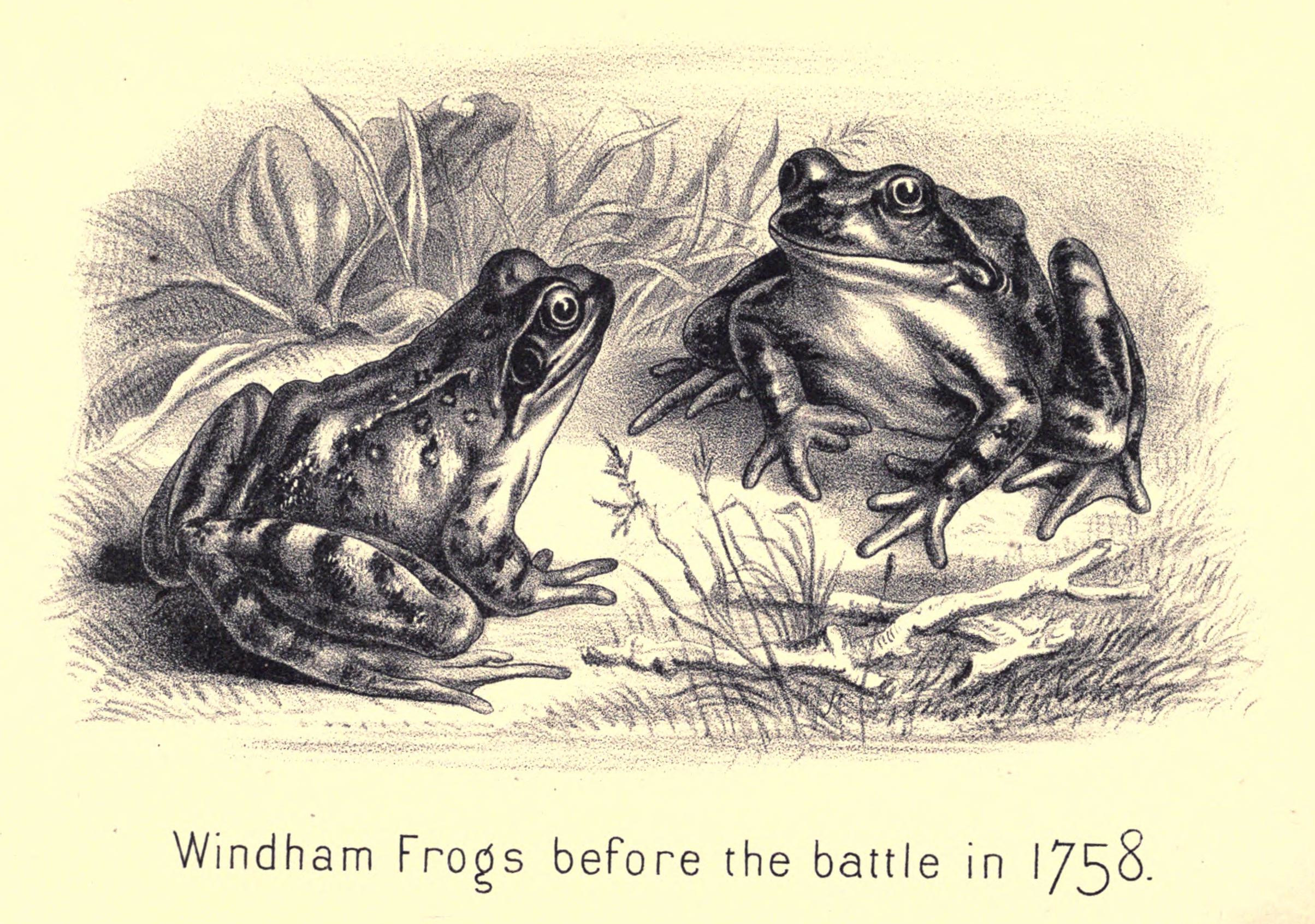
- Illustration from The story of Bacchus, and Centennial souvenir
- Map
- Date: June or July 1754
- Venue: Frog Pond (then Follett's Pond)
- Location: Windham, Connecticut Colony, Thirteen Colonies; 41°42′16″N 72°8′10″W
- Also known as: Windham Frog Fight; Windham Frog Fright
- Type: Local legend
- Cause: Water scarcity or a lekking
- Participants: Townspeople of Windham, bullfrogs
- Deaths: Hundreds to thousands of bullfrogs

The Battle of the Frogs (Note: The incident has also been referred to as the Windham Frog Fight and the Windham Frog Fright.) was a frog-related incident in the Connecticut Colony town of Windham in 1754. (Note: While some accounts give 1758 as the year the Battle of the Frogs took place (John Warner Barber wrote in the 1836 book Connecticut Historic Collections that the incident had occurred in July 1758.), a letter written to Ezra Stiles on July 9, 1754, mentions the incident.)

On a summer night in June or July, the people of Windham were awakened by a mysterious loud noise whose source they could not identify. The French and Indian War had recently broken out and, fearing an attack, a scouting party was sent out to investigate. By the morning, it was discovered that the sound was American bullfrogs, hundreds to thousands of which were found dead in a nearby mill pond.

News of Windham's embarrassing "battle" with the frogs spread throughout the colony and became a running joke in the region. Ballads and exaggerated accounts of the incident proliferated. The townspeople adopted the frog as a mascot of the community, creating a town seal with a frog and using frog vignettes on Windham Bank currency. The comic opera The Frogs of Windham was written about the Battle of the Frogs. The Thread City Crossing in Willimantic is colloquially known as the "Frog Bridge" for the enormous copper frogs that perch at each corner.

Various theories for the behavior of the frogs have been raised. Some sources attest to a severe drought that summer and it has been speculated that the frogs fought among themselves for access to scarce water. Other explanations suggested that there had been an outbreak of disease or a lekking amongst the frogs.

== Night of the battle ==
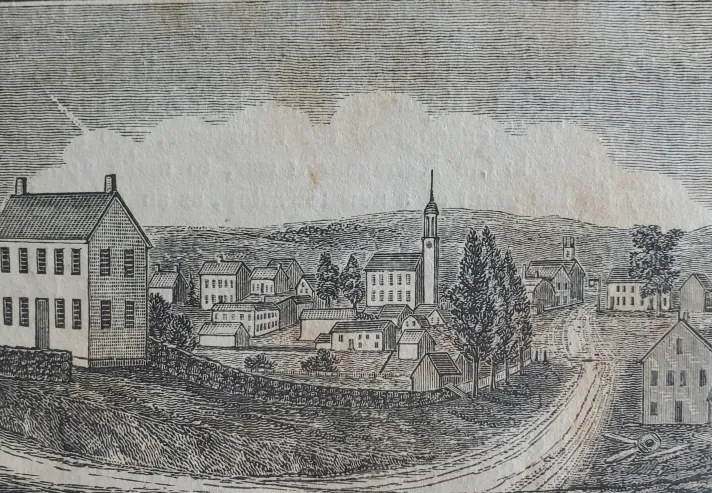
The Village of Windham, c. 1830s

On a summer night in June or July 1754, the townspeople of Windham were awakened by an unusual, cacophonous noise, and were unable to identify the source of the sound. The odd noise seemed to emanate from above and some people heard voices in the noise, thought to be the demands of the supposed attacking force or threats against prominent men in their community. Some accounts claim that the names "Dyer" and "Elderkin" were heard, the names of two of the village's lawyers and colonels. (Note: Colonel Eliphalet Dyer and Colonel Jedediah Elderkin were both Yale graduates and prominent lawyers who had set up offices in Windham.) (Note: A paper read by Thomas Snell Weaver to the Connecticut Historical Society in 1897 asserted that the Dyer referred to in accounts of the "Dyer" name heard by the townspeople actually referred to Colonel Thomas Dyer, and not his son Eliphalet.) The resulting noise was so great that a kind of mass hysteria set in, with some convinced that Armageddon was upon them and others believing that they might be under attack. The French and Indian War had recently broken out, and in anticipation of an attack by the French, Wabanakis, or Algonquins, an armed scouting party was sent out to determine the strength of their enemies.

The scouting party traveled east of the village, over a hill, to Follett's Pond, a mill pond where a large number of bullfrogs (Lithobates catesbeianus) were found to be the source of the raucous noise. The next day, the corpses of hundreds if not thousands of bullfrogs were found. The History of Windham County and the introduction to a ballad mention there had been a severe drought the summer of the incident, drastically reducing the water level in the mill pond.

== Aftermath ==
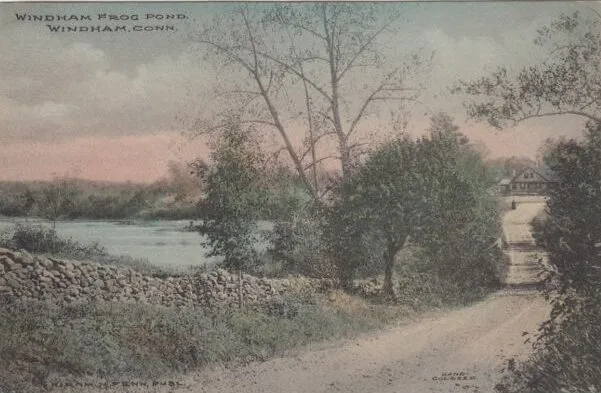
Frog Pond, the site of the battle, c. 1900

While no newspapers appear to have written about the incident at the time, news of the Windham community's frog scare spread throughout the Connecticut Colony. The earliest surviving document mentioning the incident was a July 1754 letter from Abel Stiles to his nephew Ezra Stiles, who later became president of Yale College. The elder Stiles quoted a passage from Ovid's Metamorphoses referring to the Lycian peasants who had been transformed into frogs before mentioning Windham and the bullfrogs:

If the late tragical tidings from Windham deserve credits, as doubtless it doth, it will then concern the gentlemen of your jurisperitian order to be fortified against the dreadfull croaks of the Tauranaon Legions... but pray whence it is that the croaking of a Bull Frogg should so Balshazzarise a Lawyer?—& how Dyarful ye alarm made by these audacious longwinded Croakers!

Windham became the "laughing-stock of the colonies" and its residents suffered ridicule. William Weaver wrote in 1857 that Windhamites could not travel far from home without hearing something about bullfrogs. Ballads were written about the incident, while "rhyme and dogerel [sic] circulated freely". He wrote that "Long and obstinately [fought] was the contest, and many thousands of combatants were found dead on both sides of the ditch the next morning."

The story persisted over the years and spread to other colonies. The tale followed Windham lawyer Eliphalet Dyer throughout his career. Once, upon his arrival at the Second Continental Congress, he was greeted with laughter. Unbeknownst to him, a dead bullfrog had been dangling from the back of his carriage. References to the incident continued into the 19th century. David Hillhouse, writing of his first experience attending an opera in New York in 1826, was initially displeased by the "gibberish and squall, reminding me forcibly of the—battle of the frogs at Windham in ancient days".

Meanwhile, the Windham community adopted the frog as an emblem as the battle became memorialized as a part of the town's folklore. The pond, formerly known as Follett's Pond, was renamed Frog Pond. A town seal featuring the silhouette of a bullfrog was adopted.

According to folklorist Richard Dorson, Windham's adoption of the frog as a symbol was a form of boosterism with the town turning the tale to their advantage and using it to distinguish themselves from other communities. Windham produced postcards depicting gigantic frogs or "worthies in nightdress" conversing with frogs. Dorson says that the Windham Public Library distributes a booklet with one of the ballads devoted to the battle and "places book plates with the frog emblem in its volumes".

== Versions of the tale ==
Many of the accounts of the Battle of the Frogs are quasi-historical, often embellishing or exaggerating aspects of the incident.

=== Account of Samuel Peters ===
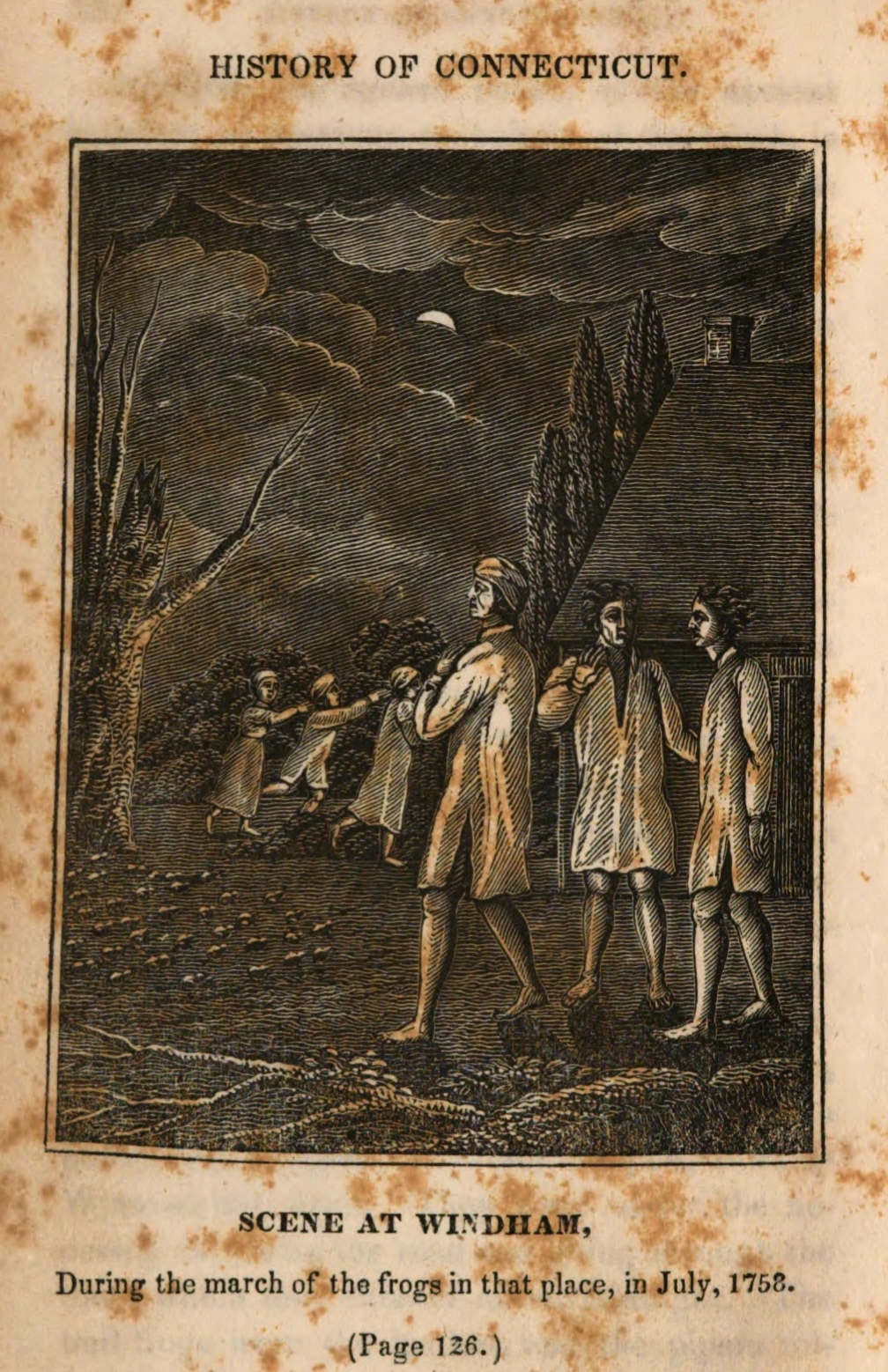
Scene at Windham from General History of Connecticut

The most popular account of the Battle of the Frogs is probably that of the Reverend Samuel Peters, a Loyalist from nearby Hebron who wrote an exaggerated version of the incident in his inaccurate and spiteful General History of Connecticut (1781). Peters was disgraced for his Loyalist sympathies and fled to England in 1774 where he published his embittered history, which was nicknamed The Lying History in Connecticut. In addition to naming one of his ancestors as the founder of Yale, Peters invented animals, claimed that a river was "solid", and fabricated non-existent Blue Laws.

In Peters' account, the Windhamites Eliphalet Dyer and Jedidiah Elderkin figure prominently and are portrayed as "bumbling idiots and comic cowards". Elements from Peters' account of the Battle of the Frogs were incorporated into later ballads and retellings. In his version, the frogs were located about five miles from Windham in "an artificial pond three miles square". He writes that the frogs, having found the water dried up, hopped their way towards the Willimantic River and that they "filled a road forty yards wide for four miles in length," entered Windham around midnight, and were several hours in their passage. In his account, the residents of Windham fled naked from their beds with "worse shrieking than that of the frogs", fearing an earthquake or the "dissolution of nature". Peters relates that the men retreated a half mile and upon their return, heard from the "enemy's camp" voices uttering the words "Wight, Hilderken, Dier, Tete." They only discovered that their attackers were frogs after three men were sent to negotiate.

According to an 1890 review of Peters' account in American Notes and Queries, his prejudices "led him to connive at the dismemberment of Connecticut". Peters, who had Tory sympathies, was forced to leave the country in 1774. The Notes and Queries review noted that Peters had exaggerated the size of Frog Pond and its distance from the town, noting that a migration of frogs would likely have sought out the Shetucket River, which was closer than the Willimantic.

=== Ballads ===
At least three ballads have been written about the Battle of the Frogs. Lebanon residents Stephen and Ebenezer Tilden are credited as the authors of the 1840s ballad "Lawyers and Bull-Frogs". The ballad is introduced as "a true relation of a strange battle between some Lawyers and Bull-Frogs, set forth in a new song written by a jolly farmer of New England." The final verse of the ballad reads, "Lawyers, I say, now from this day, be honest in your dealing. And never more increase your store, while you the poor are killing." Another ballad, called "The Frogs of Windham" and attributed to Arion, was based on Peters' account. A third ballad entitled "The Bull-Frog Fright: A Ballad of the Olden Time" had forty-four stanzas and was published in 1851.

=== Account of William Lawton Weaver ===
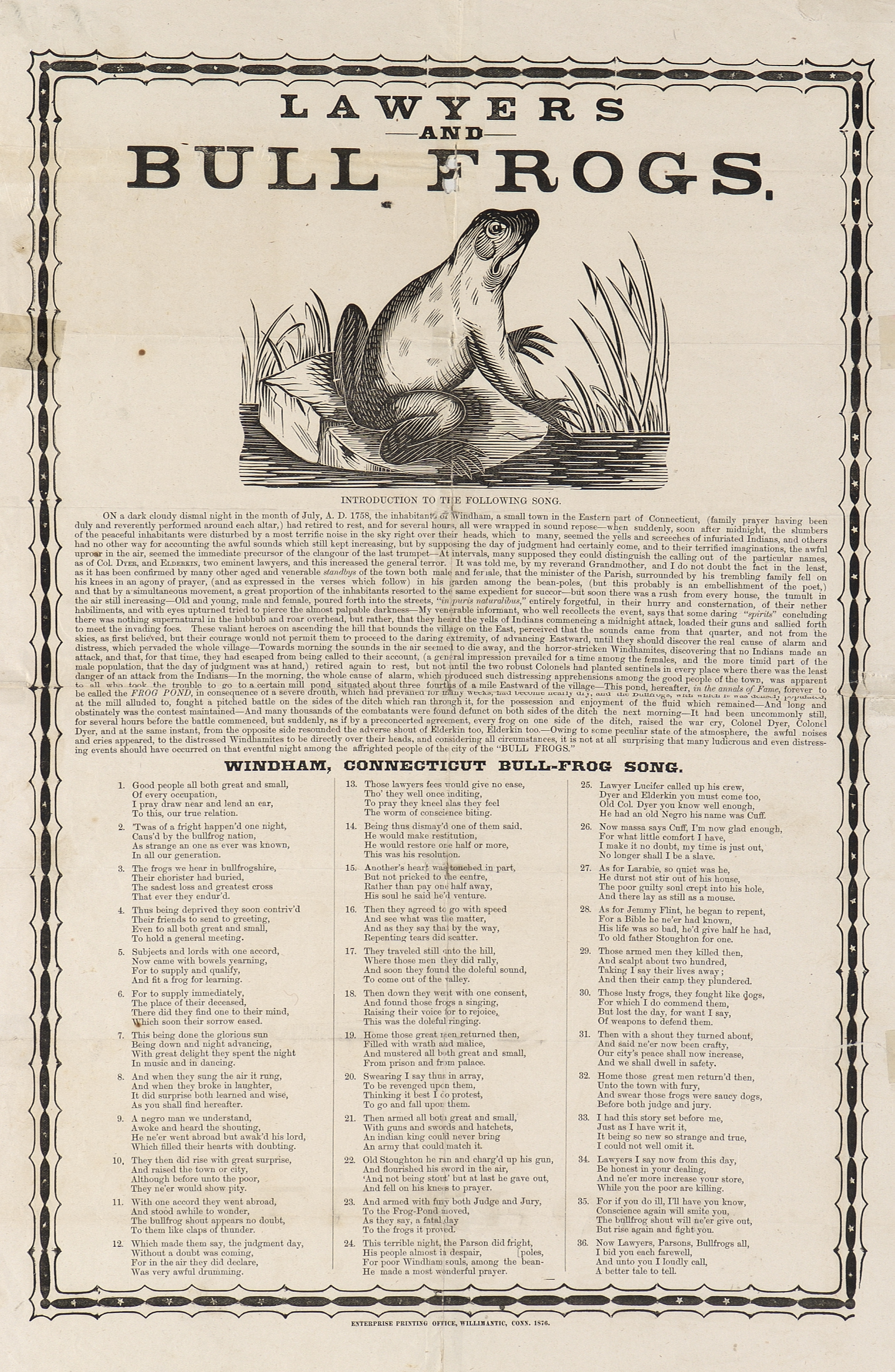
Broadside of the "Lawyers and Bull Frogs" ballad with introduction, c. 1840s

In 1857, William Lawton Weaver compiled the 48-page pamphlet The Battle of the frogs, at Windham, 1758: with various accounts and three of the most popular ballads on the subject. It was published by James Walden in Willimantic. The pamphlet includes the accounts of Samuel Peters, the three ballads, and the account of Abner Follett. In his introduction, Weaver offers his own analysis of the accounts and speculates as to the cause of the disturbance. He describes the events as having occurred after midnight in June or July of 1758 on a foggy night. According to Weaver, the incident took place during the French and Indian War and Colonel Eliphalet Dyer had recently raised a regiment for an expedition against Crown Point under Israel Putnam.

=== Account of Sinda ===
Ellen Douglas Larned, in the second volume of her 1880 History of Windham County, Connecticut, relays the account of Sinda, "wife of Jack, body servant to Colonel Eliphalet Dyer":

Well it was in June, I think, and the weather was very hot, and Master had drawn off the Pond to fix the dam. When he came home he did not think of nothin'—by and by when it became cool there began to be a rumble, rumble, rumble in the air, and it grew louder and louder and louder, and seemed to be like drums beating in the air. Well, it was in the old French War, when our men had gone to Belle Isle or Canada to fight the French and Indians, and some guessed it was the Injuns having a powwow or war dance on Chewink Plain, and we should all be killed in the morning. But Master and Colonel Elderkin and Mr. Gray mounted their horses and rode to the top of Mullein Hill, and as the pond was a little over there beyond they found out what it was—and the scare was over. Master said he supposed the frogs fought each other for the next day there were thousands of them dead. They croaked some the next night but nothing so bad.

— Sinda, History of Windham County, Connecticut: 1760-1880.

=== Account of Abner Follett, Jr. ===
William Lawton Weaver wrote that the account of Abner Follett, Jr. was the most credible. The Follett family had owned the pond at the time of the incident and his father, Abner Follett, Sr. had recalled the incident, although he was young. Weaver wrote that "to those who know Mr. F., it is unnecessary to say that nothing exaggerated or savoring of romance would be stated or entertained by him." Follett disputed that there had been a drought or that the pond had dried up. He said that while there had been no migration of frogs from the pond, their outcry was both thunderous and extraordinary. Those who lived closest to the ruckus reported feeling their beds vibrate beneath them. Follett said that "the whole thing was simply the anvil chorus of a happy family of frogs".

=== Other accounts ===
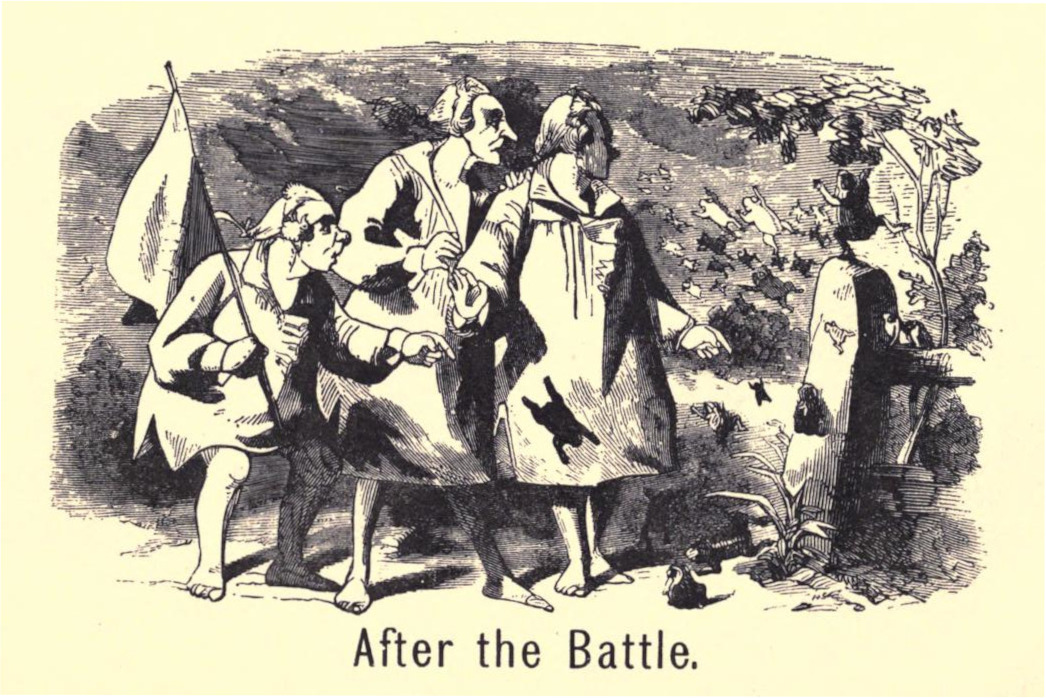
Illustration depicting the aftermath of the battle from The story of Bacchus, and Centennial souvenir, 1876

Historian Jeptha Root Simms wrote about the Battle of the Frogs in his 1846 book The American Spy, Or, Freedoms Early Sacrifice. In Simms' retelling of the tale, after Colonel Dyer climbed the hill to the east of Windham, "his courage failed him, and when he would have advanced eastward, his knees smote their fellows with dangerous collision". Simms compared the fight between the frogs to that of the Kilkenny cats.

The author "Shepherd Tom" also wrote of the Battle of the Frogs. His version of the tale was included in Jonnycake Papers, his 1880 folk tale collection.

== Explanations for the frog behavior ==
Most versions of the story conclude that a drought caused the pond to dry up and that the bullfrogs fought each other, resulting in many deaths. Other explanations that have been offered include an outbreak of disease.

Herpetologist Susan Z. Herrick, who grew up in Windham and has spent over 3,000 hours making field recordings of wild bullfrogs, has speculated that the bullfrogs were making advertisement calls. The bullfrogs, faced with a shrinking shoreline and being pushed together as they lost physical territory, may have shifted their mating strategy and begun lekking in a situation Herrick likened to a mosh pit. With so many males in a small pond, Herrick speculates that "all the males gave up on having any territory at all and focused strictly on at least getting a female. With no coordination of calls, it must have been a God-awful noise, and I think this is what the villagers heard."

At a meeting of the Massachusetts Historical Society in 1925, Allan Forbes reported on the encampments of soldiers from the French Army during the French and Indian War. One such encampment was near Windham and during his tour of the area, Forbes was told by locals that the French had begun hunting frogs after they pitched their tents. From the stories he was told, he concluded that they didn't have much else to eat. One person suggested that the legend of the mass exodus of frogs from the pond was due to them trying to escape the soldiers.

== Legacy ==
The Battle of the Frogs was commemorated in song and verse. Residents of Windham adopted the bullfrog as a symbol, incorporating it into their banknotes, and their town seal. The original plans for the Willimantic town hall, built in the late 19th century, called for the entrance to be guarded by two frogs. During a 1902 visit by President Theodore Roosevelt, a banner commemorating the Battle of the Frogs was displayed. Sometime before 1919, an archway over the road from Willimantic to Windham included two large bullfrogs dressed in green and white uniforms.

High school class rings are also sometimes embossed with frogs. A local high school newspaper is called Croaking and the town seal includes a frog in its design. Historical recitations of the tale are given on the village green in the Windham Center Historic District, especially on significant anniversaries of the battle. In 2005, the Windham Area Arts Collaborative commissioned local artists to decorate about a dozen copies of the frog sculptures from the Frog Bridge. Willimantic has hosted frog jumping contests.

=== Banknotes depicting frogs ===
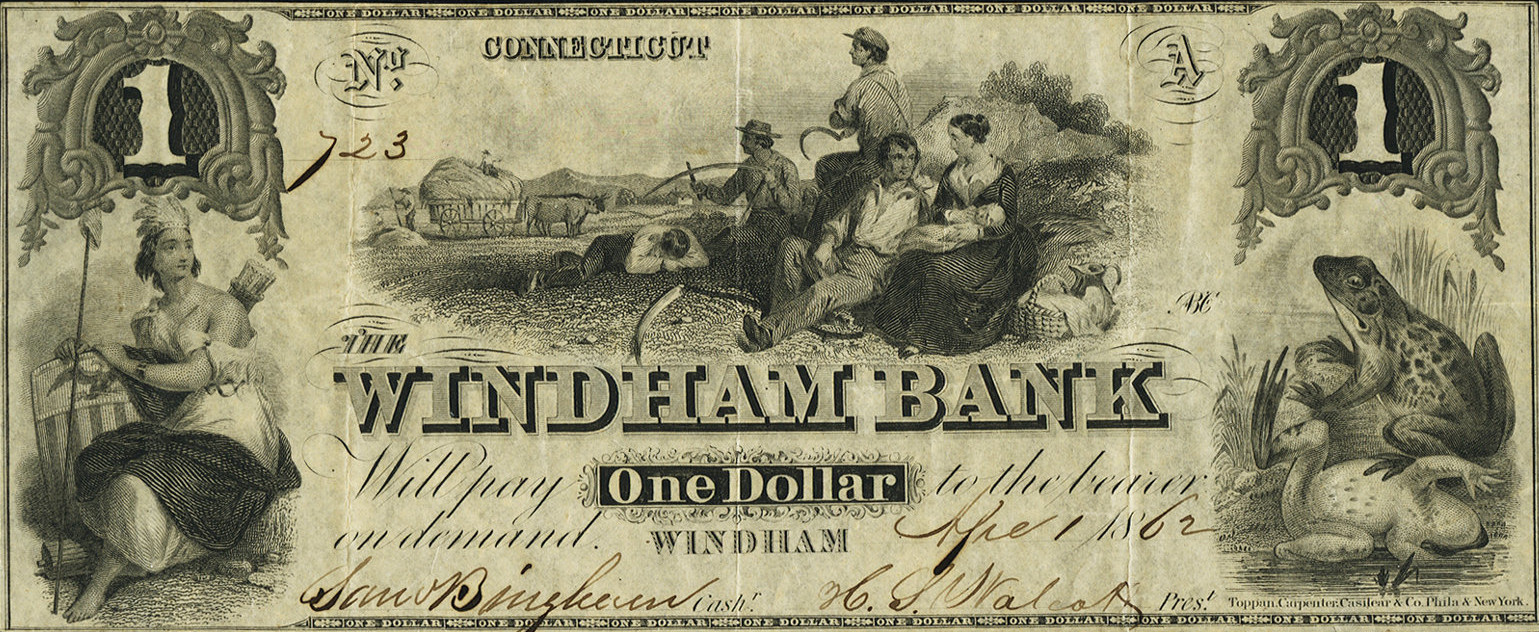
A $1 banknote issued in 1862 by the Windham Bank with a depiction of a dead, belly-up frog with another frog sitting on top of it.

The Windham Bank, chartered in 1832, produced banknotes with a frog vignette. The vignette, prominently featured in the lower right-hand corner of the notes, depicts a frog sitting on top of another upturned and dead frog. The bank included the vignette in its $1, $2, $3, $5, and $10 denominations until the 1870s.

Theron Brown, a poet of Windham, wrote the following verse mentioning the banknotes:

I pause to nurse a quaint remembrance here,
The bank and I were born the self same year.
I mind its notes, between whose figures poked,
Two frogs—so lifelike that they almost croked.
The original greenbacks of the native race,
That long anticipated Salmon Chase.
They blossomed like pond lilies from the mud,
Memento of a war that shed no blood.

— Theron Brown

=== The Frogs of Windham opera ===
The Battle of the Frogs inspired the comic opera The Frogs of Windham. Nason W. Leavitt, who formerly owned the Willimantic Enterprise newspaper, wrote the opera in the 1880s with his son Burton. It was published and copyrighted in 1891.

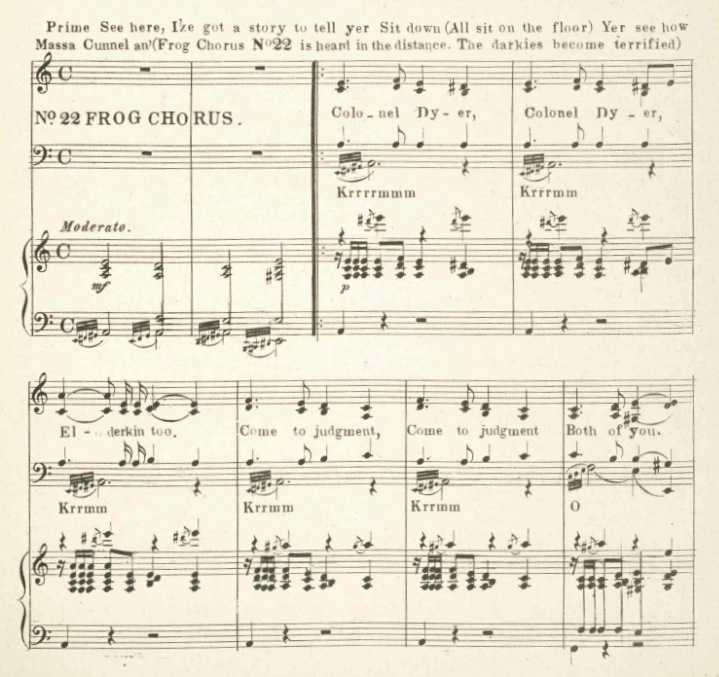
Excerpt of the "Frog Chorus" from the comic opera The Frogs of Windham

The operetta includes a romantic subplot in which Colonel Dyer tries to marry off his daughter to a "weak-minded English youth". Meanwhile, a farm boy who is in love with the daughter plots to have the English lord captured by Mohegan Indians. The frogs are not introduced until the last half of the third act as a "mysterious noise" that Dyer is convinced is a message from God that he should allow his daughter to marry the person she loves. One of Dyer's captains then arrives and announces that the noise was merely a "throng of combative frogs".

The Frogs of Windham was performed throughout Connecticut in the late 1800s and early 1900s. The opera's "Frog Ballet" was reported to have "caused much merriment" and its drinking song "Good Old Windham Flip" honored a local alcoholic concoction. The opera contains numerous ethnic stereotypes, including an "Injun" war dance, a German character named Lim Burger, African American characters who are enslaved by Dyer, dancing gypsies, and an English lord with a speech disorder.

An updated production of The Frogs of Windham debuted in 1983 for the sesquicentennial of Willimantic's incorporation. The Sesquicentennial Fine Arts Committee used state and city grants to finance the set and costumes. Kramer Middle School teacher Robert Brouillard called the operetta "a director's nightmare," noting its amateurish libretto and comparing the opera to the fictional musical Springtime for Hitler. Brouillard rewrote the story, which was "riddled with racial and ethnic epithets". The production included antique muskets as props and featured the Windham Community Orchestra as well as choreography by Windham Ballet artistic director Barbara Johnson. University of Connecticut music professor David Maker provided the orchestration that the score had previously lacked. The Windham Theatre Guild revived the work in 1992. The operetta's 82-page piano score is held by the Library of Congress.

=== Frog Bridge ===
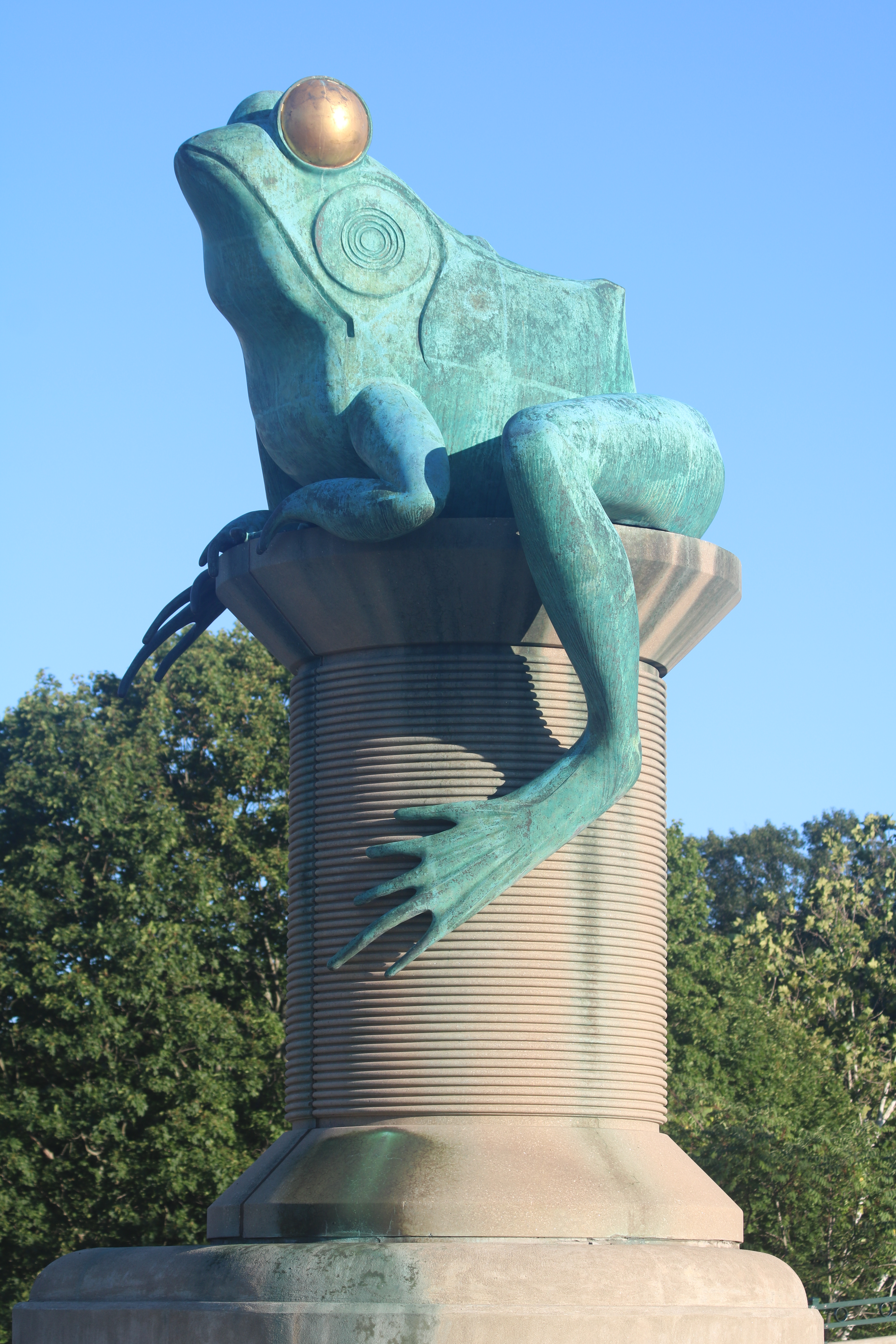
One of four frog statues located at each corner of the Frog Bridge in Willimantic

The Thread City Crossing, commonly known as the Frog Bridge, is a bridge in Willimantic that spans the Willimantic River. The bridge was completed in 2000 and features four 11-foot (3.4 m) tall copper frogs atop giant concrete spools at each corner of the bridge. Designed by artist Leo Jensen, the lazily perched frogs pay homage to the Battle of the Frogs and are named Manny, Willy, Windy and Swifty.

William H. Grover, who was asked to create designs for the bridge, initially produced a Victorian theme with spools to represent Willimantic as the home of the American Thread Company. Windham Planning Commission chair David E. Philips, who wrote the 1984 book Legendary Connecticut, suggested incorporating frogs into the design. Willimantic residents also offered suggestions for the bridge. One returned from Serbia with a travel brochure for the Dragon Bridge in Slovenia, which has dragons at either end that, according to local legend, are supposed to wag their tails when virgins walk across. In response to the suggestion, Margaret P. Reich, executive director of the Windham Regional Planning Agency, said "we'd like to create a similar urban legend, but with frogs—and probably not involving virgins."
