= Rock frog =

Rock frog may refer to:

- Barahona rock frog (Eleutherodactylus alcoae), a frog in the family Leptodactylidae found in the Dominican Republic and Haiti
- Copland's rock frog (Litoria coplandi), a frog in the family Hylidae endemic to Australia
- Doi Inthanon rock frog (Amolops archotaphus or Rana archotaphus), a frog in the family Ranidae found in Laos, Thailand, and possibly Vietnam
- Kirtisinghe's rock frog (Nannophrys marmorata), a frog in the family Dicroglossidae endemic to Sri Lanka
- Masked rock frog (Litoria personata), a frog in the family Hylidae endemic to Australia
- Puerto Rican rock frog (Eleutherodactylus cooki), a frog in the family Leptodactylidae found in Puerto Rico
- Rock haunting frog (Cophixalus saxatilis), a frog in the family Microhylidae endemic to Australia
- Sri Lanka rock frog (Nannophrys ceylonensis), a frog in the family Dicroglossidae endemic to Sri Lanka

== See also ==
- Frog Rock (disambiguation)
