= Frog Rock (Connecticut) =

Painted glacial erratic landmark in Eastford, Connecticut

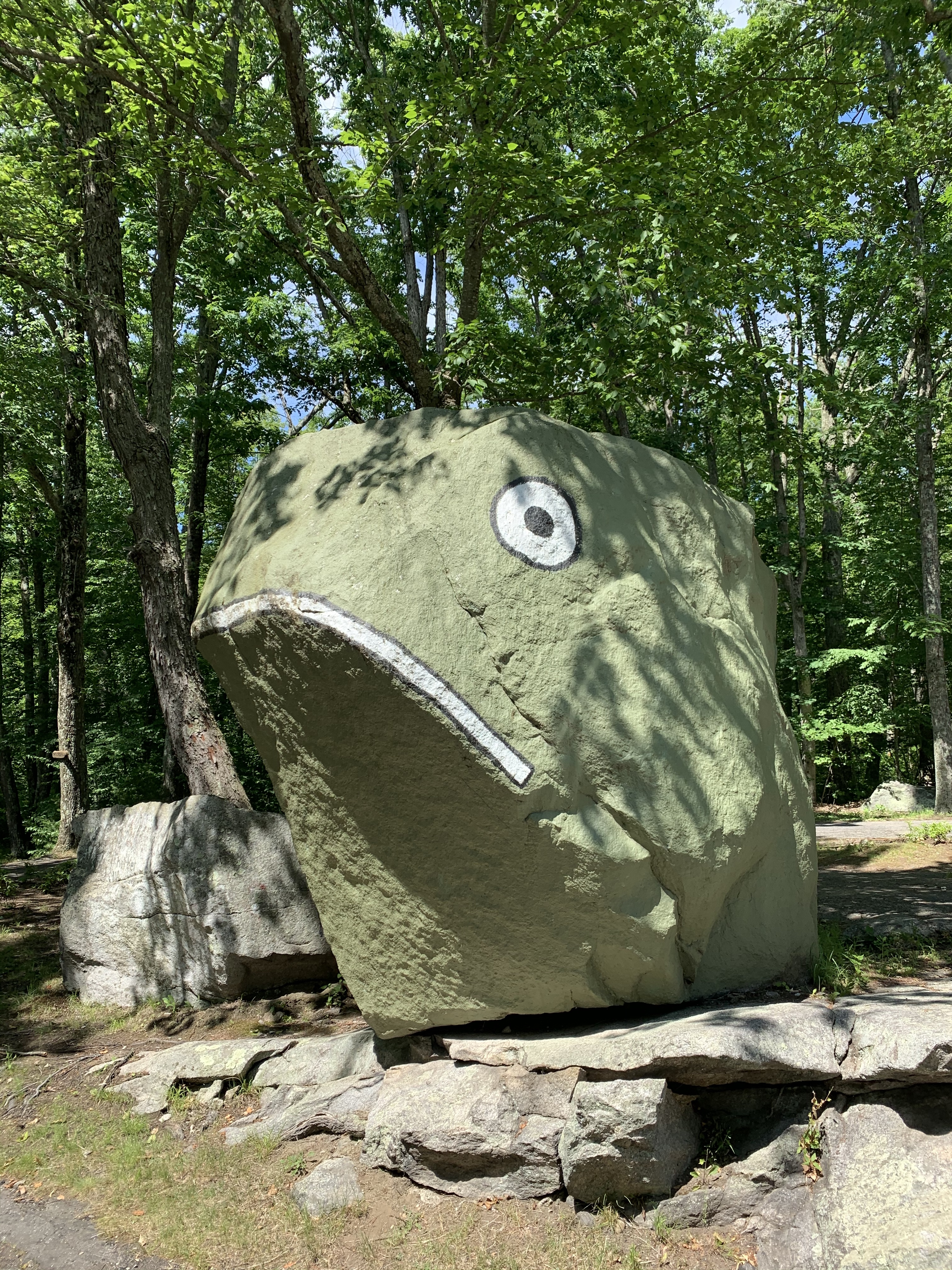
- Interactive map of Frog Rock
- Location: 212 Pomfret Road; Eastford, Connecticut
- Coordinates: 41.869277°N 72.052195°W
- Type: Boulder
- Material: Glacial erratic
- Completion date: 1881
- Restored date: 1997, 2012

Frog Rock is a landmark located on a privately owned roadside park off U.S. Route 44 in Eastford, Connecticut. The rock is a large glacial erratic painted green with a white lip and eyes to resemble a lugubrious frog. The rock was first painted and turned into an attraction in 1881 by state legislator Thomas J. Thurber (a Republican from Putnam), who passed the rock frequently on trips to Hartford and observed that it resembled the shape of a squatting frog. The location became a popular roadside picnic area for many years for travelers between Providence and Hartford. In 1997 a group of Thurber's descendants repainted it, vowed to maintain Frog Rock in perpetuity, and added a memorial to Thurber on a nearby rock.

After road work left Frog Rock further from traffic and left the site prone to vandalism, the State of Connecticut offered the land to neighboring towns. Receiving no offers, the state put the site up for sale. In 2012, Joe Lernould bought the 2.5-acre wooded rest stop from the state for $27,000 and then opened a small seasonal antiques store, gift shop, and food truck. Lernould reported four thousand visitors in 2013 alone. The site is popular for picnics due to its five historic concrete picnic tables, and sometimes features live music. It is open Thursday-Sunday, May through September.

== See also ==
- List of individual rocks
- Battle of the Frogs
- Frog Rock (Bainbridge Island, Washington)
