= Frog Rock (Kenting) =

Rock in Hengchun, Pingtung County, Taiwan

Frog Rock 墾丁青蛙石
- Rock formation
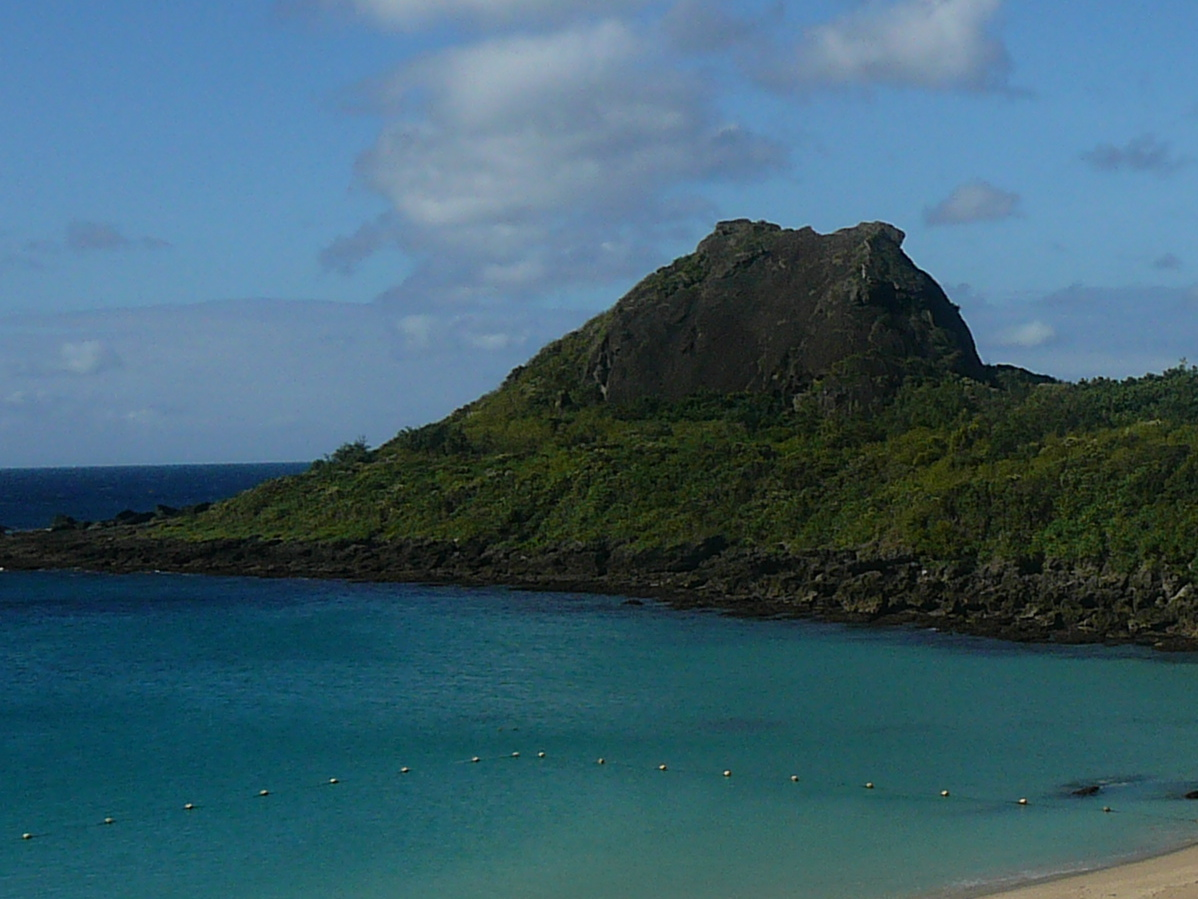

- Coordinates: 21°56′20.1″N 120°48′04.3″E
- Location: Hengchun, Pingtung County, Taiwan
- Geology: rock
- Surface elevation: 61 m (200 ft)

The Frog Rock (traditional Chinese: 墾丁青蛙石; simplified Chinese: 垦丁青蛙石; pinyin: Kěndīng Qīngwā Shí) is a rock in Hengchun Township, Pingtung County, Taiwan. The rock is part of Kenting National Park.

== History ==
The rock is originally external rocks brought by Kenting argillite. The rocks were wrapped in it, but gradually became exposed, and became an independent rock because of continuous erosion by wind and sea water.

== Geology ==
The rock is 61 meters in height with the shape of a frog jumping into the sea. It is surrounded by various volcanic rock gravels.

== See also ==
- Geology of Taiwan
