= Samuel Peters (clergyman) =

American reverend (1735–1826)

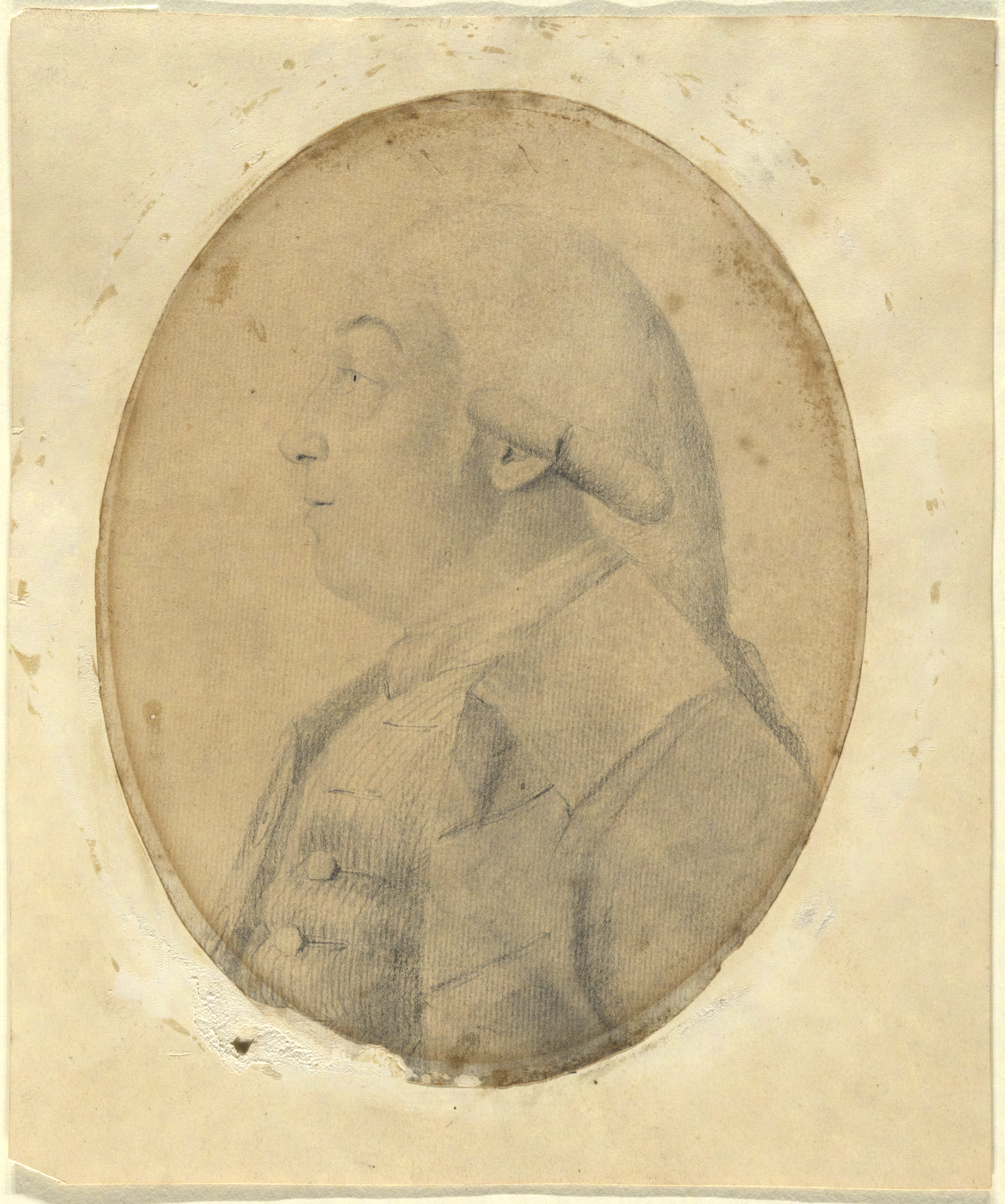
- Samuel Peters, c. 1700s
- Born: Samuel Andrew Peters; December 1, 1735; Hebron, Connecticut Colony
- Died: April 19, 1826 (aged 90); New York City, U.S.
- Education: Yale College
- Spouses: Hannah Owen (m. 1760–1765) Abigail Gilbert (m. 1769–1769) Mary Birdseye (m. 1773–1774)
- Children: 4
- Religion: Anglicanism
- Church: St. Peter's Church, Hebron, Connecticut

Samuel Andrew Peters (December 1, 1735 – April 19, 1826) was a Connecticut Anglican clergyman and historian. Born in 1735 in Hebron, Connecticut, he graduated from Yale College and became the local minister at St. Peter's Church in the town. Politically, he was a loyalist who was driven out of Hebron by the Sons of Liberty. He moved to England in response to that. In 1787, he tried to pay off his debts by selling his enslaved Africans, Cesar and Lowis. Twice prevented from doing so by the local townsmen, he relented. In 1805, he moved to New York City to pursue a property claim in the area that later became Minneapolis, but that venture failed. He returned to New York and died in poverty there on April 19, 1826.

== Biography ==
Samuel Peters was born December 1, 1735, in Hebron, Connecticut Colony, being the third youngest of twelve children of John Peters and Mary Marks.

In 1757, he graduated from Yale College and was elected Rector of St. Peter's Church, Hebron, Connecticut. In 1758 he sailed to England where he was ordained Deacon in March 1759, before being advanced to the Anglican Priesthood a month later. In the following year he returned to America and took charge of St. Peter's Church parish at Hebron, Connecticut. In 1763, he climbed Killington Peak, and allegedly named the area Verd Mont giving the state its future name.

In August 1774, Peters fled to England after several visits from the "Sons of Liberty" because of his Loyalist sympathies. In 1781, he published, under a pseudonym, "General History of Connecticut, from its first settlement under George Fenwick, to its latest period of amity with Great Britain prior to the Revolution; including a description of the country, and many curious and interesting anecdotes. With an appendix, pointing out the causes of the rebellion in America; together with the particular part taken by the people of Connecticut in its promotion. By a Gentleman of the Province". This work is noted for its unflattering descriptions of the colonists and for its misrepresentation of the Connecticut Blue Laws. The work was popular but criticized for being inaccurate and spiteful.

In 1787, Peters made an attempt to sell off his properties, including his enslaved Africans, Cesar and Lowis Peters, in Hebron to help pay off his debts. By this point, his former house has been occupied by Cesar and Lowis. Six people went to Hebron. Two of them were appointed agents while the other four were slave owners who sought to capture Cesar and Lowis. After the town questioned their actions, they brandished their weapons and left with the captured couple. A local tailor and friend of theirs, Elijah Graves, falsely accused Cesar and Lowis of theft so they would be able to remain in Hebron. The resulting legal situation prevented the agents from taking them away. Samuel Peters later attempted to take them, but Graves made another false accusation which prevented that. Cesar and Lowis were later emancipated on January 1, 1789.

During his exile, Peters made several attempts to become a bishop. He unsuccessfully tried for the position in both Nova Scotia and Quebec. Peters made a final attempt to become a bishop in Vermont. He was invited to lead it on February 27, 1794. The previous candidate, Edward Bass, refused and Peters was suggested by a friend of his, John Graham. However, he had opponents in England who tried to prevent his consecration. Since American Anglican bishops, needed to be confirmed by the church hierarchy in England, Peters was unable to become bishop. His supporters in Vermont ceased supporting him in 1796.

Peters returned to America in 1805 and settled in New York City. He returned to acquire land. During the 1810s, he inherited a land claim in the area that later became Minneapolis from an explorer who he had befriended. He named this area "Petersylvania". However, this venture failed, as the land was not actually the explorer's to give away. He died in poverty in New York City on April 19, 1826.

== Marriages and issue ==
- February 14, 1760: First marriage to Hannah Owen (1740–1765) who bore him three daughters.
- June 25, 1769: Second marriage to Abigail Gilbert (1751–1769).
- April 20, 1773: Third marriage to Mary Birdseye (1750–1774) who bore him one son.

== General and cited sources ==
- "Changing Sentiments on Slavery in Colonial Hebron". Connecticut History. 9 February 2020. Archived from the original on 6 June 2023.
- Cohen, Sheldon S. (1976). Connecticut's Loyalist Gadfly: The Reverend Samuel Andrew Peters. Hartford, Connecticut: American Revolution Bicentennial Commission of Connecticut. hdl:11134/30002:5343973. ISBN 9780918676023. OCLC 3273190.
- McCalla, Donna. "Cesar & Lowis Peters". Hebron Historical Society. Archived from the original on 19 August 2023.
- Middlebrook, Samuel (March 1947). "Samuel Peters: A Yankee Munchausen". The New England Quarterly. 20 (1): 75–87. doi:10.2307/361731. ISSN 0028-4866. JSTOR 361731. S2CID 147168397.
- Starr, Tena (29 September 2010). "Do warriors haunt the ruins on Pisgah?". The Chronicle. Barton, Vermont. p. 1B. ISSN 0746-438X.
