= Frog Rock (Bainbridge Island, Washington) =

Rock on Bainbridge Island, Washington, United States

- Glacial erratic rock
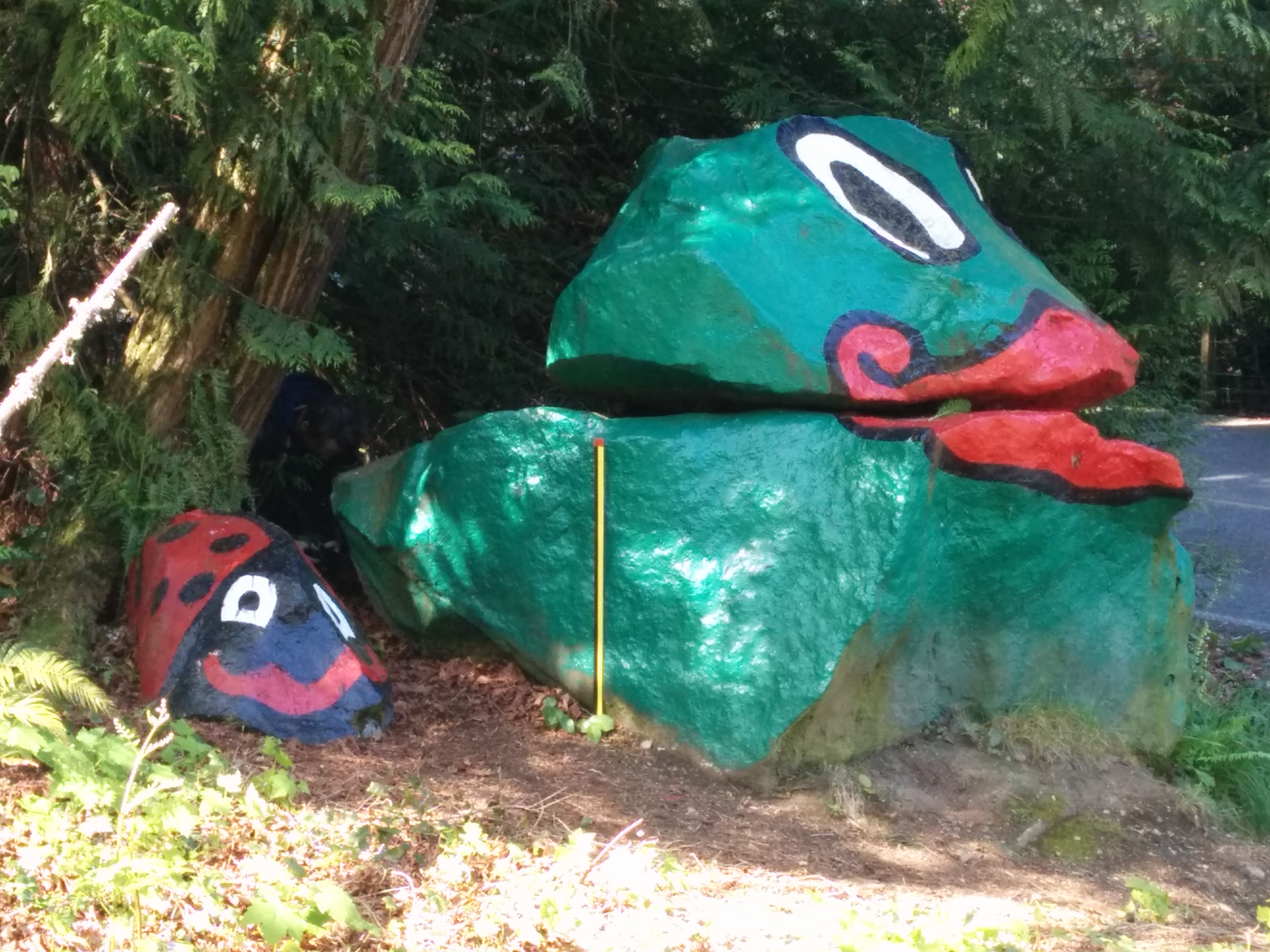
- Coordinates: 47°41′46″N 122°31′24″W

Frog Rock is a glacial erratic on Bainbridge Island, Washington. The frog shape is made of two stacked granite boulders, painted by a pair of local residents to resemble a frog on June 6, 1971. The pair of boulders were reportedly once a single boulder which was dynamited in the 1950s or earlier, in order to remove it from a road right-of-way. After the dynamiting, the rock was known as "Split Rock".

The rock is locally famous, known to be a humorous historic marker, and a notable visitor attraction. It is used by bicyclists as a regrouping point.

A local "resiliency forum" is named for it.

Frog Rock was approved for the Washington State Heritage Register in September 2026.

== See also ==
- List of individual rocks
- Frog Rock (Connecticut)
