= Blue Laws (Connecticut) =

Statues governing conduct in the Colony of Connecticut

The Blue Laws of the Colony of Connecticut are an invented set of harsh statutes governing conduct in the Puritan colony, listed in a history of Connecticut that was published in 1781 in London by the Reverend Samuel Peters, an Anglican who had been forced to leave America. Peters' book popularized the term "blue laws", referring to laws restricting activities on Sunday.

== Background ==
Peters was an Anglican priest hostile to the cause of American independence and had been forced to flee to London in late 1774, shortly before the Revolutionary War began; he made up 45 harsh laws as a hoax to discredit America as backwards and fanatical, and in 1781 published them in a book called A General History of Connecticut, which contains numerous other tall tales.

According to Peters the blue laws "were never suffered to be printed", but especially in the 19th century they were confused with the Code of 1650 of the colonists of Connecticut and with the statutes drafted in 1655 by Governor Theophilus Eaton for the then unconnected Colony of New Haven, for which he drew on the writings of the Reverend John Cotton and the laws of the Massachusetts Bay Colony, and which were printed in London in blue covers for the use of the colonists.

Peters was probably the first to popularize the term "blue laws". Its etymology is unclear, but he implied a relationship to the expletive "bloody", saying that they "were very properly termed Blue Laws, i.e. Bloody Laws, for they were all sanctified with excommunication, confiscation, fines, banishment, whippings, cutting off the ears, burning the tongue, and death."

== Supposed Connecticut Blue Laws ==
1. The Governor and Magistrates convened in general Assembly, are the supreme power under God of this independent Dominion.
2. From the determination of the Assembly no appeal shall be made.
3. The Governor is amenable to the voice of the people.
4. The Governor shall have only a single vote in determining any question; except a casting vote, when the Assembly may be equally divided.
5. The Assembly of the People shall not be dismissed by the Governor, but shall dismiss itself.
6. Conspiracy against this Dominion shall be punished with death.
7. Whoever says there is power and jurisdiction above and over this Dominion, shall suffer death and loss of property.
8. Whoever attempts to change or overturn this Dominion, shall suffer death.
9. The judges shall determine controversies without a jury
10. No one shall be a freeman, or give a vote, unless he be converted, and a member in full communion of one of the Churches allowed in this Dominion.
11. No man shall hold any office, who is not sound in the faith, and faithful to this Dominion; and whoever gives a vote to such a person, shall pay a fine of £1; for a second offence, he shall be disfranchised.
12. Each freeman shall swear by the blessed God to bear true allegiance to this Dominion, and that Jesus Christ is the only King.
13. No quaker or dissenter from the established worship of this Dominion shall be allowed to give a vote for the election of Magistrates, or any officer.
14. No food or lodging shall be afforded to a Quaker, Adamite, or other Heretic.
15. If any person turns Quaker, he shall be banished, and not suffered to return but upon pain of death.
16. No Priest shall abide in this Dominion: he shall be banished, and suffer death on his return. Priests may be seized by any one without a warrant.
17. No one to cross a river, but with an authorized ferryman.
18. No one shall run on the Sabbath day, or walk in his garden or elsewhere, except reverently to and from meeting.
19. No one shall travel, cook victuals, make beds, sweep house, cut hair, or shave, on the Sabbath day.
20. No woman shall kiss her child on the Sabbath or fasting day.
21. The Sabbath shall begin at sunset on Saturday.
22. To pick an ear of corn growing in a neighbor's garden, shall be deemed theft.
23. A person accused of trespass in the night shall be judged guilty, unless he clear himself by his oath.
24. When it appears that an accused has confederates, and he refuses to discover them, he may be racked.
25. No one shall buy or sell lands without permission of the selectmen.
26. A drunkard shall have a master appointed by the selectmen, who are to debar him from the liberty of buying and selling.
27. Whoever publishes a lie to the prejudice of his neighbor, shall sit in the stocks, or be whipped fifteen stripes.
28. No minister shall keep a school.
29. Every rateable person, who refuses to pay his proportion to the support of the Minister of the town or parish, shall be fined by the Court £2, and £4 every quarter, until he or she pay the rate to the Minister.
30. Men-stealers shall suffer death.
31. Whoever wears clothes trimmed with gold, silver, or bone lace, above two shillings by the yard, shall be presented by the grand jurors, and the selectmen shall tax the offender at £300 estate.
32. A debtor in prison, swearing he has no estate, shall be let out and sold, to make satisfaction.
33. Whoever sets a fire in the woods, and it burns a house, shall suffer death; and persons suspected of this crime shall be imprisoned, without benefit of bail.
34. Whoever brings cards or dice into this dominion shall pay a fine of £5.
35. No one shall read Common-Prayer, keep Christmas or saints-days, make minced pies, dance, play cards, or play on any instrument of music, except the drum, trumpet, and the jaw harp.
36. No gospel Minister shall join people in marriage; the magistrates only shall join in marriage, as they may do it with less scandal to Christ's Church.
37. When parents refuse their children convenient marriages, the Magistrates shall determine the point.
38. The selectmen, on finding children ignorant, may take them away from their parents, and put them into better hands, at the expense of their parents.
39. Fornication shall be punished by compelling the marriage, or as the Court may think proper.
40. Adultery shall be punished by death.
41. A man that strikes his wife shall pay a fine of £10; a woman that strikes her husband shall be punished as the Court directs.
42. A wife shall be deemed good evidence against her husband.
43. No man shall court a maid in person, or by letter, without first obtaining consent of her parents: £5 penalty for the first offence; £10 for the second; and, for the third, imprisonment during the pleasure of the Court.
44. Married persons must live together, or be imprisoned.
45. Every male shall have his hair cut round according to a cap.
