= 2024 in Washington (state) =

- Decades: 2000s; 2010s; 2020s
- See also: History of Washington (state); Historical outline of Washington (state); List of years in Washington (state); 2024 in the United States

The following is a list of events of the year 2024 in the U.S. state of Washington.

== Incumbents ==
=== State government ===
- Governor: Jay Inslee (D)

== Events ==
- January 1: Highest minimum wage laws in the country go into effect at both state and local levels
  - Washington State minimum wage rises to $16.28 per hour and remains the highest state minimum wage in the United States throughout the year.
  - Seattle minimum wage rises to $19.97 per hour, the highest for a major U.S. city.
- March 12: primaries
  - 2024 Washington Democratic presidential primary
  - 2024 Washington Republican presidential primary
- March 13: Washington octopus protection law becomes world's first ban on octopus aquaculture.
- March 19: Seattle independent music station KEXP expands to the Bay Area with near-simulcast on KEXC transmitter. The KEXP license owner had bought the new station at auction in late 2023.
- April 8: A partial solar eclipse was visible everywhere in the state, varying from 20% totality in Seattle to almost 30% in Pullman.
- April 27: 2 Line (Sound Transit) partially opens with Eastside light rail service.
- April 29: 2024 University of Washington pro-Palestinian campus occupation begins.

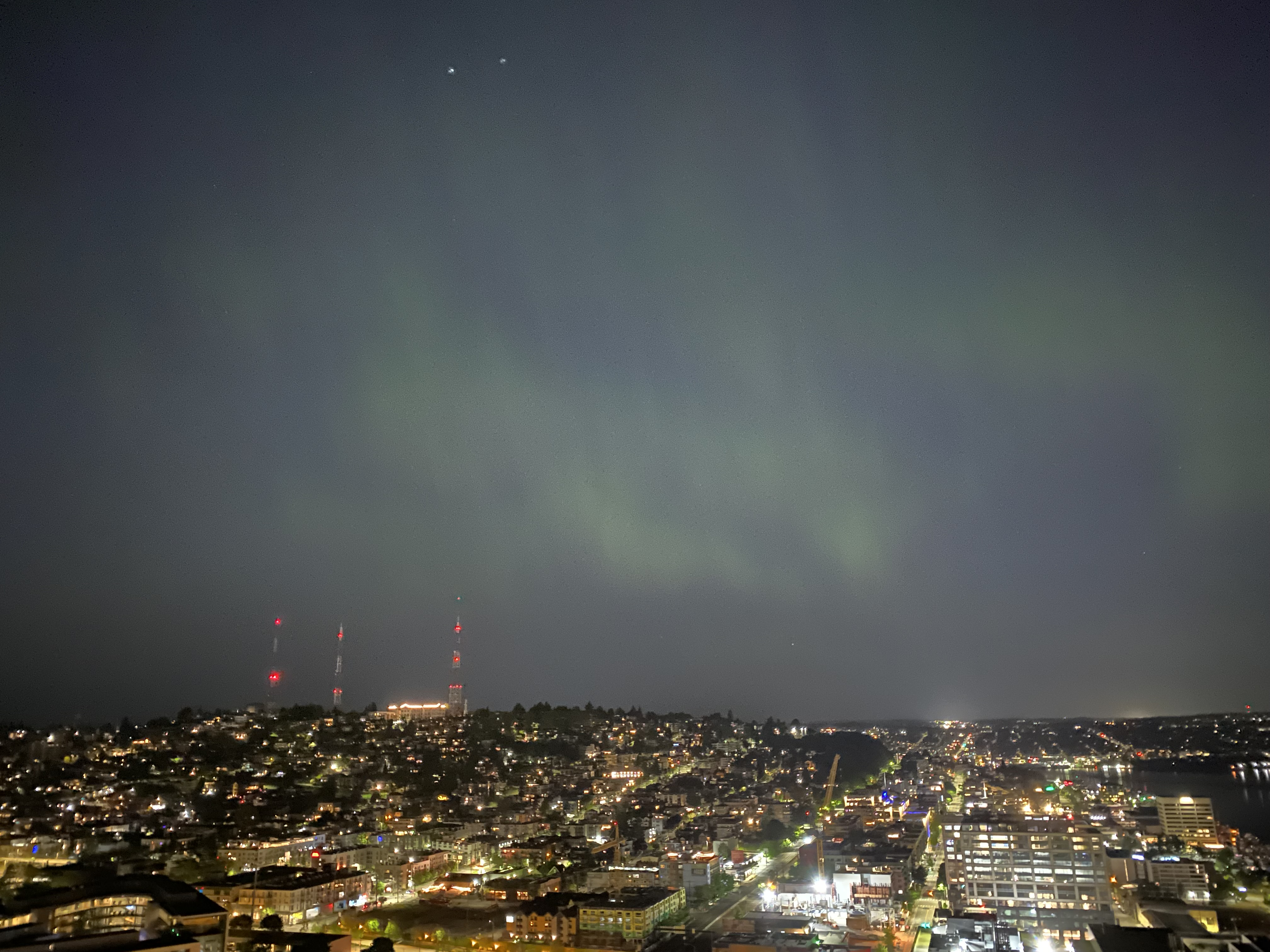
Aurora borealis seen over Lake Union and Queen Anne Hill, Seattle, during May 2024 solar storms in the early morning of May 11

- May 10–11: A level 5 geomagnetic storm during the May 2024 solar storms, "the strongest geomagnetic storm in over two decades" according to NASA, produces aurora borealis visible as far south as Florida and across Washington state, even in highly light polluted cities like Seattle.
- May 28: The Seattle Public Library's checkout and online services were shut down by a ransomware attack.
- June 8: Pioneer Fire, the first large fire of the 2024 Washington wildfire season, begins.
  - July 28: Town of Stehekin ordered to evacuate (by boat) due to Pioneer Fire.
- August 1: Washington's first state-funded electric vehicle rebate program begins, with $45 million earmarked for low-income households buying or leasing. It was called the nation's first rebate program to incentivize EV leases for low-income drivers.
- July 23: Retreat Fire begins as the result of a propane tank explosion. The fire would later cause evacuations and the closure of U.S. Route 12 over White Pass for over three weeks.
- August 24, 2024: In the 2024 CrowdStrike-related IT outages, digital infrastructure at Seattle-Tacoma International Airport, including its website, phone lines, check-in system, and automated baggage sorting, was disabled by a cyberattack.
- August 27: A Seattle University engineering professor and mountaineer publishes his findings that Columbia Crest is no longer the summit of Mount Rainier, due to glacial shrinking, and the mountain's GPS-measured height is 14,399.6 feet.
- August 30: Lynnwood Link extension opens, extending Seattle area light rail north into Snohomish County.
- September 13: More than 33,000 machinists go on strike against Boeing, many of whom work at Seattle, Renton, and Everett plants.
- October 10: A large geomagnetic storm produced northern lights in Seattle, and elsewhere in the United States as far south as Washington D.C.
- October 21: Five members of a family, including three teenagers, are killed in a mass shooting in Fall City.
- November 4: Boeing machinists vote to end their 53-day strike.
- November 5: state and federal elections are held during the 2024 Washington elections.
  - Federal
    - 2024 United States presidential election in Washington (state)
    - 2024 United States Senate election in Washington
    - 2024 United States House of Representatives elections in Washington
  - State
    - 2024 Washington gubernatorial election
    - 2024 Washington Attorney General election
    - Ballot measures
      - 2024 Washington Initiative 2109 – Proposed repeal of state capital gains tax
      - 2024 Washington Initiative 2117 – Proposed repeal of state carbon tax cap and trade laws
      - 2024 Washington Initiative 2124 – Proposal to make employee participation in state long-term care program voluntary
- November 19–20: The November 2024 Northeast Pacific bomb cyclone resulted in over 600,000 people in the Seattle area without electricity, and killed two Washington individuals.

== Sports ==
National events

- January 1: 2024 NHL Winter Classic
- PSA World Tour Finals
  - June 18: 2024 Men's PSA World Tour Finals
  - June 18: 2024 Women's PSA World Tour Finals began
- June 20: 2024 Women's PGA Championship began
- July 28–August 3: Junior League World Series (softball) in Kirkland
- August 10: 2024 NAPA Auto Care 150 in West Richland; inaugural event of new annual race
- October 12: WrestleDream (2024)

Local teams

- August: University of Washington Huskies football team leaves Pac-12 Conference
  - September: First non-conference Apple Cup (Note: since foundation of conference's predecessor, Athletic Association of Western Universities, in 1959 (the cup's foundation in 1900 predates the conference)) (UW Huskies vs WSU Cougars)

== See also ==
- 2024 in the United States
