= 2020 in Washington (state) =

- Decades: 2000s; 2010s; 2020s
- See also: History of Washington (state); Historical outline of Washington (state); List of years in Washington (state); 2020 in the United States

The following is a list of events of the year 2020 in the U.S. state of Washington.

== Incumbents ==
=== State government ===
- Governor: Jay Inslee (D)

== Events ==
- January 21: First known U.S. case of COVID-19 reported in Snohomish County by Centers for Disease Control
- February 26: First known U.S. death from COVID-19 occurs in Kirkland, part of an outbreak at a nursing home.
- February 29: COVID-19 pandemic in Washington (state) officially begins when the first cases of COVID-19 in the United States are reported, and a state of emergency is declared by Governor Inslee
- March–October: 2020 Washington wildfires
- March 6: CNBC reports that an Amazon group in Seattle known as "Grand Challenge" and "1492" is undertaking Project Gesundheit to cure the common cold.
- March 23: Statewide COVID-19 lockdowns ordered by the governor
- c. April 29: Scattered Canary begins defrauding the state unemployment department, eventually taking hundreds of millions of dollars illegally
- May – August: George Floyd protests in Washington (state)
- June 8: Capitol Hill Occupied Protest (also called CHOP or CHAZ) established
- June 1 – August 7: End of Watch Ride to Remember motorcycle rally begins and ends in Spokane
- November 3: 2020 Washington elections

Sports

- February 8–15: 2020 United States Men's Curling Championship and Women's Curling Championship, Spokane

== See also ==
- 2020 in the United States
