= 2022 in Washington (state) =

- Decades: 2000s; 2010s; 2020s
- See also: History of Washington (state); Historical outline of Washington (state); List of years in Washington (state); 2022 in the United States

The following is a list of events of the year 2022 in the U.S. state of Washington.

Washington set several weather records in 2022. Seattle experienced its driest summer on record. In September and October, air quality was low in parts of the state due to smoke from wildfires in Washington and Oregon, and was the worst in the world on September 10. Later, due to a winter storm, the state experienced record-setting water levels in December, with four locations setting new all-time highs.

In 2022, Washington saw a spike in violent crime and set a state record with 394 murders within the year. However, when adjusted to be proportionate to the population of the state, the murder rate was lower in 2022 than it was in 1994.

== Incumbents ==
=== State government ===
- Governor: Jay Inslee (D)

== Deaths ==
- August 12 – Dorli Rainey, Seattle-area political activist

== Events ==
=== January – June ===
- January 1 – The state's minimum wage rises to $14.49 per hour.
- March 27 – Seattle's Dacha Diner closes.

=== July – August ===
- July 22 – Bellator 283: Lima vs. Jackson is held in Tacoma.

=== September ===
- September 4 – A passenger flight crashes into Mutiny Bay, killing all 10 people on board.
- September 5 – The Washington State Fair begins in Puyallup.
- September 10 – The air quality in parts of Washington is listed as the worst in the world due to wildfire smoke.
- September 21 – The state ceases regular reporting of COVID-19 infection data.
- September 25 – The Washington State Fair ends.
- September 26 – Amtrak relaunches service between Seattle and Vancouver B.C., about two years after it shut down service due to the COVID-19 pandemic.

=== October – December ===
- October 9 – The Nakia Creek Fire begins.
- October 29 – A federal judge finds that the City of Everett's dress code is unconstitutional, ruling that baristas have the right to wear bikinis in the state.
- October 31 – Governor Jay Inslee declares an end to the state's COVID-19 public health emergency.
- November 29 – ʔálʔal Café opens at Pioneer Square, Seattle.
- December 25 – An estimated 14,000 people in Southwest Washington lose power due to vandalism at three substations in the area.

== See also ==
- 2022 in Canada
- 2022 in the United States
  - 2022 in California
  - 2022 in Idaho
  - 2022 in Oregon
