= 2026 in Washington (state) =

- Decades: 2000s; 2010s; 2020s
- See also: History of Washington (state); Historical outline of Washington (state); List of years in Washington (state); 2026 in the United States

The following is a list of events of the year 2026 in the U.S. state of Washington.

== Incumbents ==
=== State government ===
- Governor:
  - Bob Ferguson

== Events ==
=== January ===
- January 1
  - State minimum wage increases to $17.13 per hour, highest state rate in the nation, though lower than the District of Columbia. Some places in Washington have even higher minimum wages: Bellingham, Burien, Everett, King County, Renton, SeaTac, Seattle and Tukwila.
  - State nicotine excise tax increases to 95%.
- January 5
  - Organizers of the Skagit Valley Tulip Festival announce that the 2026 festival will not be negatively affected by record flooding on the Skagit River in 2025, which was earlier feared to have harmed bulbs. Hundreds of thousands of visitors to Skagit Valley usually attend the festival.
  - The Washington Attorney General says he is aware of "allegations of [daycare] fraud" in Washington, Ohio, and Minnesota, and says it is a local or federal matter, not under his office's jurisdiction, and cautions against "random vigilante people" visiting providers.
- January 9 – Two snowmobilers are killed in an avalanche in northern Kittitas County.
- January 13 – Governor Bob Ferguson delivers his first State of the State speech to the entire Washington State Legislature.
- January 17 – Multiple shootings in the Chinatown-International District in Seattle kill one person and hospitalize four others.
- January 28 – Amazon announces layoffs for about 2,200 employees in the Seattle area.

=== February ===
- February 8 – The Seattle Seahawks win Super Bowl LX, beating the New England Patriots 29–13.
- February 10 – Special elections are held.
- February 11 – The Seahawks victory parade is held in Seattle.
- February 17 – Governor Ferguson requests $137 million from the federal government to fix infrastructure that was damaged by flooding in December 2025.
- February 24 – A man stabs four people to death outside a home on the Key Peninsula near Gig Harbor before being shot and killed by a sheriff's deputy.

=== March ===
- March 10 – Seattle passes an emergency resolution to ban new ICE immigration detention centers for one year.
- March 12 – One person is killed in Snohomish County and 35,000 households in Western Washington are without power due to a wind and rain storm.
- March 28 – The Sound Transit's 2 Line light rail connection between Eastside and Seattle over Lake Washington, known as the Crosslake Connection, opens for passenger service.
- March 30 – Governor Ferguson signs the millionaires tax into law. If it survives legal challenge, it will become the state's first income tax.

=== April ===
- April 1–30 – Skagit Valley Tulip Festival
- April 8 – A statewide drought is declared due to unusually low snowpack.
- April 15 – A rare waterspout associated with the Puget Sound Convergence Zone is spotted in Puget Sound, a few miles west of Magnolia, Seattle.
- April 28 – Special election
- April 30 – Six people, including the suspect, are stabbed and injured at Foss High School in Tacoma. Four of the victims and the suspect are students, while the fifth victim is a security guard.

=== May ===
- May 7
  - The first fire of the 2026 Washington wildfires, the Libby Creek Fire, breaks out in the Okanogan–Wenatchee National Forest.
  - The 2026 Canvas data breach affects schools and universities in the state, including University of Washington and Washington State University during finals week.
- May 7–17 – Seattle International Film Festival
- May 10 – A University of Washington student is stabbed to death in a laundry room at her off-campus apartment. A suspect is arrested three days later.
- May 25 – A cyberattack results in the complete shutdown of Chelan County government computer and telephone network. The shutdown does not affect emergency services.
- May 26
  - A chemical tank implodes at a pulp and paper mill in Longview. 11 people are killed.
  - Meta files paperwork for the layoff of 1,395 employees in the state of Washington, including 699 in Bellevue.

=== June ===
- c. June 11 – State officials announce they will not be sending a delegation to the Great American State Fair for the U.S. Semiquincentennial in the District of Columbia, with Lieutenant Washington State Governor Denny Heck citing cost concerns.
- June 13 – A Marine Corps F/A-18 crashes near Rimrock Lake
- June 16 – Helion Energy, based in Everett, receives licenses from state regulators to build a fusion power plant in Malaga. It says is the first time a fusion power facility receives full licensing anywhere.

=== July ===
- July 14 – A Seattle woman films a video of a wild raccoon with a spinal deformity. The raccoon, dubbed "Jimothy", goes viral online.
- July 15 – Federal judges appoint Roger Rogoff to be the new U.S. Attorney for the Western District of Washington. Less than an hour later, Trump fires Rogoff.
- July 24 – The Kaiser Canyon Fire in Eastern Washington grows to over 100,000 acres (400 km^{2}). Town of Nespelem evacuated July 25.
- July 26 – 2026 Seattle Center shooting: A mass shooting occurs at the Seattle Center during the Bite of Seattle food festival. Three people, including one of the shooters, are killed, and four people are injured. Police say the shooting is gang-related.
- July 30 – Seattle Police Department chief Shon Barnes resigns amid criticism over his department's handling of the July 26 shooting at the Bite of Seattle event.

=== August ===
- August 1 – Governor Bob Ferguson declares a statewide fire emergency.
- August 1–2 – The Old Trails Fire in and around Spokane destroys 640 structures. On August 3, a man is arrested and charged with arson for setting the fire.
- August 13 – A King County judge orders prediction market Kalshi to cease operations in the state, ruling that it is an illegal gambling operation and violates the Washington Gambling Act and the Consumer Protection Act.
- August 28 – Little Giant Fire becomes the national top priority wildfire.

=== September ===
- September 16 – Software company Oracle announces it will lay off 359 workers across the state in November, impacting employees out of two facilities in Seattle, as well as those who work remotely.
- September 22 – Microsoft announces c. 300 jobs cut in the Puget Sound area in AI, cloud computing, and Xbox. Total planned cuts at Xbox amounted to 3,200 jobs by the end of 2026.
- September 23
  - PeaceHealth, a Catholic healthcare system operating in Alaska, Oregon, and Washington, announces it is cutting 150 jobs statewide across Washington, mostly in Vancouver.
  - Travel company Expedia announces it is cutting 58 jobs at its headquarters campus in Seattle.
- September 28 – Governor Ferguson creates Washington Space Council via executive order, with industry, academic and government members.

=== October ===
- October 26 – Microsoft makes a "voluntary exit offer" to 60,000 employees to reduce headcount. Not all of the offers were to employees in Washington.

=== November ===
- November 1
  - Seattle and Vancouver, B.C. clocks become an hour off from each other, with unequal observation of Pacific Time Zone daylight saving time in British Columbia and Washington.
  - A resident of Yakima County dies from H5N1 avian influenza following contact with an infected dairy herd. This is the first death from avian influenza in the U.S. in 2026.
- November 3 – U.S. midterm elections and state elections
  - 2026 United States House of Representatives elections in Washington
  - 2026 Washington House of Representatives election
  - 2026 Washington State Senate election
  - 2026 Washington Supreme Court election

== Sports ==
=== Events ===
- June 15 – First Seattle World Cup event, 2026 FIFA World Cup Group G Belgium vs Egypt
- June 19 – World Cup, United States vs. Australia in Seattle
- June 24 – 2026 FIFA World Cup Group B Playoff Winner A vs. Qatar, Seattle

=== Professional ===
- 2025–26 Seattle Kraken season
- 2026 Seattle Mariners season
- 2026 Seattle Sounders FC season
- 2026 Seattle Storm season

=== College ===
- September 5 – Apple Cup in Seattle
- 2025–26 Eastern Washington Eagles men's basketball team
- 2025–26 Gonzaga Bulldogs men's basketball team
- 2025–26 Seattle Kraken season
- 2025–26 Seattle Redhawks men's basketball team
- 2025–26 Washington Huskies men's basketball team
- 2025–26 Washington Huskies women's basketball team
- 2025–26 Washington State Cougars men's basketball team

== See also ==
- 2026 in the United States
