= Useless Bay =

Useless Bay may refer to:

- Useless Bay (Georgia), a swamp in Georgia
- Useless Bay (Washington), a bay in Washington
- Inútil Bay, or "Useless Bay", a bay of Chile
