= 2025 in Washington (state) =

- Decades: 2000s; 2010s; 2020s
- See also: History of Washington (state); Historical outline of Washington (state); List of years in Washington (state); 2025 in the United States

The following is a list of events of the year 2025 in the U.S. state of Washington.

== Incumbents ==
=== State government ===
- Governor:
  - Jay Inslee (until January 15)
  - Bob Ferguson (beginning January 15)

== Events ==
=== January ===
- January 1 – Minimum wage increases to $16.66 per hour per an adjustment based on the federal Consumer Price Index.
- January 2 – Amazon requires employees to be present in South Lake Union headquarters buildings 5 days a week.
- January 9–11 – Washington firefighters from 43 agencies trek by road to California to support suppression of the 2025 California wildfires
- January 13 – The Washington State Legislature convenes at the Washington State Capitol, Olympia, and is "the first time that both of a state legislature's chambers have been led by LGBTQ+ people": Laurie Jinkins, Speaker of the House, and Jamie Pedersen, Senate majority leader.
- January 15 – Bob Ferguson takes office as the 24th Governor of Washington
- January 18 – People's March in Seattle

=== February ===
- February 24–25 – The second-highest wind gust ever recorded at Seattle-Tacoma International Airport, 52 miles per hour (84 km/h), is observed during a storm, and a 60-mile-per-hour (97 km/h) gust at Boeing Field in Seattle. It was related to a sting jet weather phenomenon, according to some meteorologists.

=== March ===
- Late March – Jeff Bezos sells a house in Hunts Point for $63 million, a record price for a private residence in Washington.

=== April ===
- by April 1 – Washington State Attorney General files or participates in at least eight federal lawsuits concerning Second Trump administration policies and actions, including DOGE, birthright citizenship, and federal funding for health care and research.

=== May ===
- May 1 – May Day protests in Seattle and other King County localities including the Eastside; Tacoma; Yakima; Bellingham; Lynnwood and elsewhere in Snohomish County; Olympia; and cities on the Kitsap Peninsula
- May 5 – Protesters take over a building at the University of Washington, demanding the school sever ties with Boeing. At least 25 people are arrested.
- May 7 – Washington driver's licenses may no longer be used as proof of identity for commercial air travel, under the REAL ID Act.
- May 10 – The 2 Line of Sound Transit's Link light rail system extended east into Downtown Redmond
- May 14 – Valley Medical Center announces that it will close five clinics and two inpatient units at its hospital as part of the state government's budget cuts and the loss of federal Medicaid reimbursement.
- May 30:
  - A semi-truck containing 14 million honeybees overturns in Whatcom County, releasing most of the bees.
  - Decker children killings: Sisters Paityn, Evelyn and Olivia Decker (ages 9, 8 and 5 respectively) are reported missing from Wenatchee after their father Travis Decker does not return them from a custodial visit. They are found dead three days later, and Travis Decker is charged with murder. He is found dead in September.

=== June ===
- June 8–present – 2025 Washington wildfire season starts with Cle Elum blaze destroying two homes.
- June 14 – No Kings protests in many cities
- June 29 – The T-Rex World Championship Races are held at the Emerald Downs racetrack in Auburn.

=== July ===
- July 18 – a fuel tanker truck crash near Port Angeles spills approximately approximately 2,798 US gallons (10,590 L) of gasoline and 172 US gallons (650 L) of diesel fuel into Indian Creek, killing more than 2,000 fish.
- July 31 - $1 million of whiskey was stolen from Westland Distillery warehouse in Burlington

=== August ===
- August 13–17 – 83rd World Science Fiction Convention in Seattle
- August 26 – Redmond police remove and arrest protesters from Microsoft president Brad Smith's office in building 34 of the corporate campus.
- August 27 – Border Patrol agents arrest two firefighters helping fight the Bear Gulch Fire on the Olympic Peninsula.
- August 30: Revive in 25 Christian rally, Gas Works Park, Seattle, and kazoo band counter-protest

=== September ===
- September 3
  - A federal judge ends the Seattle Police Department's consent decree with the Department of Justice, which had been in place since 2012.
  - Washington, Oregon, and California announce the formation of the West Coast Health Alliance to take over some of the CDC's former functions.
- September 5–7 – 2025 Washington wildfires, including fourteen fires burning in both Western Washington and Eastern Washington, four of them larger than 10,000 acres. Air quality was unhealthy in Colville, and a "smokestorm" on September 5 caused "extraordinarily unhealthy" conditions north and east of Seattle, with the highest value of particulates ever recorded in Lake Forest Park.
- September 8 – first "live wire" test of 2 Line (Sound Transit) light rail across Lake Washington
- September 17 – Four Army soldiers from Joint Base Lewis-McChord are killed when their MH-60 Black Hawk helicopter crashes near Summit Lake.
- September 18 – Officials find Travis Decker's remains south of Leavenworth, following a manhunt.

=== October ===
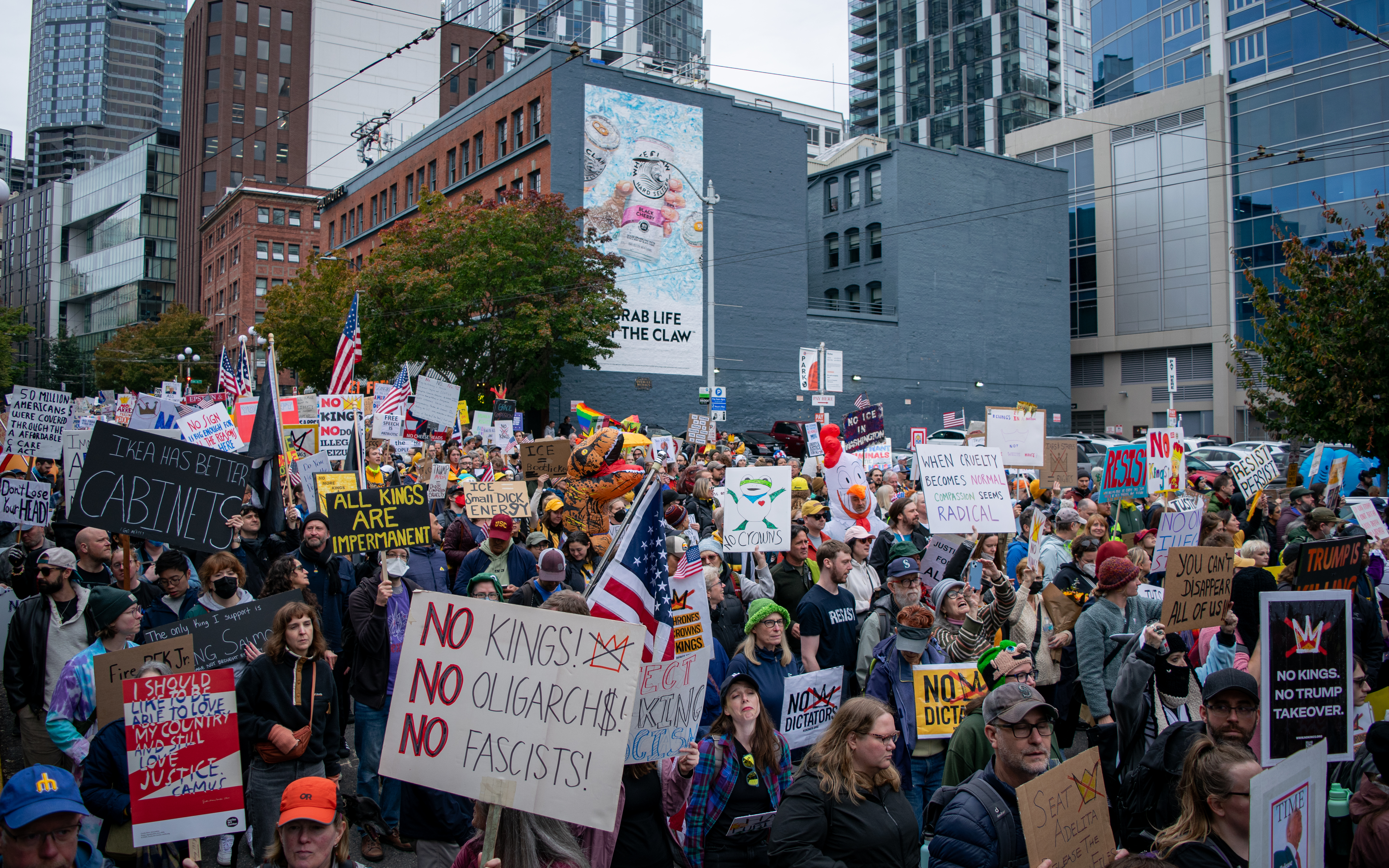
No Kings protest in Seattle, October 18, 2025

- October 1 – The United States federal government shutdown results in closures of National Forest sites across the state, as well as Mount St. Helens National Volcanic Monument.
- October 18 – No Kings protests occur in several cities.
- October 27 – The 2025 wildfire season ends, with heavy rains across the state.

=== November ===
- November 4: elections
  - 2025 King County, Washington Executive election
  - 2025 Seattle mayoral election
- November 11–25 – Jet fuel delivery via Olympic Pipeline to Seattle–Tacoma International Airport is curtailed due to a leak discovered near Everett. The pipeline is partially restored on November 25.

=== December ===
- December 6 – The 1 Line of Sound Transit's Link light rail system is extended 8 miles (13 km) south to Federal Way with three new stations.
- December 8 – 2025 Pacific Northwest floods begin when an atmospheric river reaches the state.
- December 9 – The King County Executive declares emergency due to expected flooding.
- December 10 – Governor Ferguson declares a statewide emergency due to flooding. Interstate 90 eastbound and U.S. 2 in both directions were closed due to mudslides across the highways.
- December 12 – U.S. President certifies a federal emergency for the floods. Federal Emergency Management Agency aid is authorized for many Washington state and tribal entities; state subdivisions include 13 of 19 Western Washington counties (Clallam, Grays Harbor, Jefferson, King, Kittitas, Lewis, Mason, Pierce, Skagit, Snohomish, Thurston, Wahkiakum, and Whatcom) and three Eastern Washington counties (Benton, Chelan, and Yakima).
- December 23 – 2025 radioactive shrimp recall: Bellevue based Direct Source Seafood issues a product recall.
- c. December 30 – Daycare facilities in Kent and elsewhere are subject of investigative journalism following the 2020s Minnesota fraud scandals.

== Sports ==
Events

- 2025 FIFA Club World Cup: Six matches are held at Lumen Field in Seattle, including three home matches for Seattle Sounders FC.
- August 31 – Seattle Sounders FC win the 2025 Leagues Cup, defeating Inter Miami CF in the final at Lumen Field. A stadium-record crowd of 69,314 spectators attended the match.
- December 15 – The Washington Huskies win the 2025 NCAA Division I men's soccer championship game, beating the NC State Wolfpack 2–1.

Professional

- September 25 – Seattle Mariners win American League West championship
- 2024–25 Seattle Kraken season
- 2025 Seattle Mariners season
- 2025 Seattle Sounders FC season
- 2025 Seattle Storm season

College

- 2024–25 Eastern Washington Eagles men's basketball team
- 2024–25 Gonzaga Bulldogs women's basketball team
- 2024–25 Gonzaga Bulldogs men's basketball team
- 2024–25 Seattle Redhawks men's basketball team
- 2024–25 Washington Huskies men's basketball team
- 2024–25 Washington Huskies women's basketball team
- 2024–25 Washington State Cougars men's basketball team
- September 20: Apple Cup in Pullman
