= 2023 in Washington (state) =

- Decades: 2000s; 2010s; 2020s
- See also: History of Washington (state); Historical outline of Washington (state); List of years in Washington (state); 2023 in the United States

The following is a list of events of the year 2023 in the U.S. state of Washington.

== Incumbents ==
=== State government ===
- Governor: Jay Inslee (D)

== Events ==
- January 21: Seattle Chinese Post published its last issue, and Northwest Asian Weekly became online-only.
- January 23: Killing of Jaahnavi Kandula
- March–December: 2023 Washington wildfires
- May 14: 2023 South Coldwater Slide destroyed a bridge and cut off access to Mount St. Helens National Volcanic Monument
- May 24: WA 64 apple introduced by Washington State University Tree Fruit Research and Extension Center
- June 13: Killing of Eina Kwon
- August 4–19: Over 60,000 people visited the LDS Moses Lake Temple prior to its September dedication.
- September 16: Link light rail extended to Hilltop, Tacoma, Washington with opening of the St. Joseph station
- November 7 elections:
  - 2023 Seattle City Council election: A slate of candidates endorsed by The Seattle Times faced a slate endorsed by The Stranger in "the first major council shake-up since the 2020 protests", referencing the George Floyd protests in Seattle, Capitol Hill Occupied Protest, and 2020–21 United States election protests.
  - 2023 Spokane mayoral election: Lisa Brown was elected.
- December 5: 2023 Pacific Northwest floods begin with an atmospheric river that set rainfall and temperature records.

== Sports ==
National events

- July 9–11: 2023 Major League Baseball draft
- July 11: 2023 Major League Baseball All-Star Game
- October 1: WrestleDream (2023) inaugural event
- November 17: 2023 NAIA cross country championships

Professional teams

- 2022–23 Seattle Kraken season
- 2023–24 Seattle Kraken season
- 2023 Seattle Mariners season
- 2023 OL Reign season
- 2023 Seattle Sea Dragons season
- 2023 Seattle Seahawks season
- 2023 Seattle Sounders FC season
- 2023 Seattle Storm season

College teams

- Eastern Eagles
  - 2023 Eastern Washington Eagles football team
  - 2022–23 Eastern Washington Eagles men's basketball team
  - 2023–24 Eastern Washington Eagles men's basketball team
  - 2023–24 Eastern Washington Eagles women's basketball team
- Gonzaga Bulldogs
  - 2022–23 Gonzaga Bulldogs women's basketball team
  - 2023–24 Gonzaga Bulldogs women's basketball team
  - 2022–23 Gonzaga Bulldogs men's basketball team
  - 2023–24 Gonzaga Bulldogs men's basketball team
- Seattle University Redhawks
  - 2022–23 Seattle Redhawks men's basketball team
  - 2023–24 Seattle Redhawks men's basketball team
  - 2023–24 Seattle Redhawks women's basketball team
- UW Huskies
  - 2023 Washington Huskies baseball team
  - 2022–23 Washington Huskies men's basketball team
  - 2023–24 Washington Huskies men's basketball team
  - 2022–23 Washington Huskies women's basketball team
  - 2023–24 Washington Huskies women's basketball team
  - 2023 Washington Huskies football team
- WSU Cougars
  - 2022–23 Washington State Cougars men's basketball team
  - 2023–24 Washington State Cougars men's basketball team
  - 2023 Washington State Cougars football team
  - 2022–23 Washington State Cougars women's basketball team
  - 2023–24 Washington State Cougars women's basketball team

== See also ==
- 2023 in the United States
