= 2025 in Washington =

2025 in Washington may refer to one of two places in the United States:

- 2025 in Washington (state)
- 2025 in Washington, D.C.
