= Washington octopus protection law =

2024 Washington legislation

House Bill 1153, the Washington octopus protection law is legislation passed in 2024 to prohibit octopus aquaculture in the U.S. state of Washington. The bill was introduced by Representative Strom Peterson. It passed the legislature on February 27. It is the first ban on octopus farming in the world. It received the governor's signature on March 13, 2024, and became law effective June 6.
