= 2024 University of Washington pro-Palestinian campus occupation =

Demonstration in Seattle, Washington, U.S.

- Part of Gaza war protests (in the US • at universities (in 2024 (in the US)))
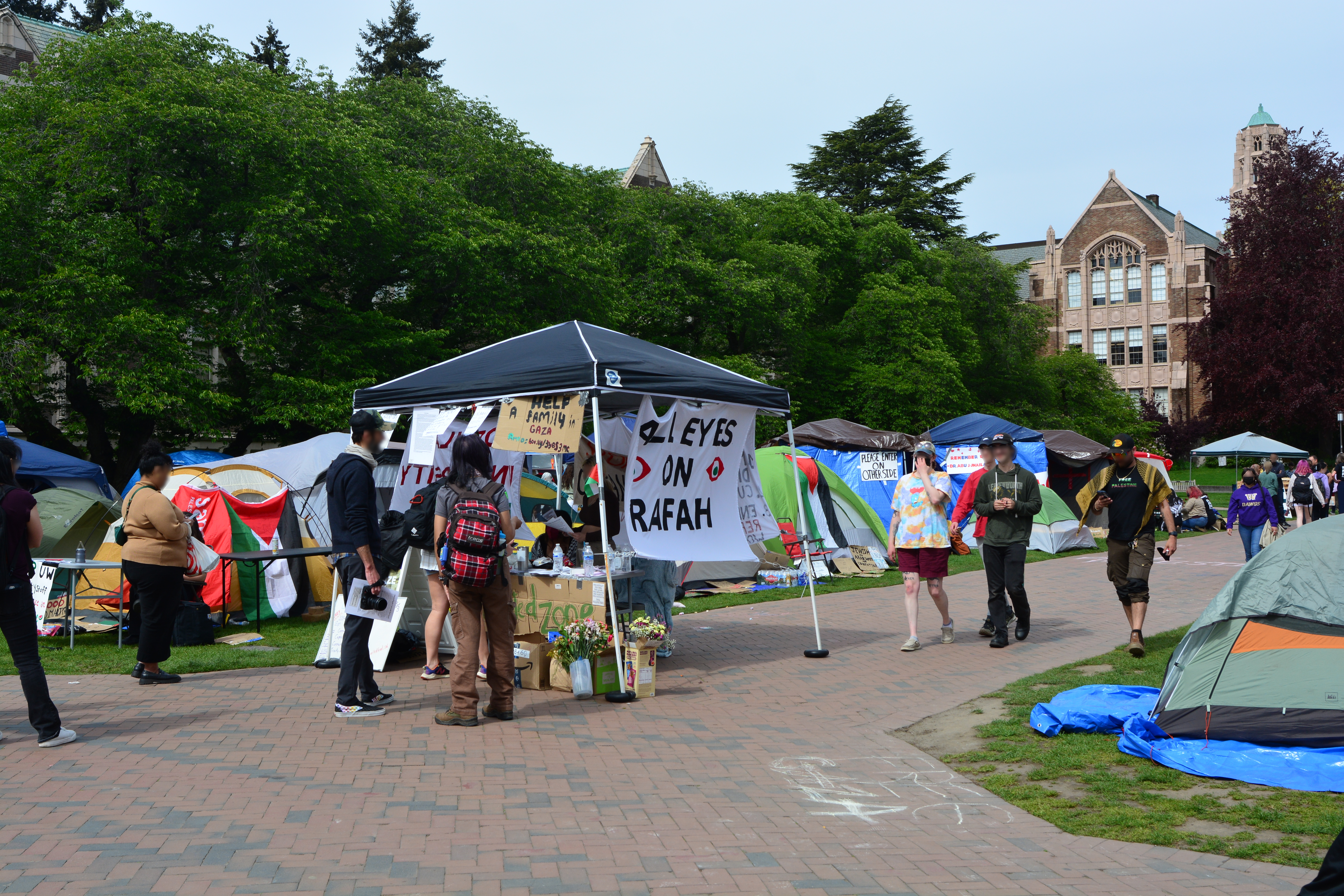
- Date: Spring 2024
- Location: University of Washington; Seattle, Washington, U.S.
- Caused by: Gaza war
- Goals: Divestment from Boeing
- Result: Protest disbanded after UW agreed to open a Center for Scholarship of Palestine, convene a military industrial and labor task force, and representation on a divestment committee

In 2024, an occupation protest was started by students on the University of Washington campus, in Seattle, Washington.

== Background ==
Protests, including rallies, demonstrations, and vigils related to the Gaza war have occurred across the U.S. since the conflict's start on October 7, 2023, alongside other Gaza war protests around the world. Protests on the campus of the UW began on October 10, 2023, with a candlelight vigil held by Students Supporting Israel and attended by Jewish community leaders, mourning the deaths of Jews killed in the October 7 attack, including UW graduate Hayim Katsman, who was murdered in the Holit massacre. Two days later, Students United for Palestinian Equality & Return held a day of resistance and protest for Palestine, filling Red Square with protesters and counter-protesters.

Protests continued through the fall into 2024. In late-April 2024, the protests escalated, following similar protest movements across the country, with protesters demanding the University of Washington divest from Boeing, a major regional employer that protesters say has aided and profited from the Israeli occupation of Gaza.

== Timeline ==
The protest began April 29 with a couple dozen protesters occupying the University of Washington Quad. The protest had been planned for the previous week but was delayed after criticisms emerged that the group had not originally included Palestinians, Muslims, and Arabs in planning.

By May 3, the occupation of the Quad had grown to over 100 protesters.

On May 7, Turning Point USA founder and right-wing activist Charlie Kirk visited campus. Protesters barricaded entrances and argued with Kirk's supporters.

The protest disbanded on May 20 after university administration agreed to open a Center for Scholarship of Palestine, convene a military industrial and labor task force, and representation on a divestment committee.

== Aftermath ==
On October 7, 2024, a year after the start of the war, 130 people gathered at the Sylvan Grove Theater and Columns to honor the Palestinian lives lost in the war and also to mourn the death of Ayşenur Ezgi Eygi, a UW alumna who was shot and killed by Israel Defense Forces while protesting in the West Bank.

Following another protest on May 5, 2025, in which protesters again demanded the UW divest from Boeing, the Trump administration under Executive Order 14188 initiated a review of anti-Semitic activity on campus.

In March 2026, the King County Prosecuting Attorney’s Office filed criminal trespass charges against 33 individuals for occupying the Interdisciplinary Engineering Building of the University on May 5, 2025. In response, the university stated that it continues to support free speech together, public safety and respect for campus property, while also commending the filing of charges.

== See also ==
- 2024 pro-Palestinian protests on university campuses
  - List of pro-Palestinian protests on university campuses in 2024
    - List of pro-Palestinian protests on university campuses in the United States in 2024
- Gaza war protests in the United States
