= 2022 Mutiny Bay DHC-3 crash =

2022 floatplane crash

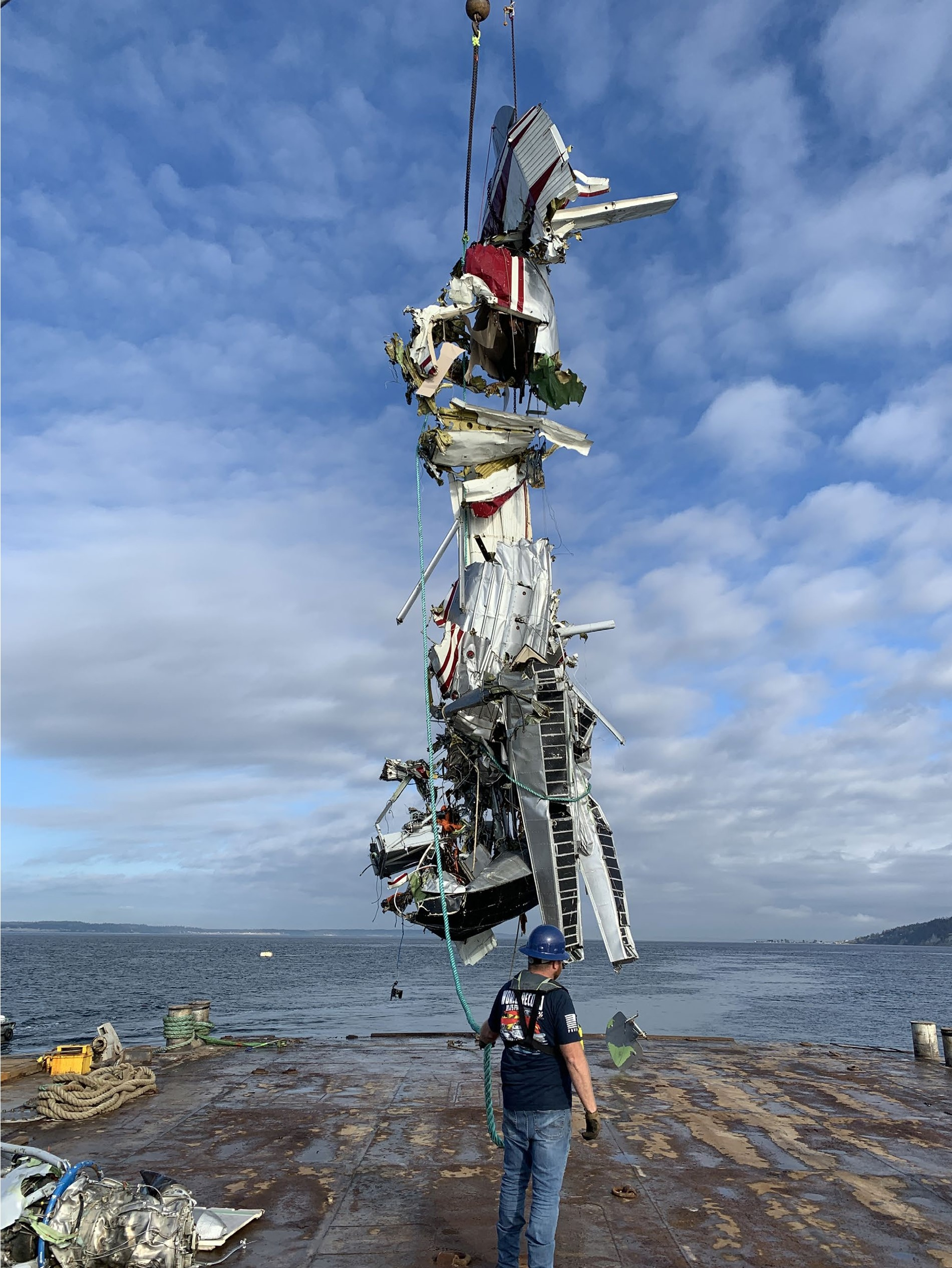
- The wreckage of the aircraft being lifted onto a barge

Accident
- Date: September 4, 2022
- Summary: Loss of pitch control due to Mechanical failure caused by maintenance error
- Site: Mutiny Bay, near Hansville, Washington, U.S.; 47.99032°N 122.58502°W

Aircraft
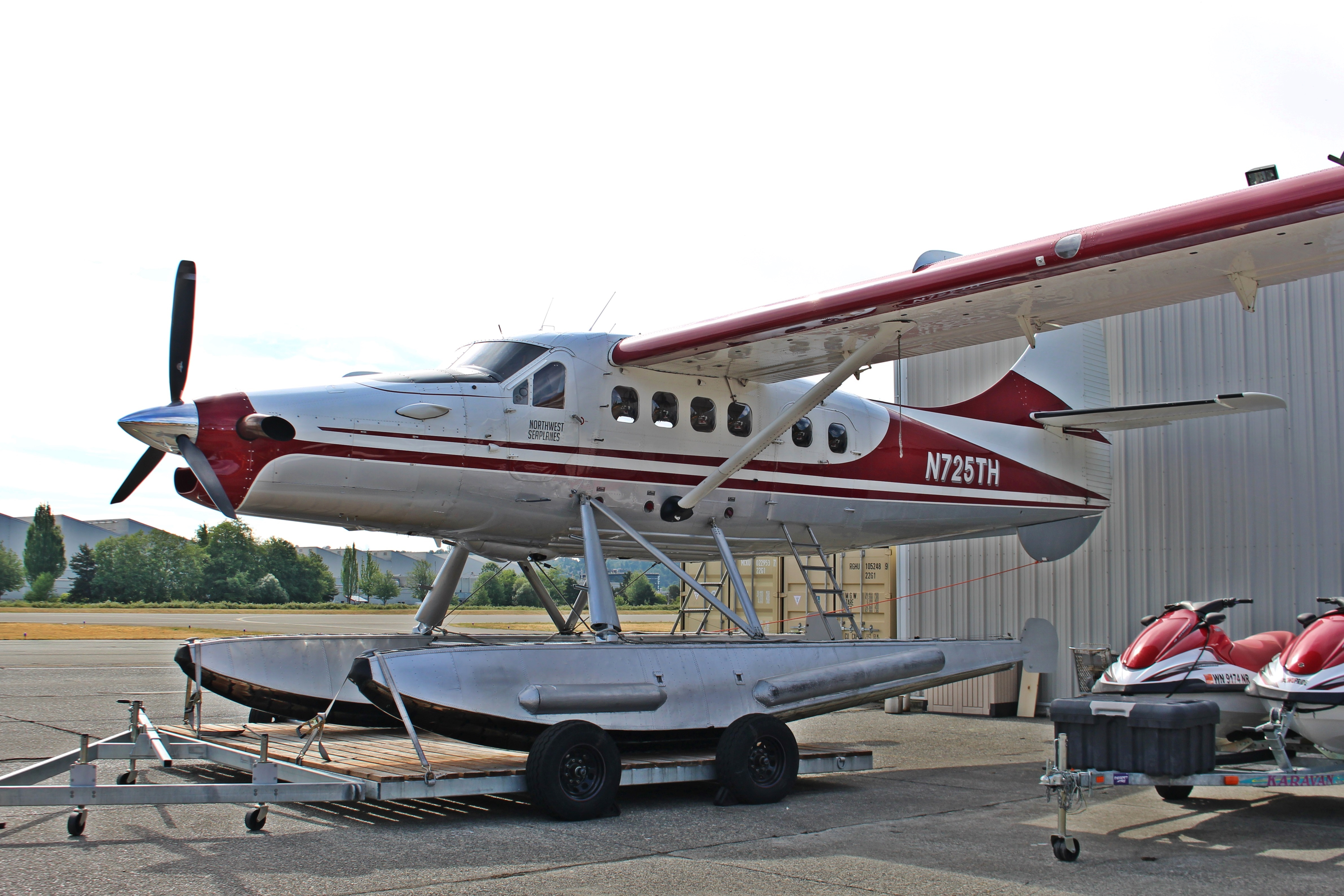
- N725TH, the DHC-3 Turbine Otter involved in the accident
- Aircraft type: DHC-3 Turbine Otter
- Operator: West Isle Air operated for Friday Harbor Seaplanes
- Registration: N725TH
- Flight origin: Friday Harbor Seaplane Base, Friday Harbor, Washington, U.S.
- Destination: Renton Municipal Airport, Renton, Washington, U.S.
- Passengers: 9
- Crew: 1
- Fatalities: 10
- Survivors: 0

On September 4, 2022, a DHC-3 Turbine Otter single-engine floatplane on a passenger flight from Friday Harbor to Renton, Washington, U.S., crashed into the waters of Mutiny Bay near Whidbey Island, killing all ten people on board. The plane was operated by West Isle Air doing business as Friday Harbor Seaplanes, a service owned by Northwest Seaplanes.

== Accident ==
The plane departed at 14:50 Pacific Daylight Time (21:50 UTC) from Friday Harbor and was en route to Renton Municipal Airport when reports of the crash came in at 15:11 PDT (22:11 UTC). Witnesses recalled a chaotic scene, with strong gasoline smells and said the impact "disintegrated" the airplane.

Before the plane crashed, Northwest Seaplanes noticed a slight shift in its direction compared to the flight plan and attempted to contact the pilot. Northwest Seaplanes called emergency responders after receiving no response, and soon after, witnesses called 911 to report that the plane had nosedived into the water at high speed.

== Aircraft ==
The 56-year-old de Havilland Canada DHC-3 Otter was manufactured in 1967 by Canadian aircraft company De Havilland Canada and issued serial number 466.

Prior to being registered in the United States, the aircraft was registered C-FVQD in Canada, having been acquired and operated by several Canadian airlines, charter operators, and private owners during the first 46 years of its lifespan.

The Canadian Civil Aircraft Register shows the aircraft's Canadian registration was cancelled on November 22, 2013, and the aircraft was subsequently exported to the United States on March 6, 2014.

Federal Aviation Administration (FAA) records show the aircraft was purchased in the United States by a private individual in early 2014, registered N725TH, and issued airworthiness in the United States on May 12, 2014. The aircraft was most recently registered to Northwest Seaplanes Inc., its registered owner at the time of the crash.

== Victims ==
All victims were American. The sole crew member was pilot Jason Winters, who had decades of experience. The dead include Washington civil rights activist Sandy Williams, founder and editor of Black Lens News, as well as actress Megan Hilty's pregnant sister, brother-in-law, and nephew.

== Investigation ==
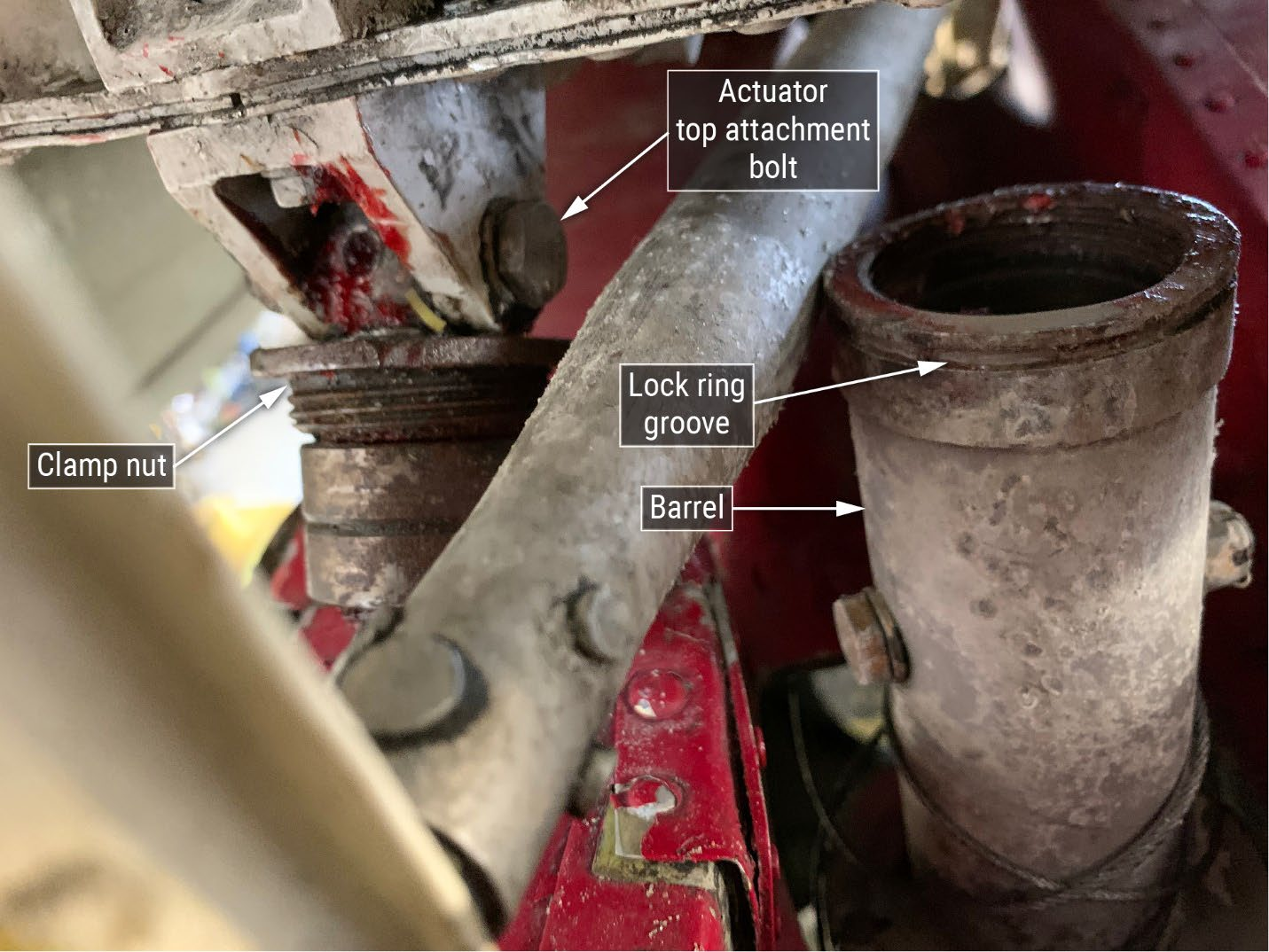
Horizontal stabilizer actuator clamp nut and upper end of barrel section as found in the wreckage

The National Transportation Safety Board (NTSB) opened an investigation into the crash and was joined by National Oceanic and Atmospheric Administration vessels in the search for wreckage. A side-scan sonar was deployed by the University of Washington Applied Physics Laboratory and discovered large debris 190 feet (58 m) below the surface that were identified as being similar to the plane. The NTSB worked with the US Navy to recover the wreckage using an ROV and a recovery barge.

The aircraft had no flight data recorder nor a cockpit voice recorder, and was not required to carry them. It was, however, equipped with a Ground Proximity Warning System. It had just passed a 100-hour inspection before the crash. Further recovery efforts took place on September 26, 2022; this search resulted in most of the wreckage and multiple bodies being recovered.

On October 24, 2022, the NTSB released an update on its investigation, stating that the horizontal stabilizer actuator had separated into two pieces at a threaded assembly fitting, which could be a contributing factor to the crash. The NTSB said that the actuator lock ring was missing from the wreckage. On October 25, 2022, Viking Air issued a service letter requiring DHC-3 Otter operators to inspect the aircraft and verify that the lock ring is properly installed.

The following day, on October 26, 2022, the NTSB issued urgent safety recommendations to the FAA and Transport Canada urging all DHC-3 Otter operators to inspect the horizontal stabilizer actuator lock ring and report their findings to the respective agencies. The NTSB also recommended the immediate grounding of all DHC-3 seaplanes until further notice, citing concern that more will crash.

=== Final report ===
On September 29, 2023, the NTSB released its final report on the crash, stating that the probable cause was the loss of control of the plane due to the unthreading of the clamp nut from the horizontal stabilizer trim actuator barrel due to a missing lock ring, which resulted in the horizontal stabilizer moving to an extreme trailing-edge-down position rendering the airplane’s pitch uncontrollable.
