= Craft malting =

Craft malting, also called micro-malting, is an agricultural practice of creating malting barley in relatively small quantities for craft beer. One guide says that craft malt must include 50% locally sourced grain, the figure endorsed by a trade industry group.

In addition to beer, craft malt can be used for whisky (peat malting), or as specialty grains for baking. The craft malt may be heirloom varieties that are not commercially viable for large growers; of tens of thousands of barley varieties, only 10 or so are produced in great quantity for beer. Craft malting also appeals to local food culture in areas away from the main grain producing areas of the Midwestern United States.

== History ==
Craft malting may be traced to a 2004 operation in Reno, Nevada that supplied organic products to Nevada and Northern California breweries. Other early craft malting operations began in 2010 in New England; North Carolina in 2011; and Michigan and West Virginia prior to 2013. In 2013 there were five craft malt operations. There were 59 craft malthouses by early 2017.

== Washington State ==
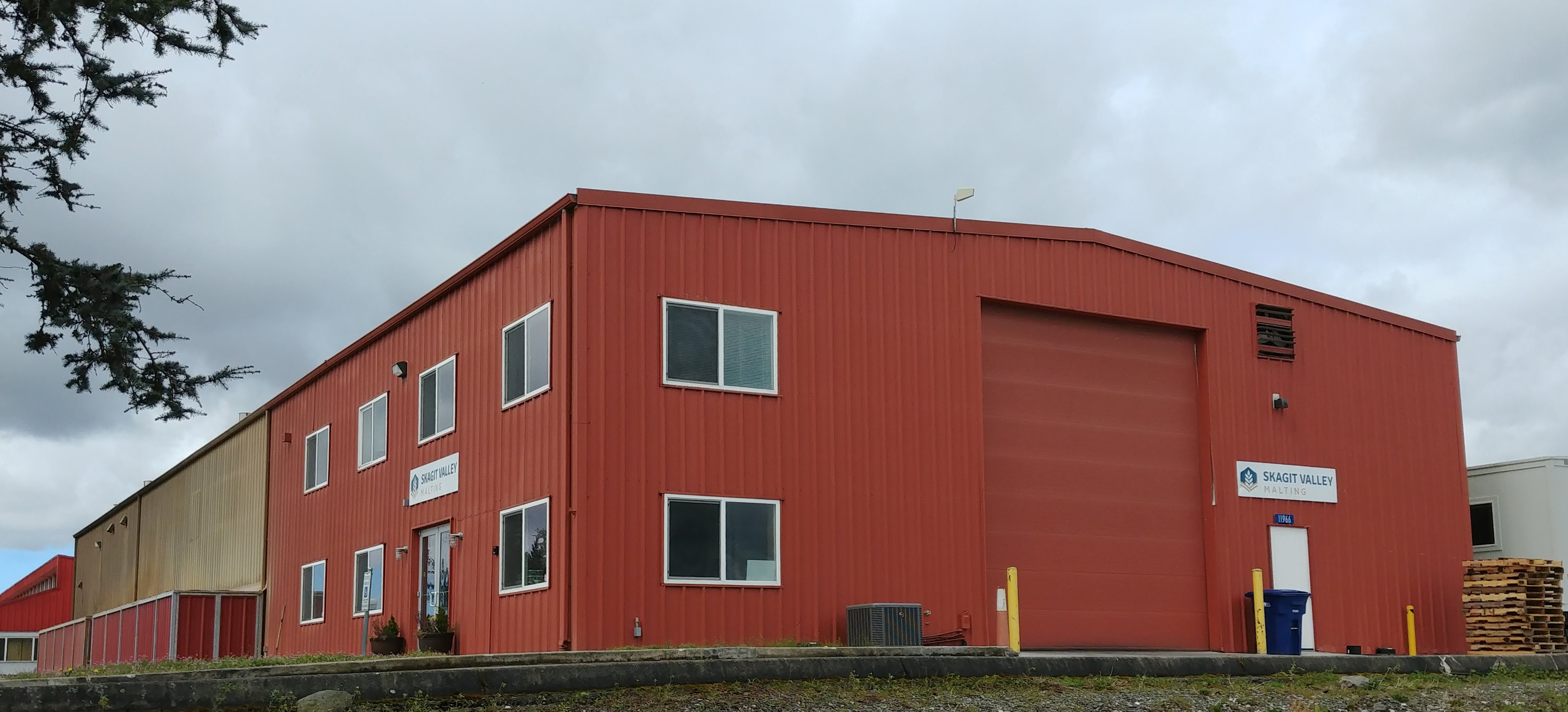
The Skagit Valley Malting Company in Burlington, Washington was one of the first craft malt enterprises in the United States.

The Pacific Northwest craft beer industry has created strong demand for craft malt. A supplier in Skagit Valley was one of the first in the nation, operating since 2014. Washington State University operates the Mount Vernon Research Center which has developed new barley varieties suitable for the local climate and soil. One cultivar called "Richard" has produced over 6,400 kilograms per hectare (5,700 lb/acre).

According to one source, "Skagit Valley malts are naturally lower in protein than those from other North American growing regions".

Farms in the Skagit Valley area have produced barley on a small scale since the 1890s or earlier, and some are in the fourth generation of ownership by the same family.

The arrival of craft malt has been called "The most important development for Seattle craft brewing", and "redefin[ing] ... what it means to be a truly local beer".

A Skagit Valley craft malt company created the United States' first peat-smoked malt, to be used in whiskey made by the largest whiskey distillery west of the Mississippi, in Seattle.

Seattle-based Westland Distillery opened a farm for experimental barley varieties in the Skagit Valley, north of Seattle, as well as purchasing barley for whiskey production from Skagit Valley Malting.

== Organizations ==
Organizations supporting craft malting include the Canadian Malting Barley Technical Center in Winnipeg, the Craft Malting Guild (a trade association) and the Washington State University program mentioned above.
