= West Isle Air =

Airline of the United States

- Founded: 2002
- Parent company: Chelan Seaplanes
- Headquarters: Anacortes, Washington
- Employees: 30

West Isle Air is an airline carrier based in Washington.

== History ==
It was created in the late 1980s. At one time it also operated Chelan Seaplanes. The company generate $2.6 million in annual revenues, and employs 30 total employees across all locations.

== Incidents/Crashes ==
- 2022 Mutiny Bay plane crash - 10 dead

also Cessna 172N Owner/operator: West Isle Air Registration: N733SW MSN: 17268521 Year of manufacture: 1977 Total airframe hrs: 9565 hours Fatalities: Fatalities: 3 / Occupants: 3 Aircraft damage: Substantial Category: Accident Location: Decatur Island, WA
