= List of years in Washington (state) =

This is a list of the individual Washington year pages. In 1889, the United States admitted Washington Territory as the 42nd U.S. state, establishing the State of Washington.

== 21st century ==
2020s
2020
2021
2022
2023
2024
2025
2026
2027
2028
2029

== See also ==
- History of Washington (state)
- Outline of the history of Washington
- List of years in the United States
