= Aquaculture of octopus =

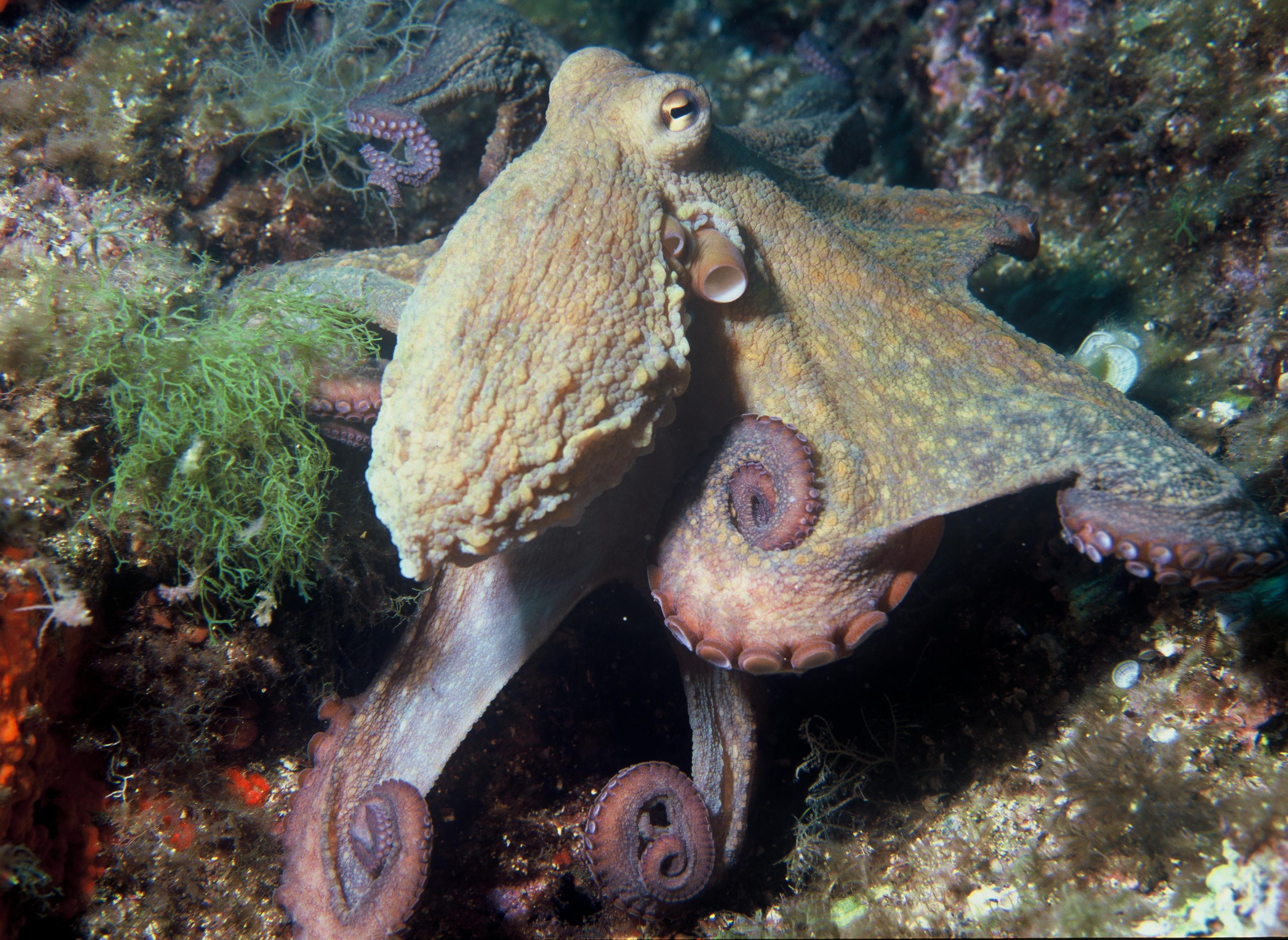
The common octopus, Octopus vulgaris

Octopus aquaculture is the captive raising of octopuses and commercial sale of their meat. A complex and labor-intensive form of farming, octopus aquaculture is being driven by strong market demand in the Mediterranean and in South American and Asian countries. Annual global demand for octopus more than doubled from 1980 to 2019, from roughly 180,000 to about 370,000 tons. The supply of octopus has been constrained by overfishing in many key fisheries and proponents of farming suggest human-induced culturing could help restock natural populations.

Opponents of octopus farming argue that the intelligence of octopuses, their emotional capacity and their solitary and carnivorous character make them particularly ill-suited to intensive captive breeding. Octopuses live short lives, grow quickly and mature early. They typically reach 2 to 3 kg, high weights for an invertebrate. Octopuses are 75 to 90% muscle at their total live weight.

In nature there is little overlap between successive generations, which makes them sensitive to changing environmental conditions. It is currently difficult to culture the early life stages of octopus and maintain high survival rates for their paralarvae, mainly because of high mortality rates by poor zoo-technical conditions or equipment, and also because of conspecific cannibalism. A requirement for live and high-quality food is another constraint: crab zoea or rotifer are necessary, since Artemia, microalgae, or pellets is insufficient. These difficulties have limited the development of fully closed life cycle octopus hatchery systems.

In 2021, Nueva Pescanova Group located in Spain, announced that they had achieved many generations of Octopus vulgaris by culture. The conditions octopuses are to be kept in, type of food, and killing techniques were not disclosed. The company planned to create the first octopus farm in the world, which prompted ethical and scientific controversy.

== Species ==
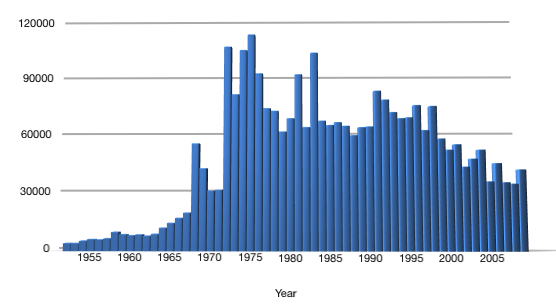
Graph showing the decline in the global capture production (in tonnes) of the common octopus over recent years (source FAO)

The aquaculture potential of several octopuses species has been investigated in recent years, including Octopus maya (red octopus), Octopus bimaculoides (California two-spot octopus), Octopus ocellatus (now renamed Amphioctopus fangsiao), Octopus mimus (changos octopus), Enteroctopus megalocyathus (Patagonian red octopus) and Robsonella fontaniana.

The common octopus, Octopus vulgaris, appears to be the most serious candidate for aquaculture in terms of its biological and market potential. It has a worldwide distribution in tropical, subtropical and temperate waters. It is a benthic species occurring from the coastal line to the outer edge of the continental shelf, at depths to 200 m and in very diverse marine habitats. The common octopus is easily adapted to captive conditions and has a rapid growth rate of 5% body weight per day. It also has a high feed conversion rate with 30–60% of ingested food being incorporated in its own weight, and a high fecundity of 100,000–500,000 eggs per female.

== Temperature ==
There is an optimum temperature at which a cold-blooded species does best in terms of growth, survival and food intake. The common octopus is sensitive to temperature, with an optimum range for commercial growth of 16–21 °C. Above its optimal thermal range, growth and food intake decrease, and above 23 °C loss in weight and increased mortality has been recorded. A narrow thermal band can mean seasonality in growth due to seasonal variations in water temperatures. The incorporation of temperature control mechanisms, such as in the use of closed or onshore farming systems, can reduce seasonal variances in production.

== Nutrition ==
Crustaceans, such as crabs and lobster are an important dietary constituent of both natural and captive populations of octopus. Fish are not as important. Fish-based diets have been shown to provide both lower growth rates and food conversion to growth ratios in captive octopus. This may be because of high lipid levels in fish flesh. Cephalopods, such as octopus and squids, show low lipid digestibility as a result of low lipid requirements. Consequently, a large component of the fish feed will not be taken up. Crustacean diets are favored possibly as a result of their high protein relative to lipid levels.

Whether octopus farming is profitable depends in large part on how much it costs to maintain a steady supply of crustaceans. Economic profitability can be maximized without significantly compromising biological productivity by incorporating a mix of fish and crustacean-based feed strategies. García and Cerezo Velverde (2006) found a feeding regime of one day of crab followed by three days of fish can reduce the cost of producing one kg of octopus by a predicted value of €2.96.

== Juveniles ==
Commercial aquaculture so far has been confined to starting with young juveniles caught in the wild, weighing about 750 g. In Spain, these juveniles are purchased from local fishermen and transferred to offshore floating sea cages. There they are fattened with bycatch (fish, molluscs and crabs) for several months until a commercial size, about 3 kilograms, is reached. However, acquiring juveniles in this way, from the wild, further increases the fishing pressure on octopus stocks that are already managed badly, possibly producing cascades in marine ecosystems. A cost analysis of this practice found that over 40% of total costs went into acquiring the juveniles. The profitability of this approach is low, depending as it does on fishing and the supply of sub-adults, a costly and highly variable process.

== Paralarva ==
The bottleneck currently hindering the commercial development of octopus aquaculture is the difficulty of rearing octopus during their early paralarva stage. Paralarva is the name given to the larva of cephalopods. Paralarvae are small, less than 3 millimetres at hatching, with a long planktonic life stage. Current rearing techniques are inadequate, resulting in very high mortality rates. Results vary when octopus paralarvae are fed different combinations of prey. The best results have been with a mix of brine shrimp and other living prey, such as crab zoeae. However the survival and settlement rates of the paralarvae is typically low in such studies, highlighting the difficulties in raising octopus paralarvae. Maintaining high survival rates for paralarvae appears to be the main factor limiting the development of a fully closed life cycle octopus hatchery system.

To achieve both profitable and environmentally sustainable results, much research has been focused on paralarval rearing. In 2005, scientists from the principal research groups in the field concluded the key factor affecting paralarval mortality is nutrition, making nutritional research the highest priority. There is "no reason not to believe that the aquacultural rearing of octopus will be of great economic potential" as soon as the rearing technology and nutritional issues have been addressed. Research in these areas is promising.

== Opposition ==
Octopus aquaculture faces opposition on ethical and environmental grounds. Studies have indicated that octopuses are highly intelligent and show evidence of being sentient. Octopuses are also naturally solitary and carnivorous, and in high-density captivity frequently cannibalize each other. Critics argue that these qualities make octopuses unsuitable for large-scale farming. Critics also argue that the incomplete understanding of octopus behavior and cognition makes it impossible to ensure humane living conditions and humane slaughter methods for farmed octopuses.

Environmental concerns include the fact that as carnivores, farmed octopuses will most likely require wild-caught feed fish, which could contribute to overfishing of feed fish species. Other concerns include possible pollution and resource consumption of the octopus farm facilities themselves.

The US states of Washington and California have passed legislation banning octopus farming. In 2024, legislation was introduced in the United States Senate to ban octopus farming nationwide, but it was not enacted.

In the UK, animal charity the RSPCA and think tank The Food Policy Institute have opposed octopus farming.
