= Skagit Valley Tulip Festival =

Annual tulip festival in Washington, United States

Coordinates: 48°25′N 122°25′W

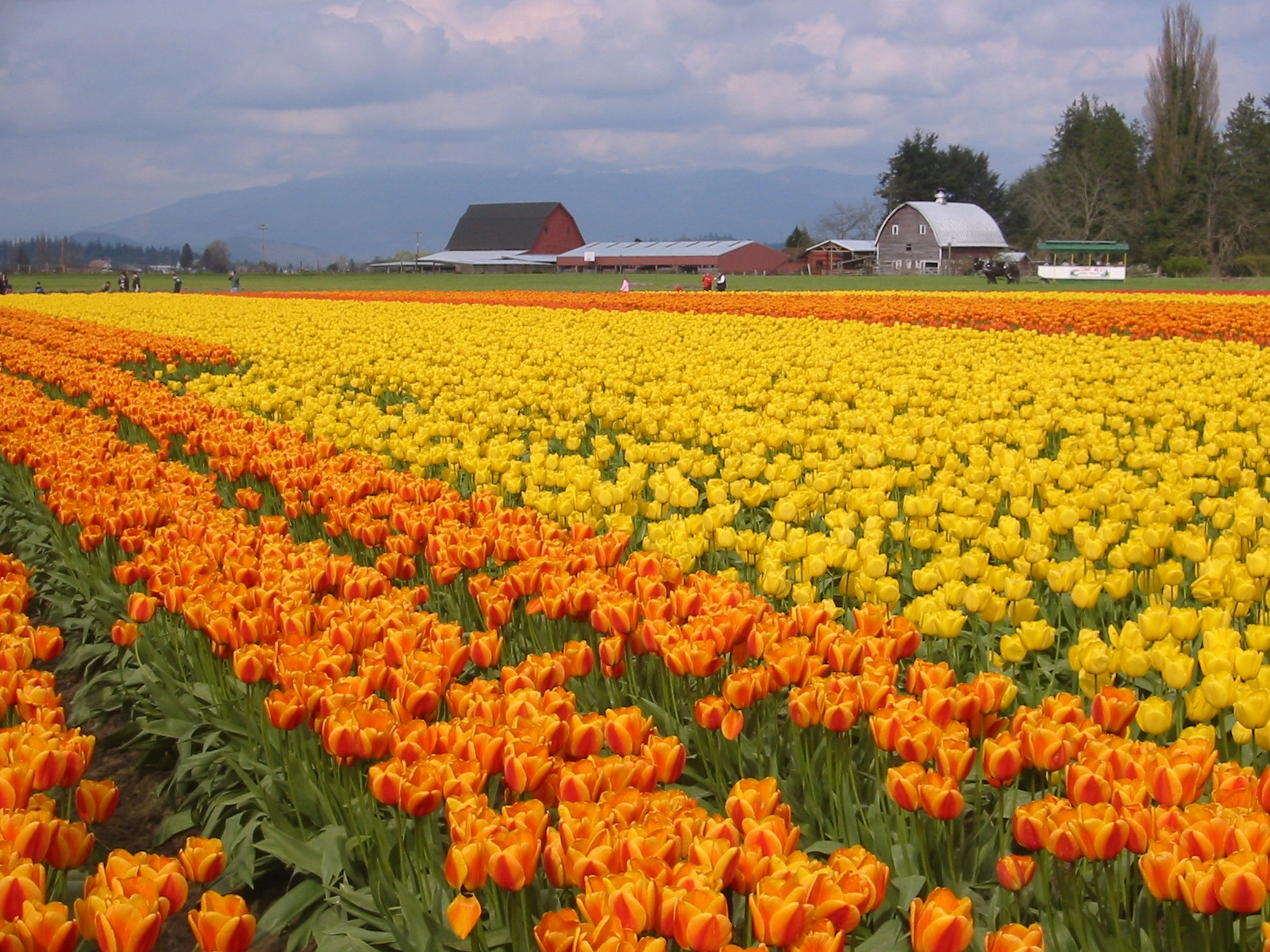
- Date: April 1 – April 30
- Frequency: Annual
- Locations: Skagit Valley, Washington, U.S.
- Inaugurated: 1984
- Participants: 1 million+
- Website: www.tulipfestival.org

The Skagit Valley Tulip Festival is a tulip festival in the U.S. state of Washington. It is held annually in the Skagit Valley, a region of Skagit County, from April 1 to 30.

== History ==
=== Background ===
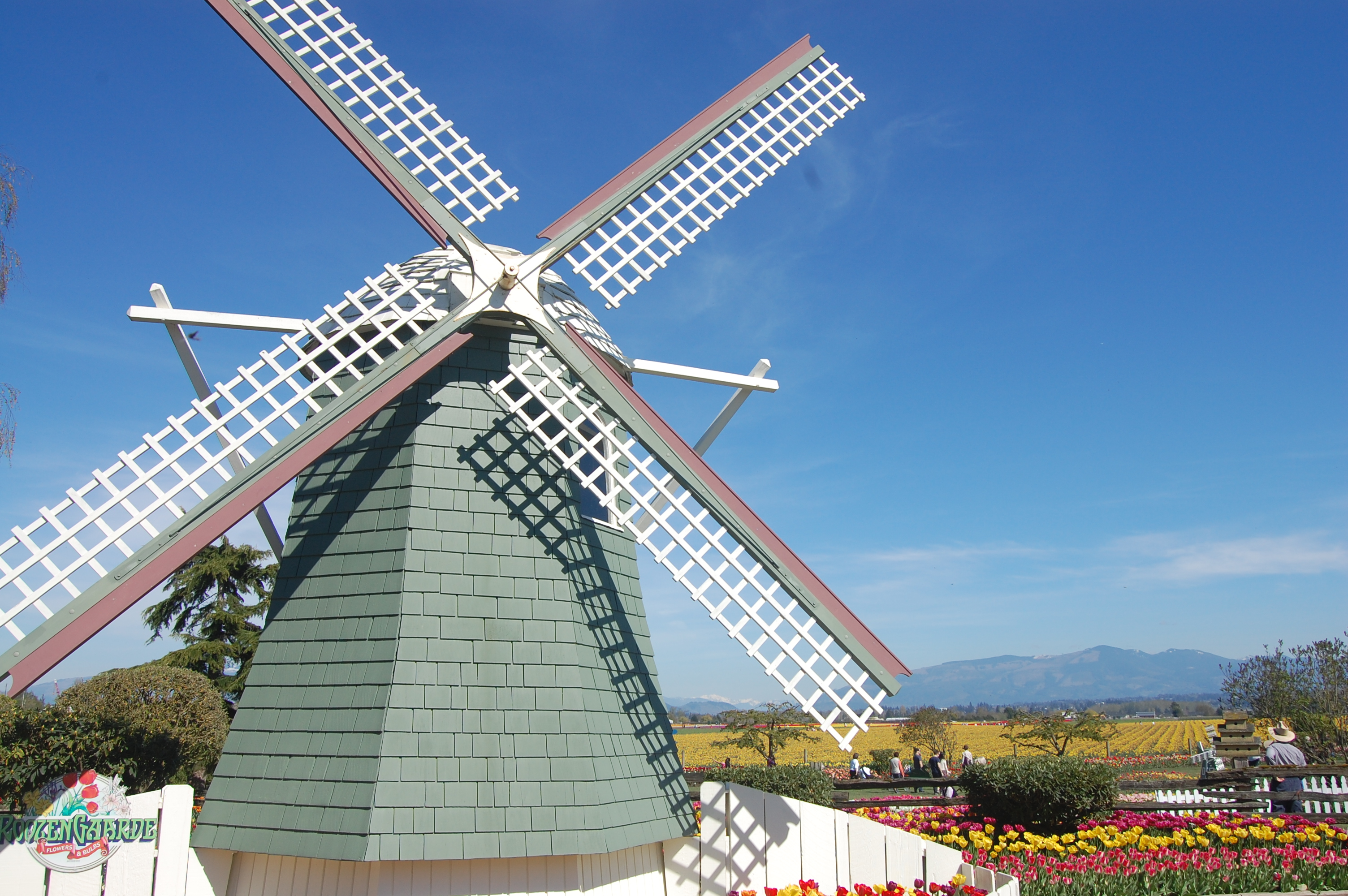
Roozengaarde is a popular location for tulip viewing during the festival.

Around 1883, George Gibbs, an immigrant from England, moved to Orcas Island, where he began to grow apples and hazelnuts. Nine years later, he purchased five dollars' worth of flower bulbs to grow, and when he dug them up a couple years later and saw how they had multiplied, realized the potential for bulb-growing in the Puget Sound region. He contacted Dutch growers in Holland to learn about the business, only to find the Dutch to be highly secretive about their commercial practices. However, when he shipped off a few bulbs to Holland, the impressed Dutch growers traveled to Orcas Island to see for themselves how tulips could grow outside Holland.

In 1899, Gibbs wrote to the United States Department of Agriculture about the commercial prospects of bulb-growing in the region, and they took interest. In 1905, they sent Gibbs 15,000 bulbs imported from Holland to grow as an experiment, under a contract. The experiment was so successful that the United States Department of Agriculture established its own 10-acre test garden in 1908 around Bellingham, which proved successful enough for the Bellingham Tulip Festival to begin in 1920 to showcase and celebrate the success of the bulb industry.

The Bellingham Tulip Festival was discontinued in 1930, due to the Great Depression and bulb freezes in 1916, 1925, and 1929 that brought heavy losses to the growers. Subsequently, the growers moved south into Skagit County.

In 1946, William Roozen arrived in the United States, leaving behind a successful bulb-growing business spanning six generations in Holland. After working on several farms, Roozen started his own in Skagit County in 1950. In 1955, he purchased the Washington Bulb Company, making him the leader among the four flower-growing families in the area, and making the Washington Bulb Company the leading grower of tulip, daffodil, and iris bulbs in North America. The farm operates a public display garden and gift shop called Roozengaarde, founded in 1985. It is among the largest attractions at the festival and spans 50 acres (20 ha) with approximately 1 million bulbs.

=== Modern festival ===
Local tulip growers showed their bulbs through display gardens prior to the formal establishment of a festival. The Mount Vernon Chamber of Commerce organized the first Skagit Valley Tulip Festival as a three-day event in 1984 to add festivities during the bloom month. The event later grew into a month-long event with street fairs, art shows, and sporting events.

The 2020 festival was cancelled on March 25 due to the coronavirus pandemic. Festival organizers had initially planned for a smaller event with limited numbers of people allowed at display gardens and later car-only tours, but cancelled after the state government issued a stay-at-home order. Tulip Town, a major festival venue, announced plans to use virtual tours and flower donations for hospital workers to recoup their lost revenue. Several tulip fields were prematurely cut to prevent people from visiting the area.

== Attendance and impact ==
The festival claims to be Washington's largest, with over one million visitors. In 2003, Travel + Leisure put attendance at 500,000; in 2008, at least one news source put attendance at 350,000; and in 2023, KING 5 estimated the festival drew 400,000 to 500,000 visitors.

The 2024 festival generated an estimated $83 million in revenue within Skagit County.

== Awards ==
The festival was selected as the best street fair in KING-TV's "Best of the Northwest" awards in 2010.

== Gallery ==
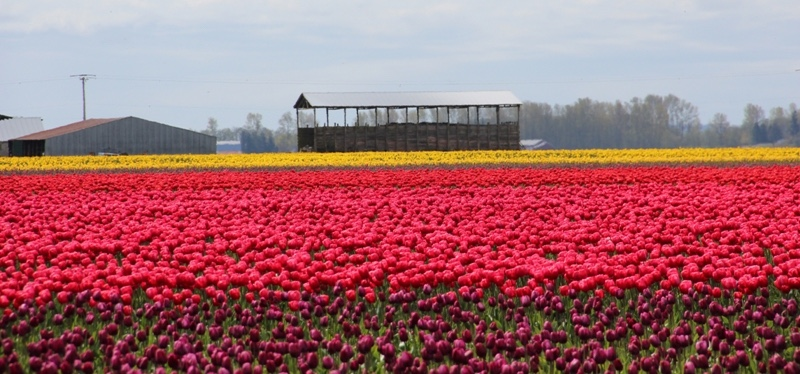
A field of tulips at Tulip Town in Mount Vernon during the 2013 festival

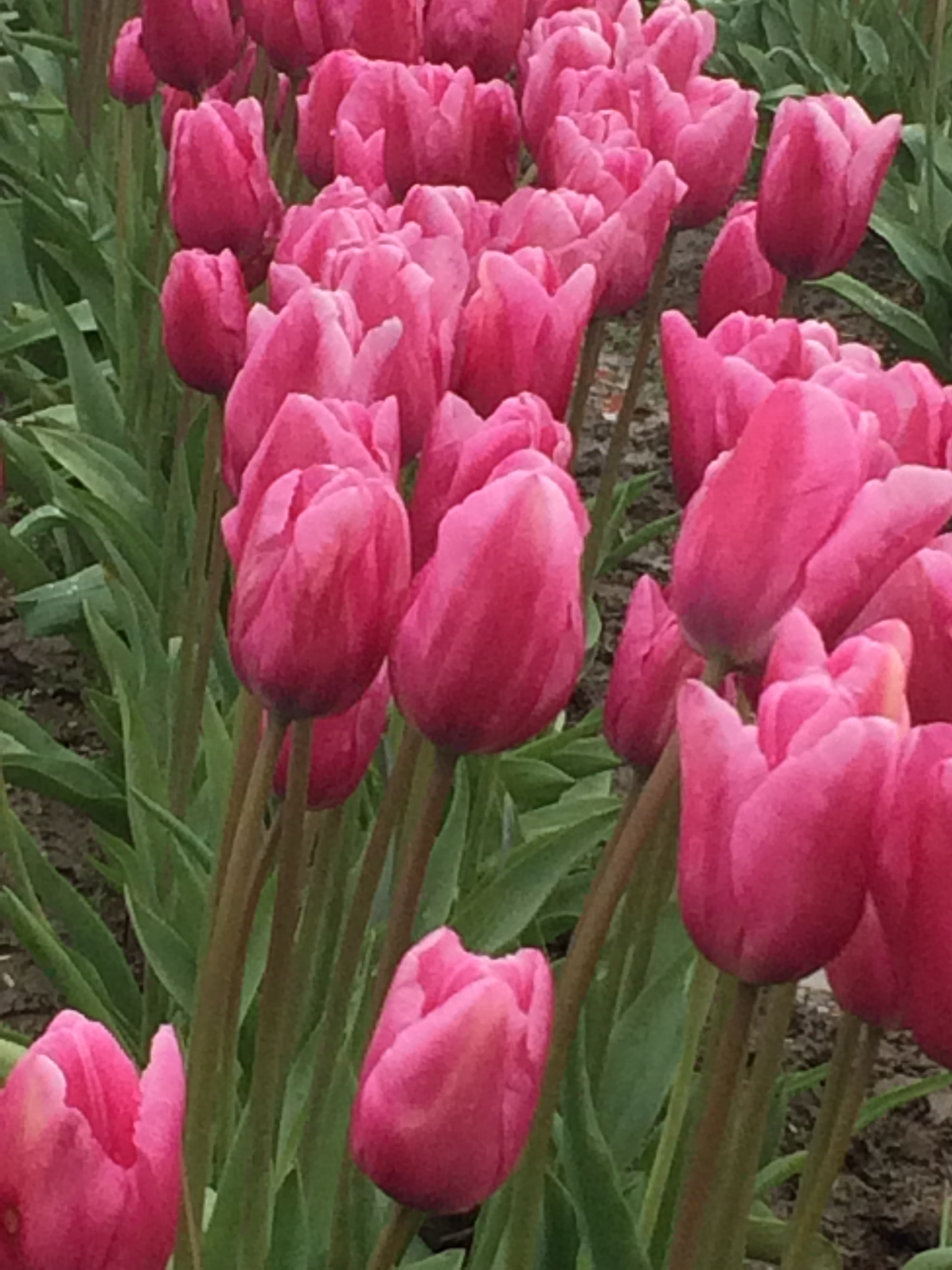
Picture taken from the 2015 Tulip Festival
