= Killing of Eina Kwon =

2023 killing in Seattle, United States

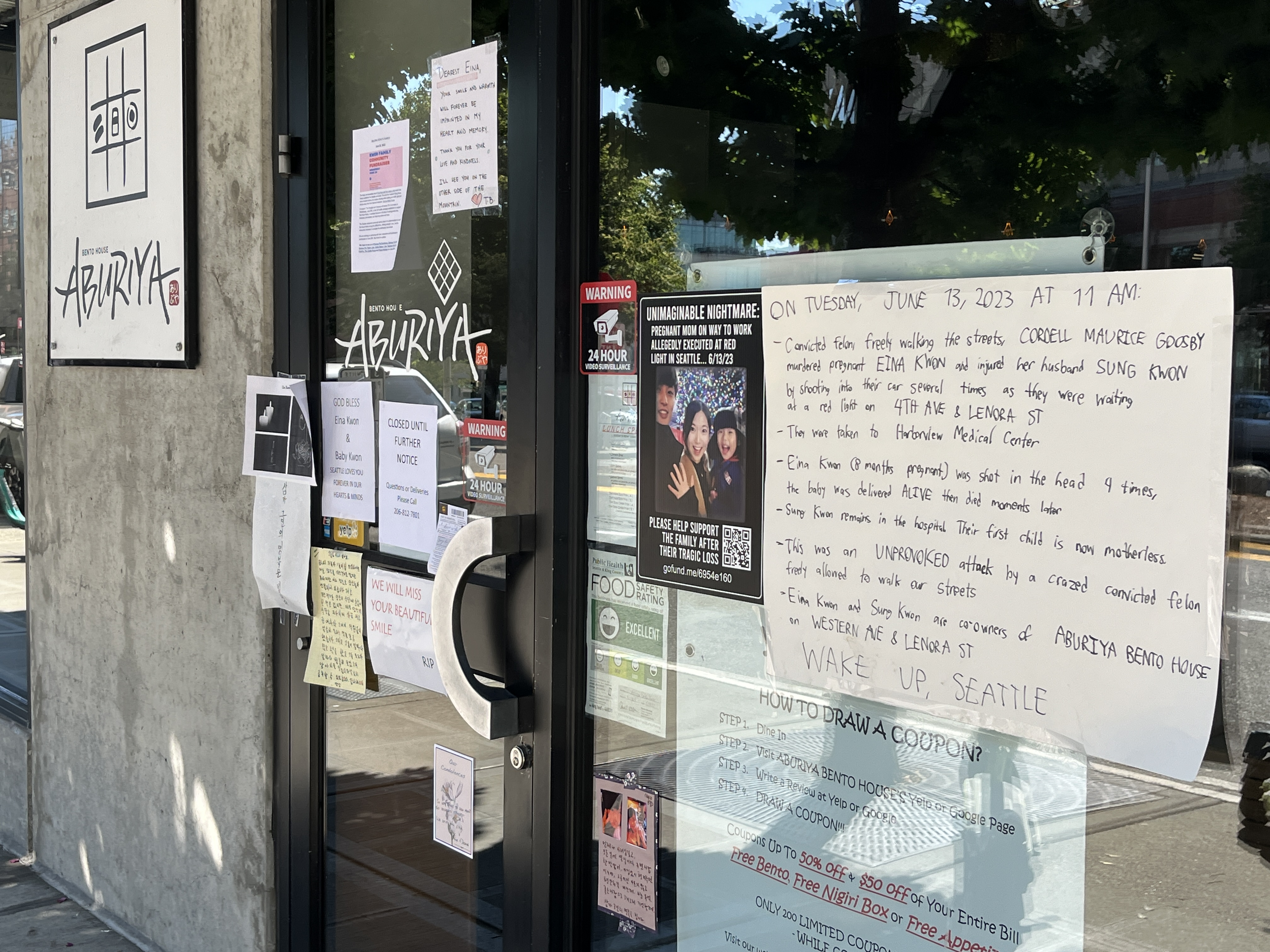
- Memorial outside Aburiya Bento House, 2023
- Time: June 2023
- Location: Belltown, Seattle, Washington, U.S.
- Deaths: 2 (including an unborn baby)
- Injuries: 1
- Accused: Cordell Maurice Goosby
- Charges: First degree murder Attempted first degree murder
- Verdict: Not guilty by reason of insanity

At 11:15 a.m. on June 13, 2023, 34-year-old Eina Kwon was shot and killed in Belltown, Seattle, Washington, United States. Kwon was a restaurant owner who was eight months pregnant with her second child at the time.

== Shooting ==
Kwon and her husband, Evan Sung Kwon, were shot in their car at the intersection of 4th Street and Lenora Street, near their restaurant Aburiya Bento House.

Cordell Maurice Goosby is alleged to have fired six shots from a stolen semi-automatic handgun into the car at random. He has been charged with first-degree murder. Evan was shot in the arm and received treatment for his injury at a local hospital. He was discharged the following morning.

Goosby stayed at the scene and was arrested for the shootings, to which he immediately confessed.

== Aftermath ==
Kwon and her unborn baby died from her injuries. Her funeral at Acacia Memorial Park and Funeral Home on June 23 was open to the public.

=== Community response ===
Susanna Keilman, a former Republican state legislative candidate from Pierce County, organized a rally at the site where Kwon was killed. Up to 300 community members observed a moment of silence and also marched in Kwon's memory. A number of restaurants have raised funds and donated a proportion of their daily sales, for the family. A GoFundMe raised over $280,000 by June 28.

== Accused and legal proceedings ==
Goosby has both a criminal record and a history of mental illness. He told the police that he had seen a gun in the car, but video of the incident seems to contradict this. No motive has been determined; Goosby had never met the couple before. The accused pleaded not guilty on June 29. On March 20, 2026, Goosby was found not guilty by reason of insanity.
