= Westland Distillery =

Distillery in Seattle

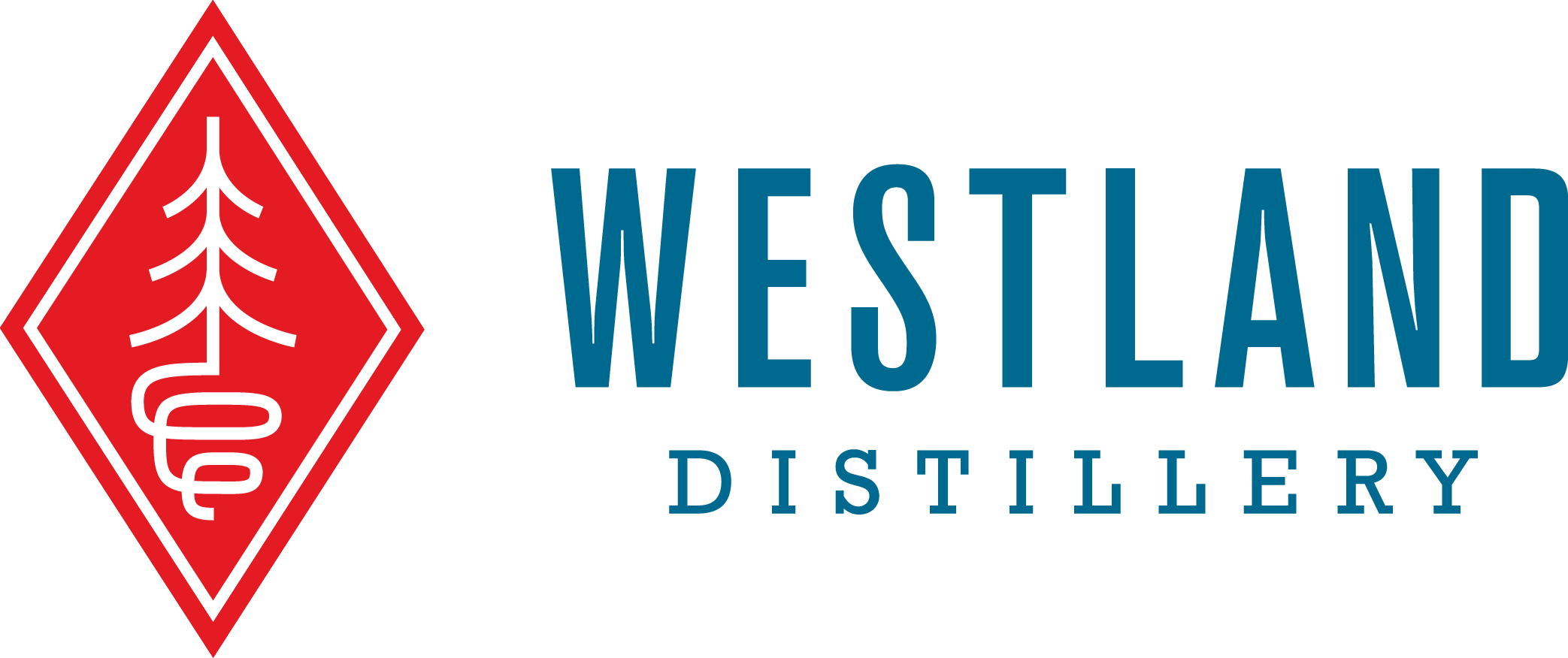
- Location: Seattle, Washington
- Coordinates: 47.5766°N 122.3347°W
- Owner: Rémy Cointreau
- Founded: 2011
- Founder: Matt Hofmann; Emerson Lamb
- Architect: Urbanadd, Upward Architecture
- Status: Active
- Water source: Cedar River watershed
- No. of stills: 2
- Capacity: 7,570 litres (2,000 US gal); 5,670 litres (1,500 US gal)
- Website: westlanddistillery.com

Flagship
- Age(s): 40 months
- Cask type(s): Cooper’s Reserve New American Oak; Cooper’s Reserve Used American Oak; First Fill Ex-Bourbon; First Fill Ex-Oloroso Hogsheads and Butts; Second Fill Ex-Oloroso Hogsheads and Butts
- ABV: 46% (92 proof)
- Characteristics: Nose: Custard filling, marionberry compote, maple brittle, toasted marshmallow. Palate: Almond nougat, crème brûlée, black tea, white flower petals, malted milk balls.

Solum Edition 3
- Age(s): 48 months
- Cask type(s): 2nd Fill Cooper’s Reserve American Oak (68%); Cooper’s Reserve New American Oak (32%)
- ABV: 50% (100 proof)
- Characteristics: Nose: Vanilla custard, pralines, grilled pineapple, croissant. Palate: Toasted sourdough, cedar, baked pear, candied ginger.

Colere Edition 4
- Age(s): 71 months
- Cask type(s): 2nd Fill Cooper’s Reserve (Heavy Toast / Light Char) (47.5%); 2nd Fill Cooper’s Select (Light Toast / Heavy Char) (47.5%); 1st Fill Ex-Bourbon (5%)
- ABV: 50% (100 proof)
- Characteristics: Nose: Pear skin, dried apricot, light brown sugar, croissant, fresh tangerine Palate: Apple turnover, dried fruit mix, cocoa butter, jasmine green tea.

Garryana Edition 9
- Age(s): 5 years
- Cask type(s): Virgin Quercus garryana; First Fill ex-Bourbon; First Fill Ex-Oloroso Butt
- ABV: 46% (92 proof)
- Characteristics: Nose: Burnt marshmallow, biscuit, mocha, almond cream. Palate: Ground clove, cinnamon stick, peppermint tea, bread pudding.

Westland Distillery is a distillery in Seattle. Their Garryana single malt whiskey was placed third best in the world in a 2023 blind taste test conducted by Whisky Advocate magazine. Garryana is aged in barrels made from Pacific Northwest native Garry oak, Quercus garryana. The company has a farm for experimental craft malting barley varieties in the Skagit Valley, north of Seattle, as well as purchasing barley from Skagit Valley Malting there.

== Theft ==
In July 2025, Westland Distillery was the victim of a sophisticated theft where a truck went to the Burlington, Washington warehouse with apparently valid documents and drove off with ten-year old Garryana and other whiskeys worth at least $924,000. The incident was investigated by the Skagit County Sheriff in August, and reported to the public in September.

== Awards ==
In 2023 the distillery's Garryana 8th Edition was ranked third worldwide on Whisky Advocate's annual Top 20 Whiskeys list, making it the highest-ranked American whiskey that year.

In 2024 Westland's Wine Cask Finish American Single Malt placed #20 on Whisky Advocate's Top 20 Whiskeys of 2024, marking the second consecutive year that the distillery was included in the publication's international rankings. In 2024 the distillery was also awarded Double Gold medal at the New York International Spirits Competition for one of their Cask expressions, judged by a panel of industry professionals.

In international competitions, Westland has maintained a consistent presence at the World Whiskies Awards. In 2023, the distillery was named Best American Single Malt, also securing a Category Winner title and additional Gold and silver medals for various releases. The following year, the Solum Edition 2 received a bronze medal in the World Whiskies Awards' single malt category.
