= Inland saline aquaculture =

Farming of aquatic life using inland sources of saline groundwater

Inland saline aquaculture is the farming or culture of aquatic animals and plants using inland (i.e. non-coastal) sources of saline groundwater rather than the more common coastal aquaculture methods. As a side benefit, it can be used to reduce the amount of salt in underground water tables, leading to an improvement in the surrounding land usage for agriculture. Due to its nature, it is only commercially possible in areas that have large reserves of saline groundwater, such as Australia.

== Systems ==
=== Extensive culture ===
Extensive culture aquaculture systems are simple and with low levels of intervention. An example of this would be a salty dam, lake or pond stocked with trout, where no food is needed to be added as the fish can feed off what naturally occurs in the water. While they required little capital investment or management time, their productivity is relatively low.

=== Intensive culture ===
Intensive culture requires more capital outlay and greater management time. Often they use purpose-built facilities (e.g. tanks), artificial food and aeration and constant monitoring of water quality. It has much higher productivity rates, but associated high levels of feeding, labour, water pumping and capital costs.

=== Semi-intensive culture ===
Semi-intensive culture is in between extensive and intensive culture. It may range from adding some artificial feed to an extensive system or some aeration and waste management. Costs rise as more inputs are added.

== Suitable species ==
=== Fish ===
- Rainbow trout - robust, fast growth, require low water temperatures, may be limited to winter production
- Brown trout - robust, fast growth, require low water temperatures, may be limited to winter production
- Barramundi - needs higher temperatures, tolerant in a large range of salinity levels
- Macquarie perch - wide tolerance over range of salinity and water quality levels, not suitable for commercial quantities
- Silver Perch - suitable for extensive and intensive systems, prefers warmer water
- Snapper

=== Other species ===
- Crustaceans - brine, shrimp, prawns - these can be included as part of a wastewater treatment program as some have the capacity to quickly clean water
- Molluscs - mussels
- Algae - both unicellular and "seaweeds" can be used to extract a range of high-value products, including pharmaceutical chemicals.

=== Mixing species ===
==== Chain system ====
Some inland aquaculture systems involve using a range of separated species to increase its productivity. An example of this would be where water is used to culture a fish specifies, which is then diverted to tanks of shellfish which feed on the fine particles left by the fish, which then is diverted to algae species which remove the dissolved nutrients, and then last of all the water is sent to a horticultural system.

==== Polyculture ====
Separate from this type of system is polyculture, where two or more species are cultured in the same water, possibly multiple fish species or a fish and mollusc species.

== See also ==
- List of harvested aquatic animals by weight
- Alkali soil#Remediation and utilization via aquaculture
