= Useless Bay (Georgia) =

Useless Bay is a swamp in the U.S. state of Georgia. It is located at 31°3′11.09″N 82°48′50.17″W.

Useless Bay was so named because it is very difficult to navigate.
