= Useless Bay (Washington) =

Bay in Washington, United States

Coordinates: 47.9827294°N 122.4897839°W

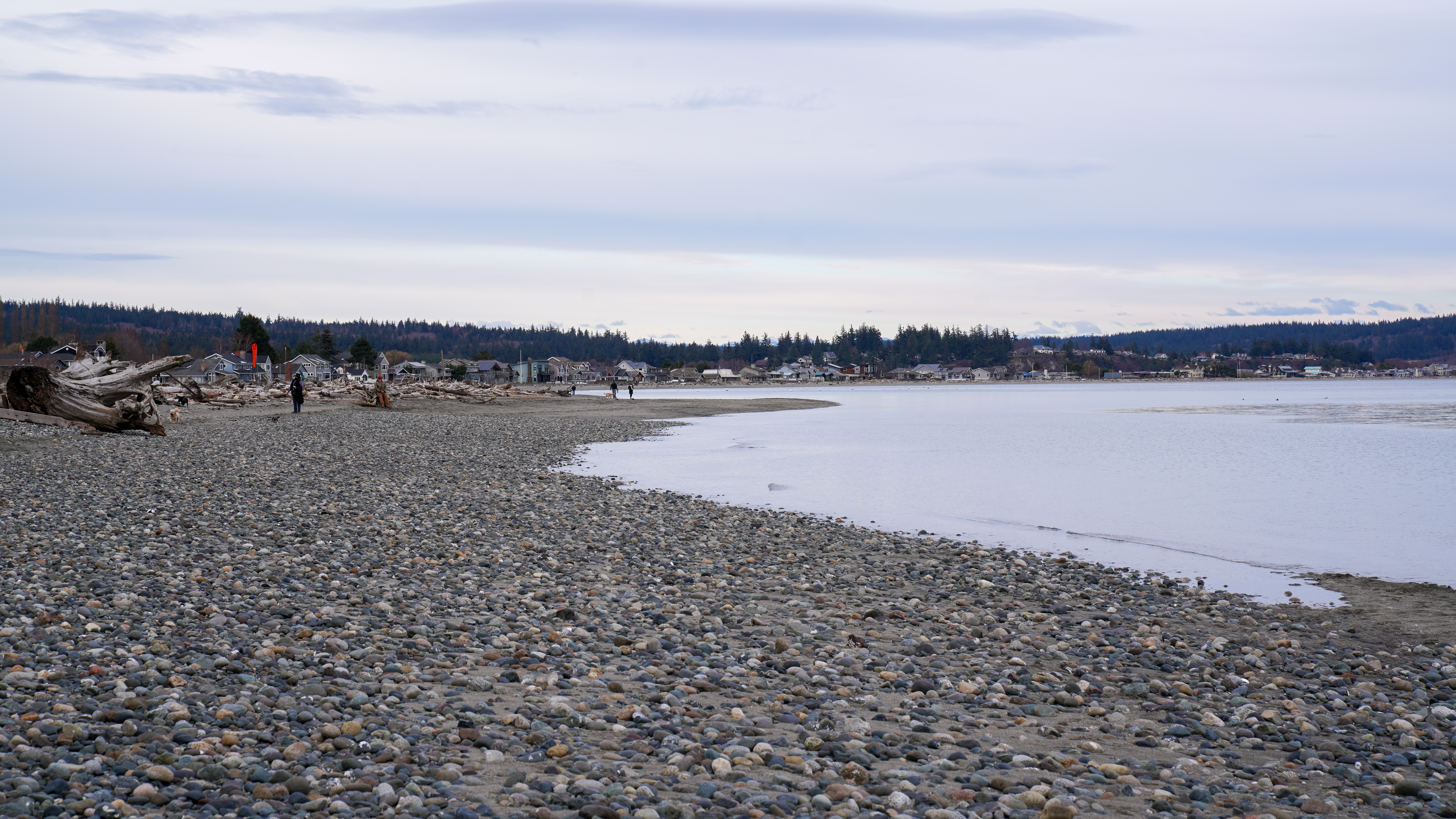
Useless Bay at Sunlight Beach hamlet

Useless Bay is a bay in the U.S. state of Washington. Part of Puget Sound, Useless Bay is located in Island County near the southern end of Whidbey Island, between Cultus Bay and Mutiny Bay.

Useless Bay was so named on account of frequent inclement weather.
