= End of Watch Ride to Remember =

2020 charity long-distance motorcycle ride

End of Watch Ride to Remember was a charity long-distance motorcycle ride that started and ended in Spokane, Washington, traveling 17,000 miles (27,000 km) around the United States between June 1 and August 7, 2020. The purpose of the ride, organized by ex–Yakima County sheriff's deputy Jagrut Shah, chairman of sponsoring organization called Beyond the Call of Duty, was to honor 146 U.S. police officers killed in the line of duty the prior year by visiting each of the departments where they served. "End of watch" is a phrase used in connection with officers killed on duty. The event was to be funded by sponsors, until many pulled out following the 2020 George Floyd protests against police violence, at which point the organizers self-funded.
