= University of Washington Quad =

University outdoor space

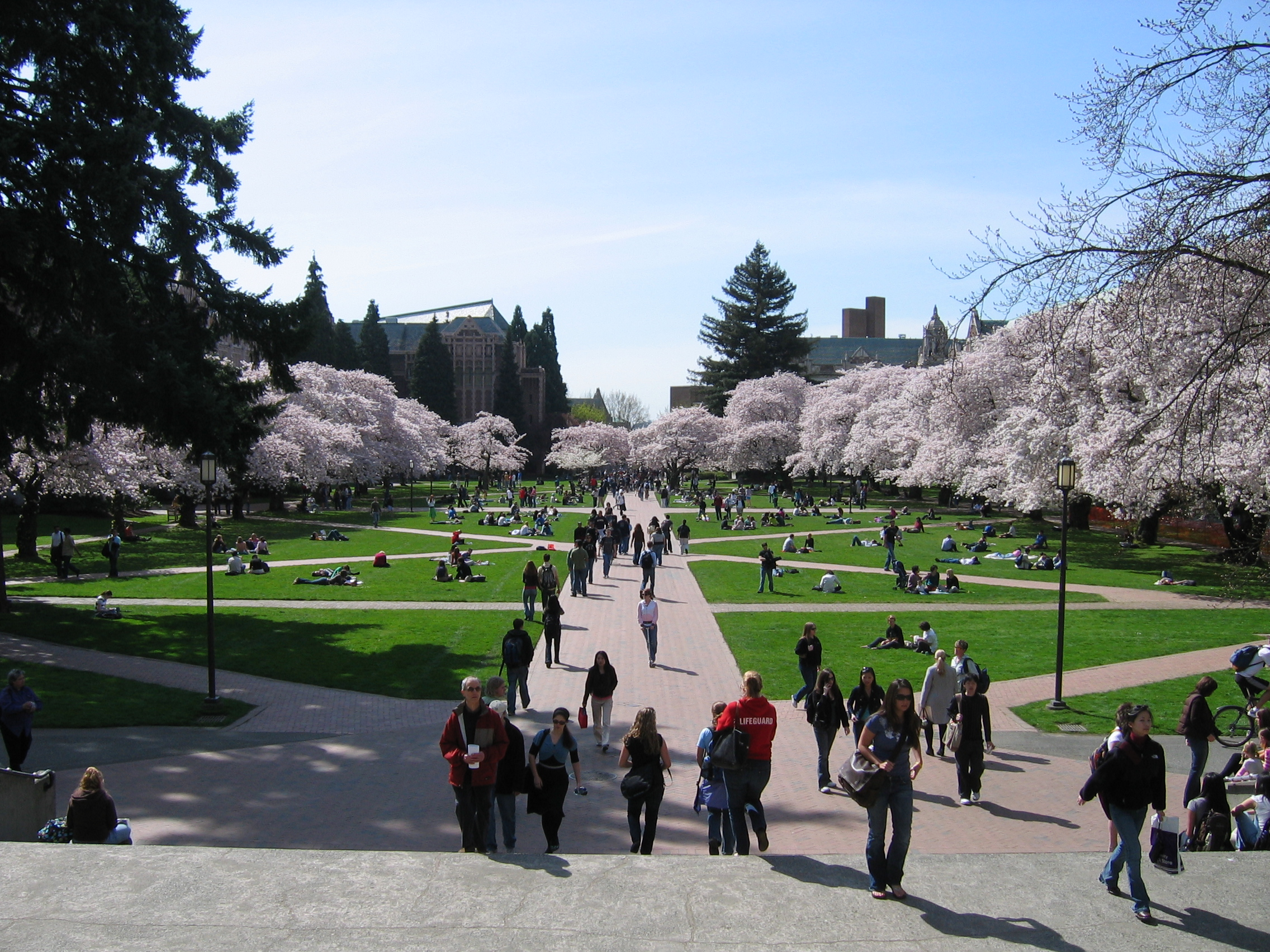

The Liberal Arts Quadrangle, more popularly known as the Quad, is the main quadrangle at the University of Washington in Seattle, Washington. It is often considered the school's trademark attraction. Raitt Hall and Savery Hall frame the northwestern boundary while Gowen, Smith, and Miller Halls frame the southeast. At the top of the quad sits the latest buildings on the quad, the Art and Music Buildings. The quad is lined with thirty Yoshino cherry trees, which blossom between mid-March and early April.

== History ==
The history of the Quad traces back to the beginnings of the Alaska-Yukon-Pacific Exposition campus. Although the Quad was not finished until 1950, its layout was produced as early as 1915 by its designers Henry Suzzallo, an early UW President, and architect Carl Gould, who designed numerous buildings on the UW campus. In 1915, the Board of Regents adopted Gould's "Revised General Plan of the University of Washington", known more commonly as the Regents Plan.

The first building built to enclose the Quad was Raitt Hall, which was named for Effie Isobel Raitt, director of the University of Washington School of Home Economics (a school founded in 1930 and incorporated into the University of Washington School of Nutritional Sciences and Textiles in 1978; currently part of the University of Washington School of Public Health). On a rainy day, Raitt invited legislators to the wartime shack that housed the School of Economics. Issues with the building led to the allocation of funds within the Regents Plan to build a new structure for the school.

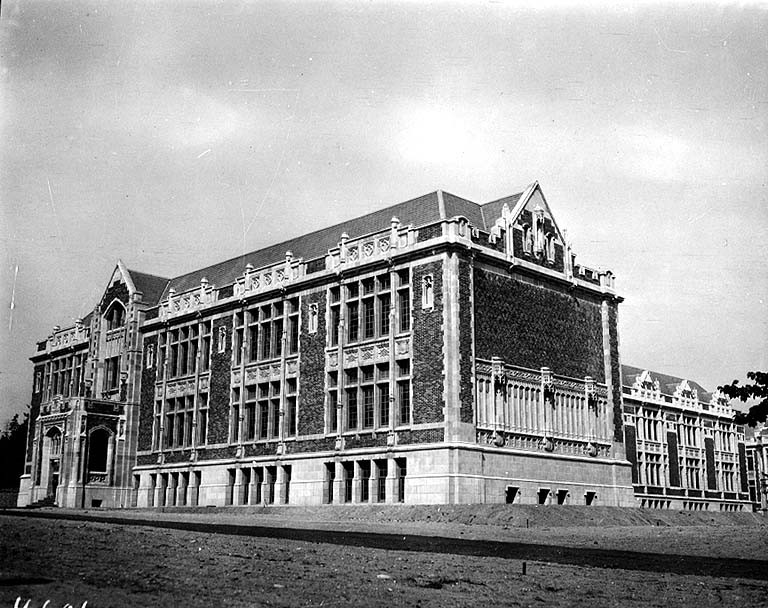
Philosophy Hall in 1922, photograph by John Nathan Cobb

In 1920, two more structures were built in the Quad. Student payments into the University building fund financed the construction of Commerce Hall, which was completed in 1917. This method of funding also marked the first instance of tuition for higher education in the state of Washington. Philosophy Hall, whose construction was interrupted by World War I, was finished in 1920. It was later combined with Commerce Hall to form what is presently known as Savery Hall. Between World War I and World War II, the University built three more structures in the Liberal Arts Quadrangle. Miller Hall, finished in 1922; Gowen Hall, finished in 1932; and Smith Hall, finished in 1939 marked the complete enclosing of the Quad.

Gould and Suzzallo's plan was finished upon the construction of the Art and Music Buildings. The Art building was built in 1949 and the Music building was finished the following year in 1950. These two buildings, each with a single tenant that towers above the space between them, act as a grand gateway for those descending the three-tiered staircase into the Quad's northeastern end.

=== Cherry blossoms ===
The quad is lined with thirty Yoshino cherry trees, which draw sightseers when they blossom, typically between mid-March and early April. The cherry trees were bought by the UW in 1939 and initially planted at the Washington Park Arboretum. The trees were moved onto the campus's Liberal Arts Quad in 1962 after construction began on State Route 520, which cut across part of the arboretum. The decision to move the cherry trees to the Liberal Arts Quad was likely made by a group of people including President Charles Odegaard, Frederick Mann, Ernest Conrad, Eric Hoyte, and other staff from the architect office. However, "the outset of the unique arrangement of the cherry trees in the Quad can be easily traced down to one man. Eric Hoyte, the landscape architect, designed the arrangement." In 2014, an additional 32 trees were donated with funds from the Japan Commerce Association and will be planted at Rainier Vista and in the arboretum.

== Gallery ==
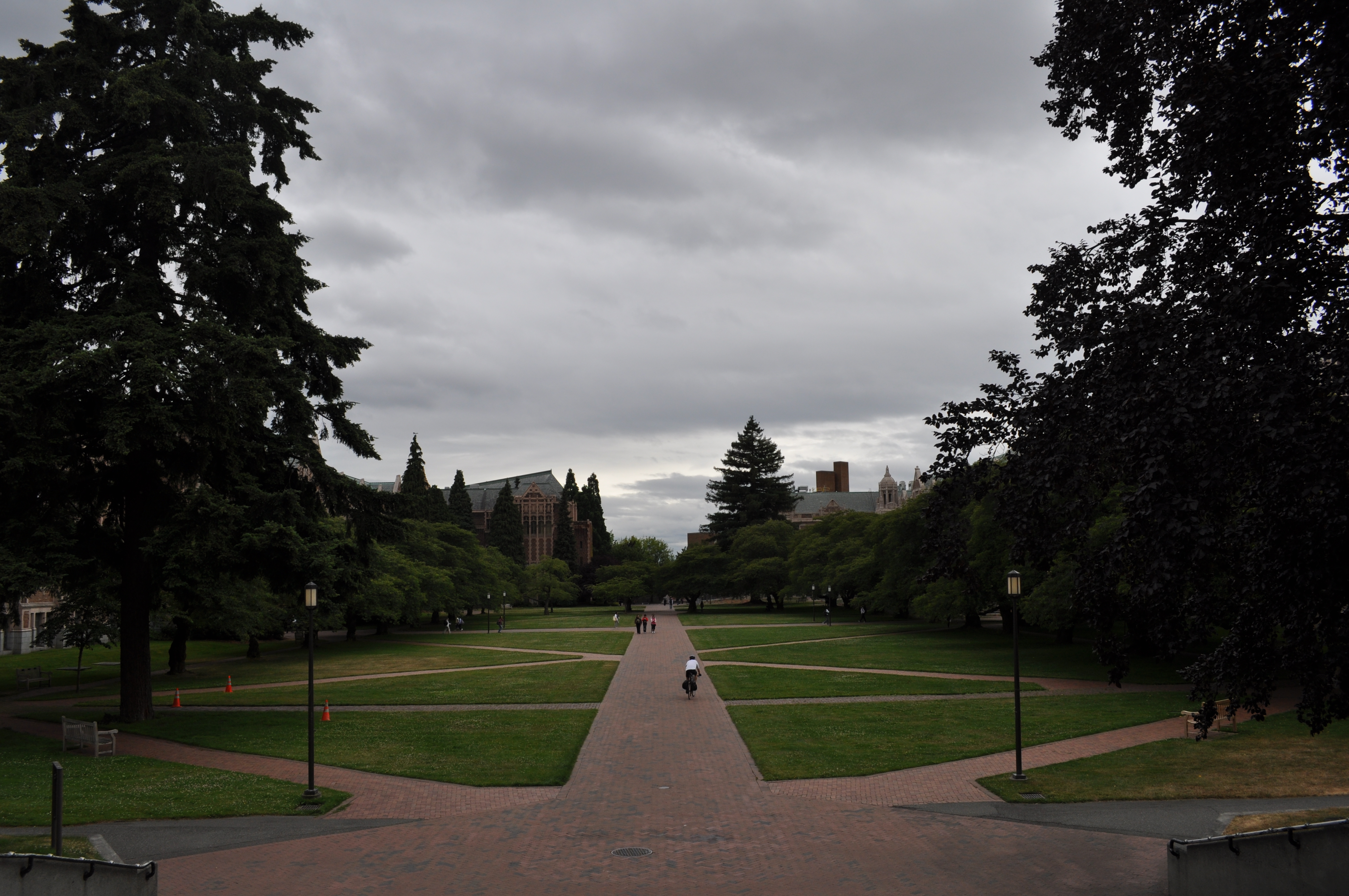

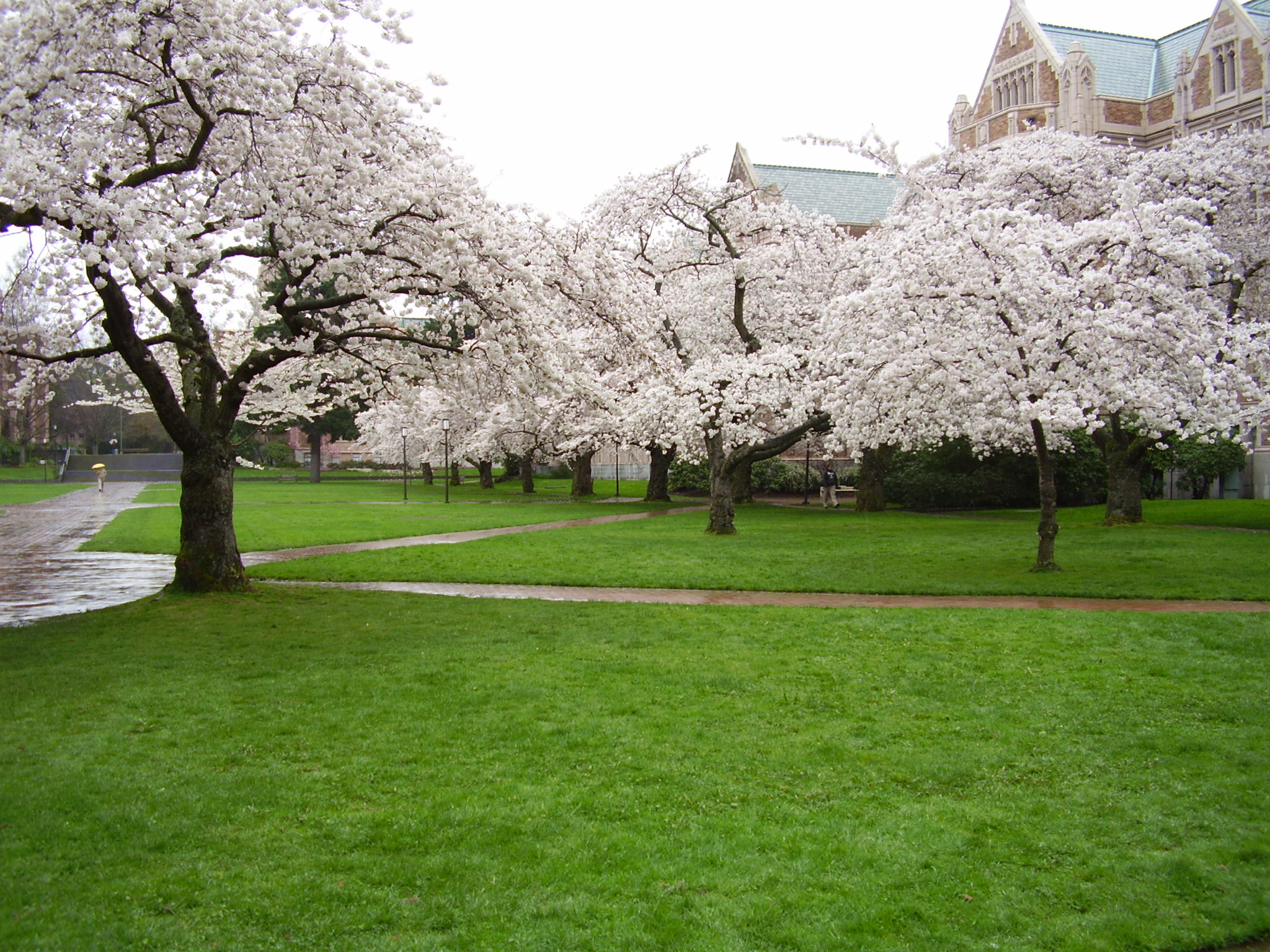

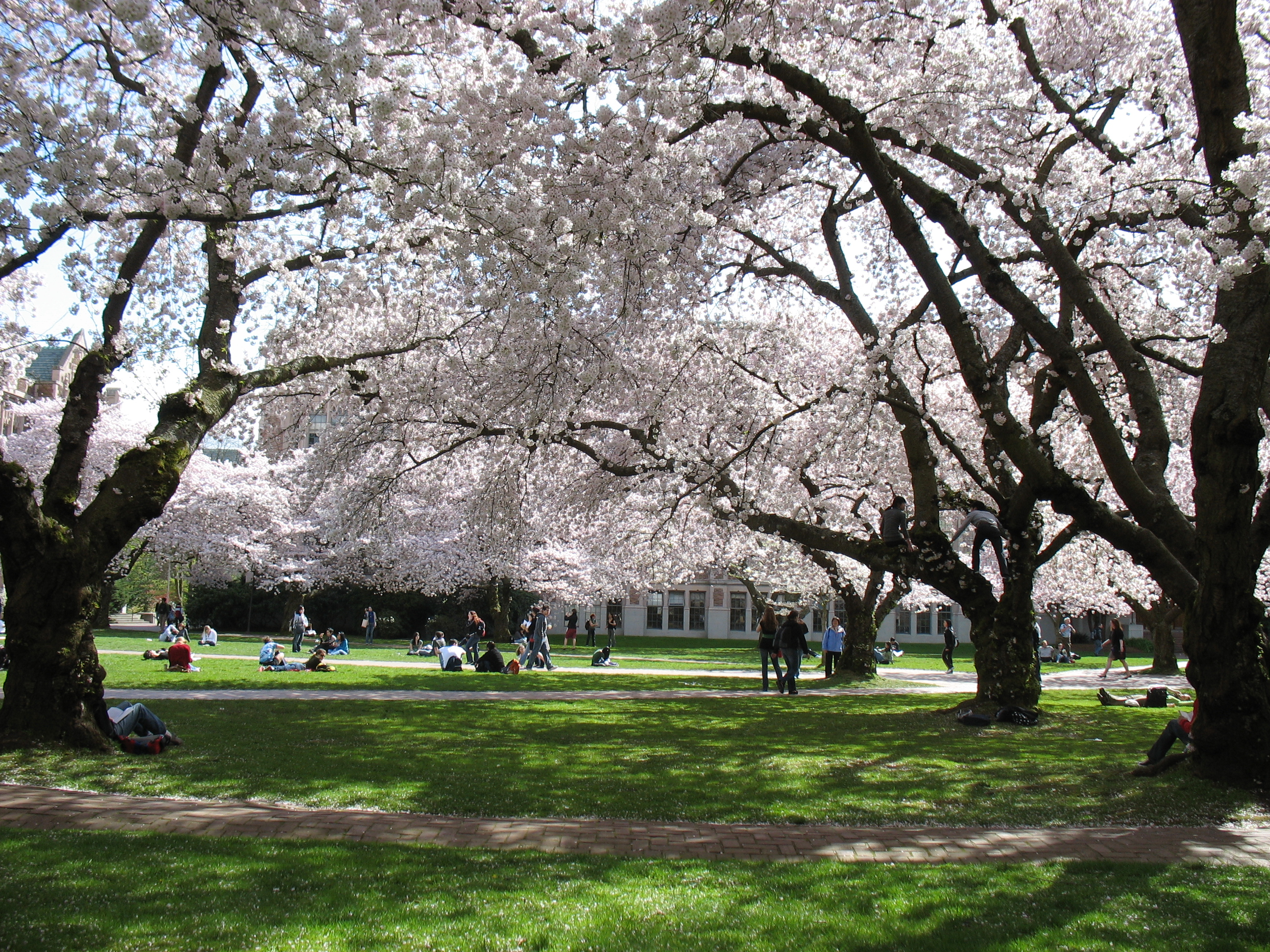

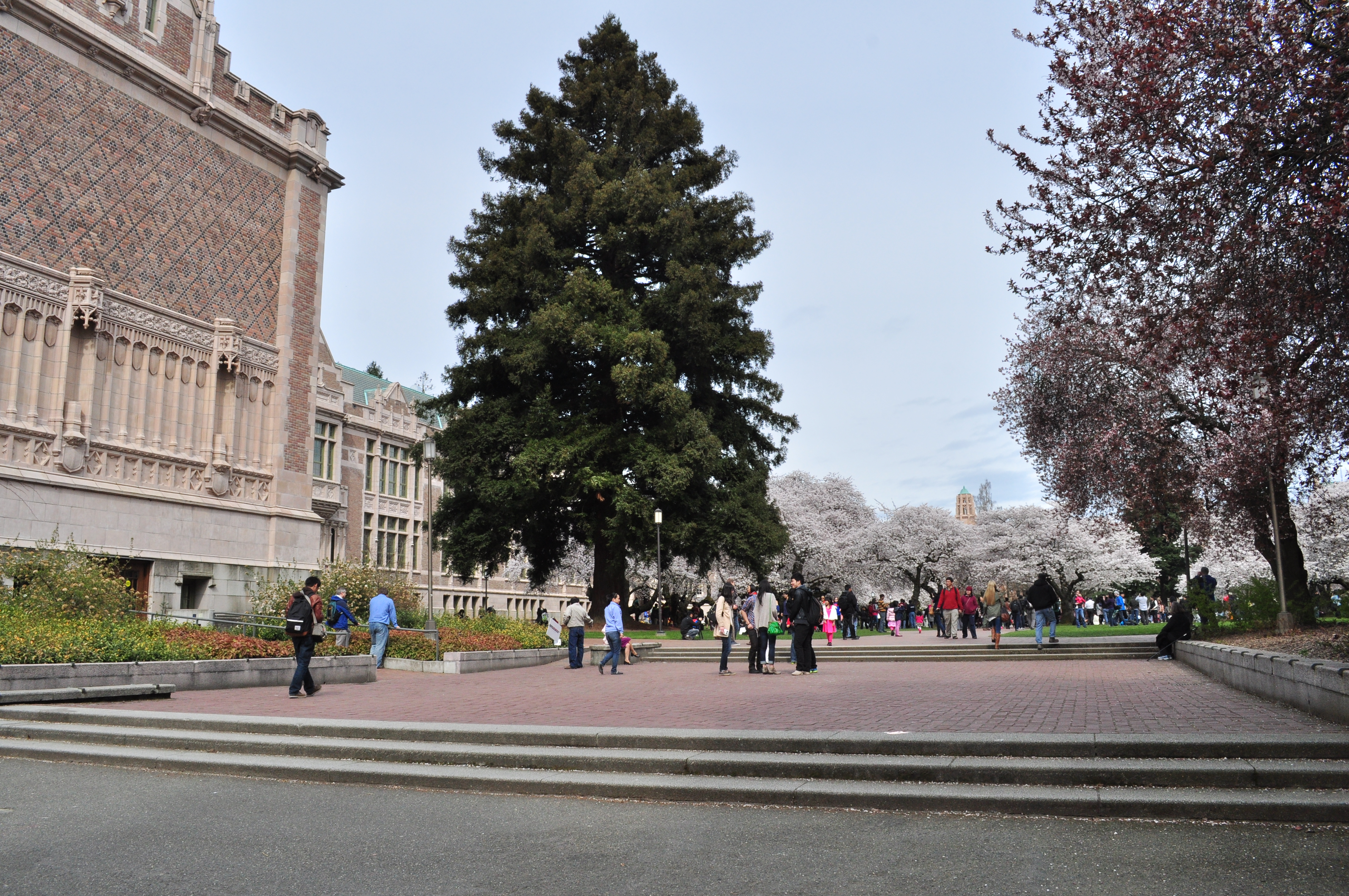

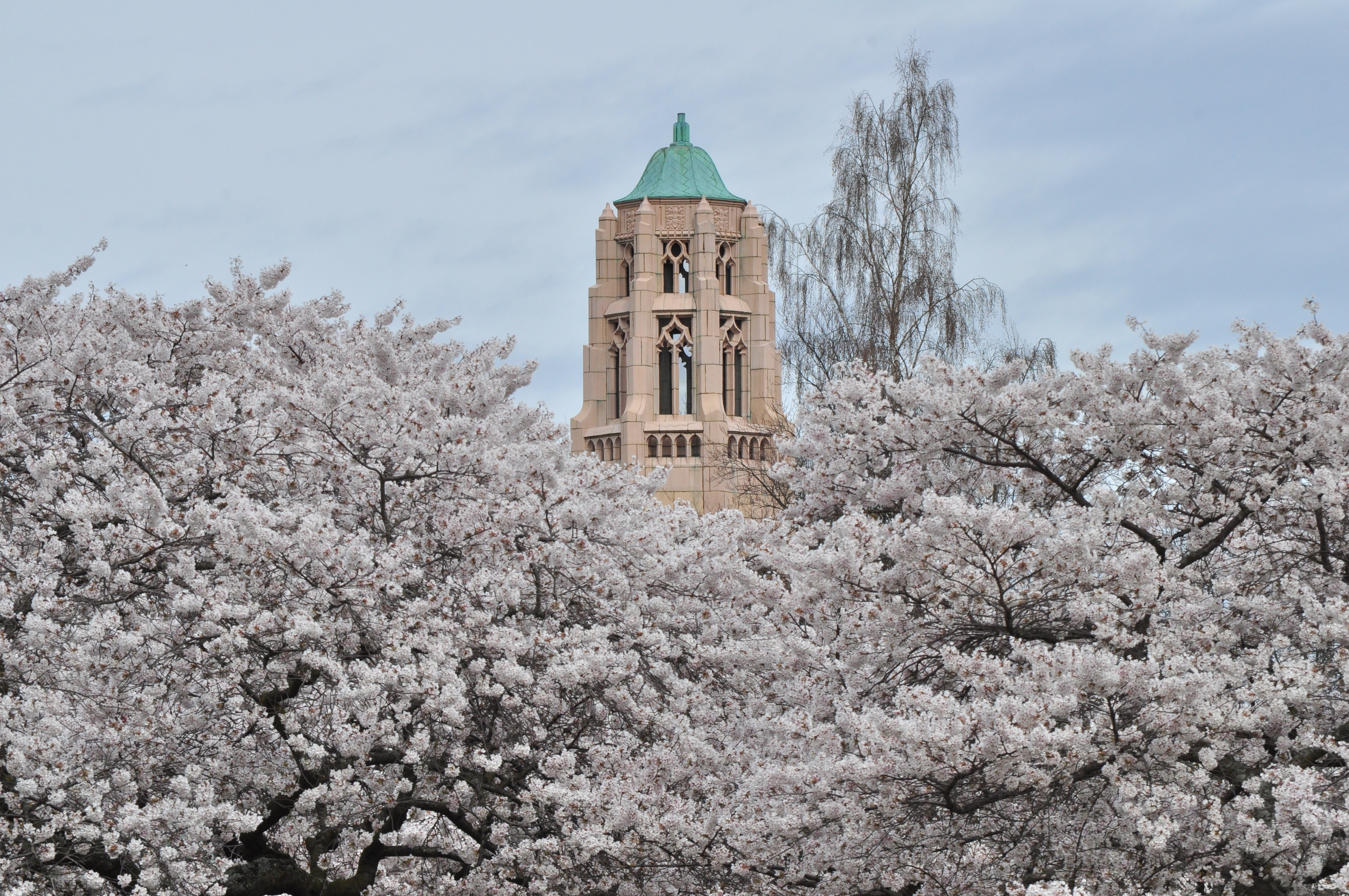

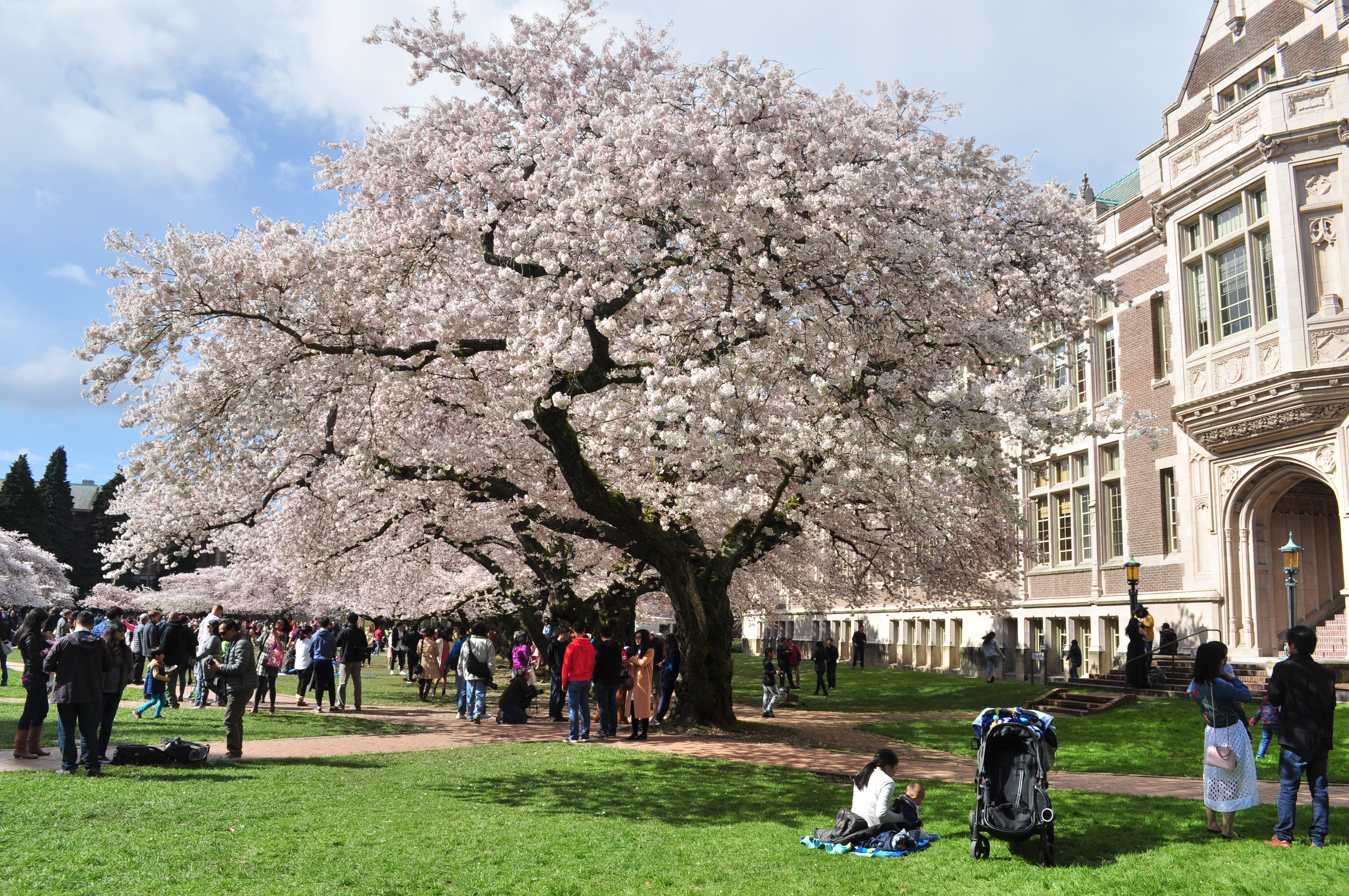

47°39′26″N 122°18′26″W
