= Mutiny Bay =

Coordinates: 47.99428°N 122.55802°W

Mutiny Bay is a bay in the U.S. state of Washington. Part of Puget Sound, Mutiny Bay is located in Island County near the southern end of Whidbey Island, northwest of Useless Bay and adjoining Admiralty Inlet.

Mutiny Bay was named by the United States Coast Survey in 1855. No explanation was given for the choice of name.

On September 4, 2022, a floatplane crashed into Mutiny Bay while operating a flight from Friday Harbor Seaplane Base to Renton Municipal Airport. There were no survivors among the 9 passengers and pilot on board.
