= Black Lens News =

Monthly African-American newspaper from Spokane Washington USA

- December 2020 issue
- Type: Monthly newspaper
- Publisher: Sandra Williams
- Founded: 2015
- Headquarters: 1312 N. Monroe Street, #148; Spokane, WA 99201
- Circulation: 700. Issues monthly (as of 2016)
- Website: blacklensnews.com

Black Lens News is a monthly African-American newspaper based in Spokane, Washington.

== History ==
The newspaper was founded in 2015 by Sandra Williams who acted as the newspaper's publisher and editor. Williams, who partly grew up in the Spokane area, remembered that the region used to have the newspaper African American Voice, which covered topics relevant to the Black community. She got the idea for creating a new newspaper for the Black community while her father was dying and came out with the first issue in January 2015. A U.S. Justice Department report noting the disproportionate use of force on African Americans in Spokane shaped her vision for the paper, and was the focus of its first lead story.

The newspaper was originally twelve pages and has expanded to 20. It contains Black news highlights from other sources both local and in the larger world as well as local sections such as its "It Takes a Village" section which highlights accomplishments of local people and a regular column "Thoughts from a Grandmother". The newspaper primarily circulates through Black churches and businesses and contains a directory of Black-owned businesses.

Williams ran the paper until she died in a floatplane crash near Whidbey Island on September 4, 2022. She was 60. The paper went on hiatus until relaunching in February 2024 with a new website. Williams’s family, several foundations, local businesses and some journalists from The Spokesman-Review created a non-profit to run the paper following the founder's death. And Gonzaga University has plans to provide office space.
