= Killing of Jaahnavi Kandula =

2023 death caused by car collision in Seattle, United States

The killing of Jaahnavi Kandula (1999 – January 23, 2023) occurred in Seattle, Washington on January 23, 2023, when Seattle Police Department officer Kevin Dave hit her with his police vehicle as she crossed the street in a marked crosswalk. Kandula was a graduate student from India at Northeastern University's Seattle campus preparing to graduate with a master's in Information Systems in December 2023. Dave was driving 74 miles per hour (119 km/h) without a continuous siren while responding to a drug overdose call. The street had a normal speed limit of 25 miles per hour (40 km/h). Kandula died after the collision threw her 138 feet (42 m).

On September 11, 2023, the Police Department released body camera footage of Seattle Police Department officer Daniel Auderer—the vice president of the Seattle Police Officers Guild—laughing and making jokes about the situation shortly after evaluating Dave for potential impairment during the fatal collision. Auderer was on a phone call with police union president Mike Solan, and he said that Kandula had "limited value" so the city should "just write a check [for] $11,000". The footage was forwarded to the Seattle Office of Police Accountability and an investigation into Auderer's conduct was opened; Leesa Manion, the King County Prosecuting Attorney, also announced a criminal review of Dave's actions. The released footage prompted condemnation and the Consulate General of India in San Francisco stated that the footage was "deeply troubling" and called for an investigation.

On September 13, 2023, Seattle Mayor Bruce Harrell released a condolence letter written to Kandula's family. By September 29, Auderer had been suspended from patrol duty, but was "administratively reassigned to a non-operational position" according to the Seattle Police Department.

On February 21, 2024, the King County Prosecutor's Office decided against filing criminal charges against Dave. Manion stated that the criminal review did not turn up enough evidence to prove beyond a reasonable doubt that Dave had acted with recklessness or criminal negligence, as required under Washington State law. The decision drew widespread criticism from communities in India and the US. The Kandula family declared their intent to pursue civil actions against Dave and the Seattle Police Department. On July 17, Auderer was announced as having been fired.

In December of 2024, Dave reached an agreement with The King County Prosecutor's Office to pay a $5000 fine.

On January 6, 2025, Dave was fired from the Seattle Police Department by Interim Police Chief Sue Rahr in an internal announcement to the department. In February 2026, a settlement of $29 million was reached with Kandula's family.
