= Project Gesundheit =

Medical Initiative by Amazon.com

Project Gesundheit is an initiative by Amazon.com to find a cure for the common cold. (Note: The common cold may be caused by a human coronavirus.) The initiative is reported to be directed from Amazon Web Services' Grand Challenge research and development group. Grand Challenge, also known as 1492 and Amazon X, was founded in 2014 and was reported by CNBC to be staffed by "former Google X engineers and founders of various health start-ups".
