= Decker children murders =

2025 mass murder in Washington (state)

Murders of the Decker children
- Location: Washington, U.S.
- Date: Disappearance: May 30, 2025; Discovery of bodies: June 2, 2025
- Attack type: Mass murder, child murder
- Deaths: 4 (including the perpetrator)
- Perpetrator: Travis Caleb Decker
- Motive: Unknown

On May 30, 2025, sisters Paityn, Evelyn and Olivia Decker (ages 9, 8, and 5 respectively) were reported missing in Wenatchee, Washington, United States, after their father did not return them on time from a custody visit. Three days later, their bodies were discovered in Chelan County, near the unoccupied and abandoned truck he lived in. The father, 32-year-old Travis Caleb Decker of Pewaukee, Wisconsin, who lived in Wenatchee at the time of the murders, was the main suspect and became the focus of a three-month nationwide manhunt, the largest in the county's history. On September 25, human remains found a week prior near Leavenworth, Washington, were confirmed to be Decker's; the confirmation came a day after he was declared dead by the U.S. Marshals Service.

== Background ==
Travis Caleb Decker (born August 15, 1992) was raised in the Milwaukee suburb of Pewaukee, in Waukesha County, Wisconsin, where he graduated from Pewaukee High School in 2010. During his high school years, Decker played JV and varsity football, and was a member of the Pewaukee wrestling team who wrestled in the Wisconsin state finals later that same year.

According to authorities, in his later years, Decker served as a Green Beret and as a member of the Army National Guard, and served as an infantryman in the U.S. Army from March 2013 until July 2021, including a four-month deployment to Afghanistan in 2014. From 2014 to 2016, Decker served in the Washington National Guard as an automatic rifleman with the 75th Ranger Regiment at Joint Base Lewis-McChord. According to the Washington Military Department, Decker possessed special skills and training from his military experience, which were feared to potentially make him difficult to locate during the manhunt. During his time in the army, he was part of the 503rd Infantry Regiment and the 173rd Airborne Brigade Combat Team while stationed in Italy in 2017. Before joining the 503rd, Decker reportedly had been removed from the elite Ranger Regiment after failing to complete Ranger School.

In Pewaukee, where Decker was raised, Milwaukee Fox affiliate WITI-TV spoke to his brother TJ by phone, who stated that he had had a falling out with Decker a decade prior and the two hadn't spoken since. Decker's former neighbor in Pewaukee described Decker in an interview with NBC affiliate WTMJ-TV as "extremely athletic" and a kind teenager who excelled at sports, alongside his grandfather who was in the special forces, and that he followed in his father's footsteps by joining the military.

Decker had been married to his ex-wife, the mother of the three children, for 10 years before they divorced in 2023. His ex-wife's attorney stated that while Decker did have mental health issues, there had been no warning signs with him, and that he and his ex-wife "were able to communicate on a regular basis, not just as co-parents, but as friends." The attorney also stated that the ex-wife emphasized that Decker was an "active dad," with no previous history of violence to either her or their children.

== Disappearance and murders ==
On May 30, 2025, Decker picked his three daughters up from his ex-wife at 5pm for a planned visitation. Without explanation, he failed to return them at 8pm as planned. On June 2, law enforcement in Chelan County discovered the unoccupied white 2017 GMC Sierra truck, in which Decker had lived, near the Rock Island Campground. The bodies of the three girls were nearby. They were found zip-tied, with plastic bags over their heads. A preliminary examination concluded that they had likely been killed by asphyxiation. Decker's wallet was located in the truck, which also had a bloody handprint on its tailgate.

== Manhunt ==
After the discovery of the girls' bodies, a manhunt for Decker began. The Washington State Patrol was criticized for not initially issuing an Amber alert, despite having been asked by the Wenatchee Police to do so.

A deputy U.S. Marshal with the Pacific Northwest Violent Offender Task Force revealed in a U.S. Marshals Service affidavit that days before the murders, Decker's Google account included searches such as "how does a person move to Canada," "how to relocate to Canada," and "jobs in Canada," raising concern that Decker had been planning to flee to Canada. According to the Chelan County Sheriff's office, Decker was well-versed in outdoor survival and had previously lived off-grid for up to almost three months, but had struggled to maintain stability in his life and housing. Decker was homeless, living at campgrounds and motels.

On July 5, several law enforcement agencies began searching Idaho's Sawtooth National Forest for Decker after law enforcement officials received a tip from a family that he may have been in the area. On July 9, members of the U.S. Marshals Service Greater Idaho Fugitive Task Force located a hiker who matched Decker's general appearance and was initially suspected to be him. Later that day, the manhunt in Idaho was called off after it was confirmed that the hiker was not Decker.

On August 28, investigators discovered bones in Chelan County during the search for Decker. Authorities conducted forensic analysis to determine whether the bones were human. On September 3, they were verified to be animal bones, unrelated to the case.

=== Discovery of Decker's remains ===
On September 18, about three and a half months after Decker disappeared, human remains were found south of Leavenworth, Washington. Six days later, the U.S. Marshals Service officially declared him deceased, and DNA analysis the following day confirmed the remains belonged to Decker. On September 26, the Chelan County coroner announced that due to the advanced state of decomposition of the remains, an autopsy to determine the time and manner of Decker's death would be impossible.

== See also ==
- List of solved missing person cases (2020s)
- List of fugitives from justice who disappeared
