= Berleezy =

American YouTuber and streamer (born 1992)

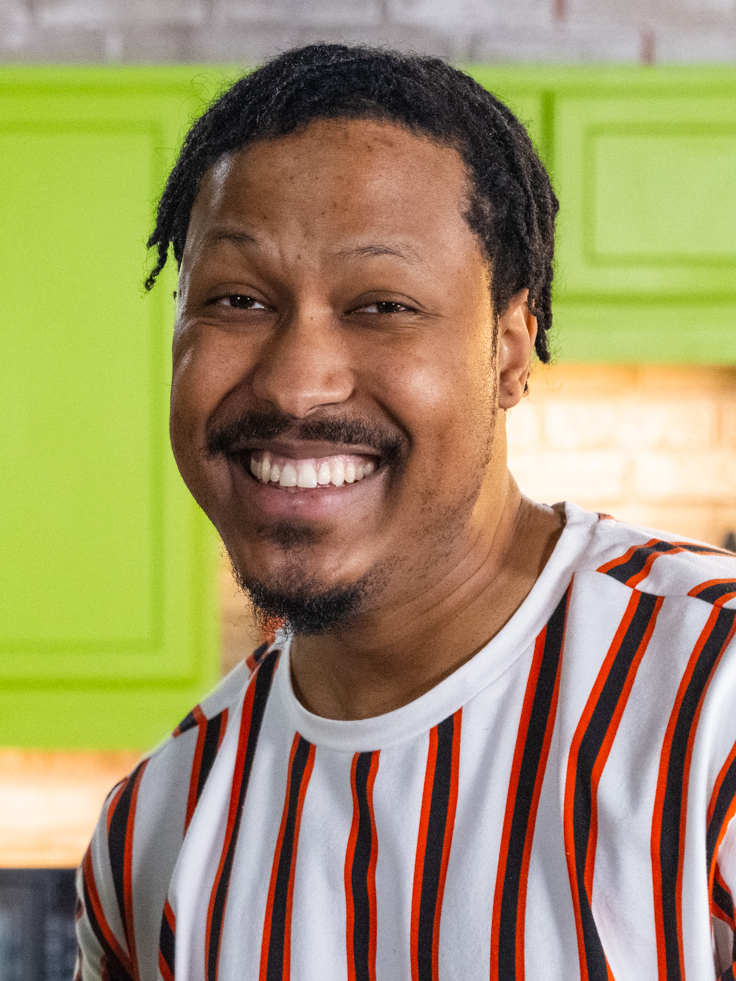
- Berleezy in 2023
- Born: Berlin Edmond Jr. December 16, 1992 (age 33)
- Education: California State University, Fullerton (BA)
- Occupations: YouTuber; streamer

YouTube information
- Channels: berleezy; Berlin; eezyTV
- Years active: 2013–present
- Genres: Gaming; comedy; commentary
- Subscribers: 2.92 million (main channel); 5 million (combined) (Note: Subscribers, broken down by channel: 2.92 million (Berleezy) 1.99 million (Berlin) 442 thousand (eezyTV))
- Views: 986 million (main channel); 1 billion (combined) (Note: Views, broken down by channel: 986 million (Berleezy) 164 million (Berlin) 52.4 million (eezyTV))
- Last updated: June 19, 2026

Berlin Edmond Jr. (born December 16, 1992), known online as Berleezy (stylized in all lowercase), is an American YouTuber. His YouTube channel first became popular in 2015 as a result of his Exposed series and later became focused on gaming content. In 2026, he won an NAACP Image Award.

== Life and career ==
Berlin Edmond Jr. was born on December 16, 1992. He has an older sister, Britani, who is also a YouTuber. He created his YouTube channel in 2013. While attending California State University, Fullerton (CSUF), where he majored in English and was the president of the school's Black Student Union, Berleezy found success on YouTube with Exposed, a series of videos in which he jokingly critiqued intros to children's television series, after his tweet of a clip of him roasting the Hey Arnold! intro went viral in 2015. He soon graduated from CSUF and, in 2017, his channel reached one million subscribers.

Berleezy created a gaming YouTube channel in 2016 and later became a popular video game streamer on Twitch, primarily streaming horror games. Tennis player Naomi Osaka debuted her Fortnite outfit in a Twitch stream with Berleezy in 2022. In the summer of 2022, Berleezy participated in a gaming livestream series hosted by State Farm called the Gamerhood, which featured multiple gaming content creators, such as Ninja. He also participated in the second season a year later.

In early February 2023, Berleezy's channel was briefly terminated, which fans believed to be in response to his gameplay video of the video game Poop Killer 4. He had a voice acting role in two games in the Fears to Fathom horror game series—Carson House (2023) and Woodbury Getaway (2024)—as Jeffery, the host of a surreal animated cooking show.

By September 2024, he had more than two and a half million subscribers. He won the inaugural NAACP Image Award for Outstanding Digital Content Creator – Gaming/Tech in February 2026. As of 2026, he hosts The Speakeezy podcast alongside Joe Iaco and PeeGTV.

== Public image ==
For Mashable, Shannon Connellan described Berleezy as "one of the most influential YouTubers out there" in 2026, whose "online empire continues to grow". His fanbase is known as the Eezy Gang; he has released merchandise featuring the name and hosted the Eezy Ball, a series of live fan events. An audio clip from a 2019 gameplay video of Corpse Party, in which he says, "That's some bullshit," went viral on TikTok in February 2021 due to its use in videos about the Texas winter storm at the time.
