= Fire lookout =

Person responsible for spotting fires

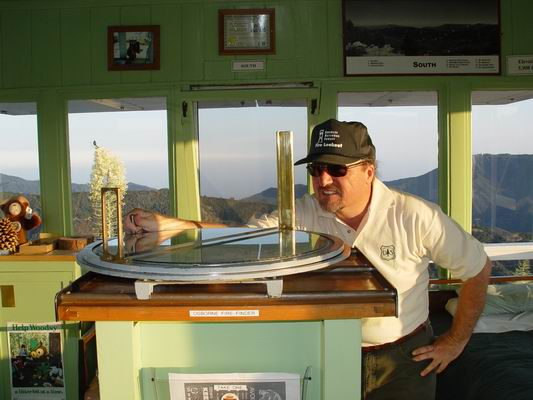
USFS fire lookout on duty at Vetter Mountain, California.

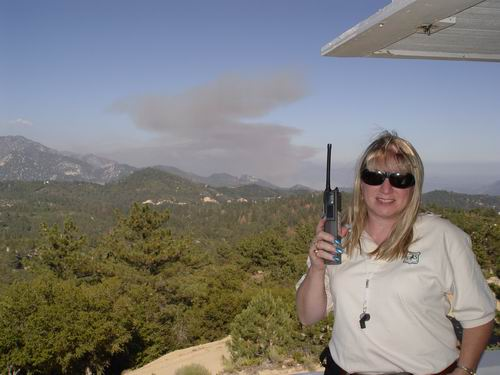
Reporting smoke is a fire lookout's primary duty in the wilderness.

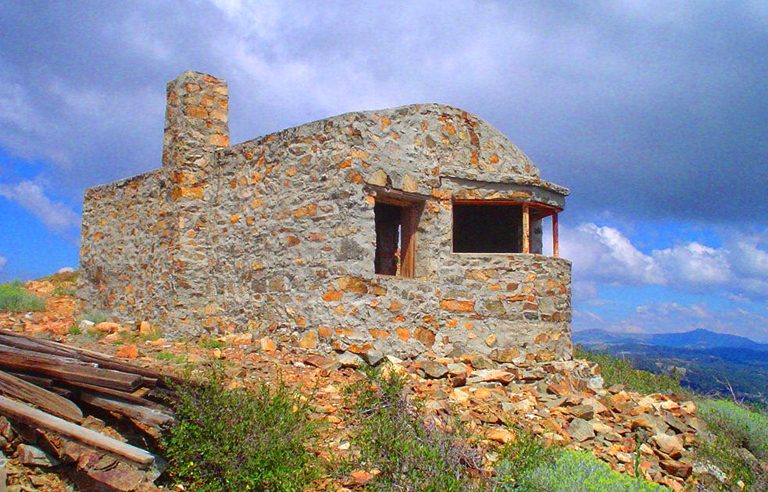
SPRR fire lookout station built in 1909 on Red Mountain above Cisco, CA (abandoned 1934)

A fire lookout (sometimes also called a fire watcher or lookout observer) is a person assigned the duty to look for fire from atop a building known as a fire lookout tower. These towers are used in remote areas, normally on mountain tops with high elevation and a good view of the surrounding terrain, to spot smoke caused by a wildfire. Alpine lookouts generally live and work in the same space, while Boreal lookouts often have a separate tower structure to work from, while living in a cabin below.

Once a possible fire is spotted, "Smoke Reports" or "Lookout Shots" are relayed to the local Emergency Communications Center (ECC), often by radio or phone. A fire lookout can use a device known as an Osborne Fire Finder to obtain the radial in degrees off the tower, and the estimated distance from the tower to the fire. Each tower covers an "Area of Responsibility," which is a circle with a radius of 40 km where they must detect and report smokes.

Part of the lookout's duties include taking weather readings and reporting the findings to the Emergency Communications Center throughout the day. Often several lookouts will overlap in coverage areas and each will "cross" the same smoke sighting location, allowing the ECC to use triangulation from the radials to achieve an accurate location of the fire. Lookout observers may collaborate with researchers as their remote sites and time spent observing can provide valuable data related to wildlife populations, wildfire behavior, and forest health.

Once ground crews and fire suppression aircraft are active in fire suppression, the lookout personnel continue to search for new smoke plumes which may indicate spotting and alterations that pose risks to ground crews. They may also provide information about changing fire behavior or incoming weather (such as storm cells or poor visibility) that may impact fire suppression efforts.

Working in a fire lookout tower in the middle of a wilderness area takes a hardy type of person, one who can work with no supervision, and is able to survive without any other human interaction. Some towers are accessible by automobile, but others are so remote a lookout must hike in, or be lifted in by helicopter. In many locations, even modern fire lookout towers do not have electricity or running water. Individuals who work as lookouts often bring pets along to keep them company. Many lookouts are creatives, and hobbies are essential to combat the inevitable boredom lookouts will face. Common lookout hobbies include reading, learning instruments, writing, and creating art, which is often inspired by their work and environment.

Most fire lookout jobs are seasonal through the fire season. Fire lookouts can be paid staff or volunteer staff. Some volunteer organizations in the United States have started to rebuild, restore and operate aging fire lookout towers.

Women have been doing the job almost from its beginnings.

== Countries/regions that use fire lookouts ==
- United States
- Canada (B.C., Alberta, Saskatchewan, Manitoba, Ontario, Nova Scotia)
- Mexico
- Uruguay
- Brazil
- Greece
- Australia
- New Zealand
- Hong Kong
- Indonesia
- France
- Italy
- Portugal
- Cyprus
- Spain
- Germany
- Latvia
- Lithuania
- United Kingdom – during World War II (termed 'Fire Watchers') as part of Air Raid Precautions system.
- Israel
- Russia
- Kazakhstan
- South Africa
- Poland
- Norway

== Notable fire lookouts ==
- William Hilton II – the first forest fire lookout in the U.S.
- Hallie Morse Daggett – the first female fire lookout for the U.S. Forest Service
- Helen Dowe – Devil's Head Lookout at Pike National Forest (1918)
- Ramona Merwin and family – Vetter Mountain, raised her family in the lookout
- Howard "Razz" Gardner and Keith V. Johnson – spotted "The Lookout Air Raid", a little-known Japanese aircraft attack on Oregon, USA during World War II
- Roy Sullivan – worked as a fire lookout in his early career as a U.S. National Park Ranger, but was best known for having set a world record for surviving seven lightning strikes during his life
- Jack Kerouac – wrote the books The Dharma Bums, Desolation Angels and Lonesome Traveler, which include accounts of his job as a fire lookout on Desolation Peak in the North Cascades during the summer of 1956
- Edward Abbey – was a fire lookout at Mt. Harkness (1966; Lassen National Park), Atacosa (1968; Coronado National Forest), North Rim (1969–1971; Grand Canyon National Park), Numa Ridge (1975; Glacier National Park), and Aztec Peak (1977–1979; Tonto National Forest)
- Doug Peacock – was a fire lookout at Huckleberry and Scalplock in Glacier National Park from 1976 to 1984
- Gary Snyder – was a fire lookout at Crater Peak and Sourdough Mountain in the North Cascades
- Philip Whalen – was a fire lookout on Sourdough Mountain and Sauk Mountain in the North Cascades
- Norman Maclean – chronicled his experience in "USFS 1919: The Ranger, the Cook, and a Hole in the Sky"
- Philip Connors – writer
- Thomas William Ah Chow – a Chinese-Australian who lived in the remote Moscow Villa in the 1940s
- Ferdinand Martinů – father of the Czech composer Bohuslav Martinů, worked as the church sexton and town fire watchman in the tower of the St. Jakub Church in Polička, Bohemia. Furthermore, Bohuslav Martinů was born in said tower.
- Margaret Thatcher – worked as a fire lookout in Grantham during the Second World War
- Morten Lauridsen – composer, worked as a fire fighter and lookout in Washington State
- Stephanie Stewart - experienced fire lookout in Alberta who disappeared. Her case remains unsolved but RCMP determined it was likely a homicide, this led to significant safety improvements to the Alberta lookout program.

== In popular culture ==
The 2016 video game Firewatch follows the story of a fire lookout in Shoshone National Forest after the Yellowstone fires of 1988.

The opening section of Desolation Angels, a semi-autobiographical novel by Jack Kerouac published in 1965, is taken almost directly from the journal Kerouac kept when he was a fire lookout on Desolation Peak in the North Cascade mountains of Washington state.

The video game Fears to Fathom: Ironbark Lookout follows the story of a fire lookout at the fictional Ironbark State Park.

The 2021 book "Lookout: Love, Solitude, and Searching for Wildfires in the Boreal Forest" by author Trina Moyles explores her experiences working as a fire lookout in Alberta, Canada

The Smoke Diaries Podcast was a podcast created by lookouts in Alberta, Canada, allowing lookouts from across the province to share their music, poetry, and stories of lookout life

== See also ==
- Lookout tree
- List of fire lookout towers
