= William Hilton II =

American conversationist and business executive from Maine

- Born: January 13, 1886; Chesuncook, Maine, U.S.
- Died: February 13, 1964 (aged 78); Bangor, Maine, U.S.
- Burial place: Mount Hope Cemetery, Bangor, Maine, U.S.
- Education: University of Maine (B.S.)
- Occupations: forest fire lookout; engineer; businessman
- Years active: 1905–1960
- Known for: First American forest fire lookout
- Title: Vice President of Great Northern Paper Company Woodland Department; Director of Great Northern Paper Company
- Spouse: Florence Rogers (m. 1910)
- Children: 4; including Thomas L. Hilton
- Parents: Leonard Hilton (father); Adeline Foss (mother)

William Hilton II (January 13, 1886 – February 13, 1964) was an American business executive and engineer who worked as the Vice President of the Maine-based Great Northern Paper Company from 1929 to 1957, and then as the company's Director from 1957 until his retirement on January 1, 1960. He is also known as one of the first forest fire lookouts in the United States.

== Early life and education ==
William Hilton II was born on January 13, 1886, in Chesuncook Village, Maine, to Leonard and Adeline (née Foss) Hilton. Leonard Hilton served as a Maine fish and game warden for Piscataquis County. At the time of Hilton's birth, fewer than 60 people lived in the village. Hilton lived a few years of his life in Chesuncook Village before his family moved to Greenville, Maine, nearly 60 miles away, so Hilton could attend primary school. Hilton lived in Greenville until he began attending the University of Maine.

=== Fire lookout ===
On June 10, 1905, the first forest fire lookout tower in the United States began operation at the summit of Big Squaw Mountain (now Big Moose Mountain) near Greenville, with William Hilton as the watchman. His entry of "Commenced work Saturday, June 10, 1905; clear, South wind," is cited as the first entry made by a forest fire lookout in the United States. Hilton summited the mountain every morning to perform his duties. Due to technical limitations, Hilton had to run down the mountain to a logging camp if he spotted a fire in order to call the chief fire warden. Hilton held this position until 1908, when he left for school.

Hilton attended the University of Maine from 1908 until 1911, when he graduated with a Bachelor of Science (B.S.) in Civil Engineering.

== Career ==
On August 1, 1912, one year after graduation from the University of Maine, Hilton began work at the Great Northern Paper Company, also known as Great Northern. Hilton worked as a forestry engineer at various levels for Great Northern for almost two decades, including as the assistant superintendent of the forestry division beginning in 1916, and as superintendent of the same division beginning in 1917.

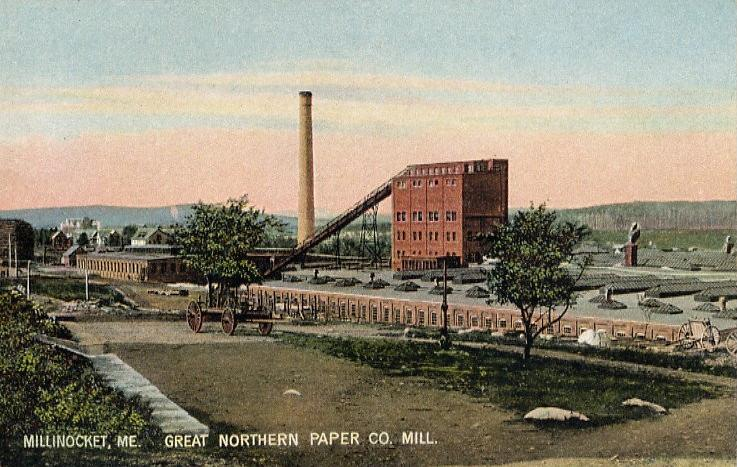
The main mill of the Great Northern Paper Company in Millinocket, Maine

In 1927, Hilton became Assistant Manager of Great Northern's Woodland Department. In 1929, Hilton was elected and succeeded the second vice president, "Baron" Fred Gilbert, to become the third vice president of Great Northern's forestry operations. As Vice President, Hilton represented the company in a lawsuit (Michalka v. Great Northern Paper Co., 151 Me. 98 (1955)) that reached the Maine Supreme Judicial Court, where the plaintiff alleged Great Northern negligently released water from Ripogenus Dam in Piscataquis County, Maine, and caused widespread property damage to his farm. The lawsuit resulted with no fault found from Great Northern.

In 1957, Hilton was elected Director of Great Northern by the company's board, a title he held concurrently as Vice President. Following various forest fires in lands managed by Great Northern, Hilton instituted a company policy that any pulpwood cutters recruited to Great Northern not only agreed to cut pulp but also fight any forest fires on company property.

On Christmas Day, 1959, Hilton announced that he would retire from his role as Vice President and Director at Great Northern on January 1, 1960. He worked for Great Northern for 47 years and helped facilitate the company's acquisition of over 750,000 acres of forested land in Northern Maine over his career. Hilton also took part in the first land negotiations with former Maine Governor Percival Baxter that ultimately created Baxter State Park.

== Personal life ==
For Hilton's entire life, he was a proponent of wilderness conservation efforts, and served on the Committee of Timberland Owners, who advise the Maine Forest Commissioner.

When the United States entered World War II in 1942, Hilton was appointed to serve on the pulpwood section of the United States War Production Board.

Throughout his career, Hilton served on the board of trustees of various institutions, including Eastern Maine General Hospital (now called Northern Light Eastern Maine Medical Center) and American Forest Products Industries. Hilton also served as Director of various institutions and organizations, including the American Pulpwood Association, Merrill Trust Company, Northern National Bank of Presque-Isle, and the University of Maine Pulp and Paper Foundation Scholarship Committee.

Hilton served in local government as a city councilman and alderman in Bangor, Maine, his hometown.

William Hilton married Florence Rogers, a native of Greenville, Maine, c. 1910. Hilton and Rogers had two daughters, Marie Klausmier and Jane Mealey, as well as two sons, William Hilton III and Dr. Thomas L. Hilton. Hilton's latter son was an author and researcher who worked for the Educational Testing Service (ETS) for over 30 years and helped develop what would become the SAT, as well as other college and university entrance exams. Hilton III worked for MIT, Harvard University, and Carnegie Mellon, among other schools, before he also began his career at ETS.

== Death and legacy ==
=== Tower commemoration ===
On July 26, 1958, a field day was held atop Big Squaw Mountain in honor of William Hilton. Hilton was actively serving as both Director and Vice President of Great Northern at the time, and various business executives were invited to attend. Also in attendance were Richard E. McArdle, eighth Chief of the United States Forest Service, and Maine Forest Commissioner A.D. Nutting. Hilton received a certificate celebrating his "pioneering in forest fire control", followed by a celebratory radio signal transmitted from the tower on Big Squaw. To end the ceremony, a bronze plaque planted in a large stone was erected nearby the fire lookout tower on Big Squaw.

=== William Hilton and O.A. Harkness ===
Beginning in the mid-20th century, Great Northern acquired and began construction on various small steam boats to use on inland rivers and lakes. These boats were intended to lower the cost of the increasingly-unpopular Penobscot River log drives.

Constructed in East Boothbay, Maine, in 1961, the William Hilton, and her younger sister ship, the O.A. Harkness, were inland water tugboats intended not to pull larger ships, but instead haul logs from northern lakes, to the Penobscot River, and to the mills in Millinocket and surrounding towns. These ships, manned by a crew of half a dozen men, eliminated much of the manual labor involved in traditional log drives. William Hilton II was the namesake for the William Hilton, while O.A. Harkness was named after the former Great Northern superintendent of motorized equipment, Orris Albert Harkness. The Hilton operated mainly on Chesuncook Lake, while the Harkness operated on the Pemadumcook Chain of Lakes, which includes the Ambajejus, Elbow, Pemadumcook, North Twin, and South Twin Lakes.

Hilton and Harkness were sold following the passage of the 1972 Clean Water Act, which effectively ended all log drives in the United States. Hilton has been renamed by various owners, and as of 1993, its current whereabouts and ownership are unknown.

=== Death ===
In the early morning of Thursday, February 13, 1964, Hilton died unexpectedly in his sleep at his home in Bangor, Maine. He was buried two days later on February 15, at Mount Hope Cemeterey in Bangor next to his wife, Florence, who died in 1956.
