= Hallie Morse Daggett =

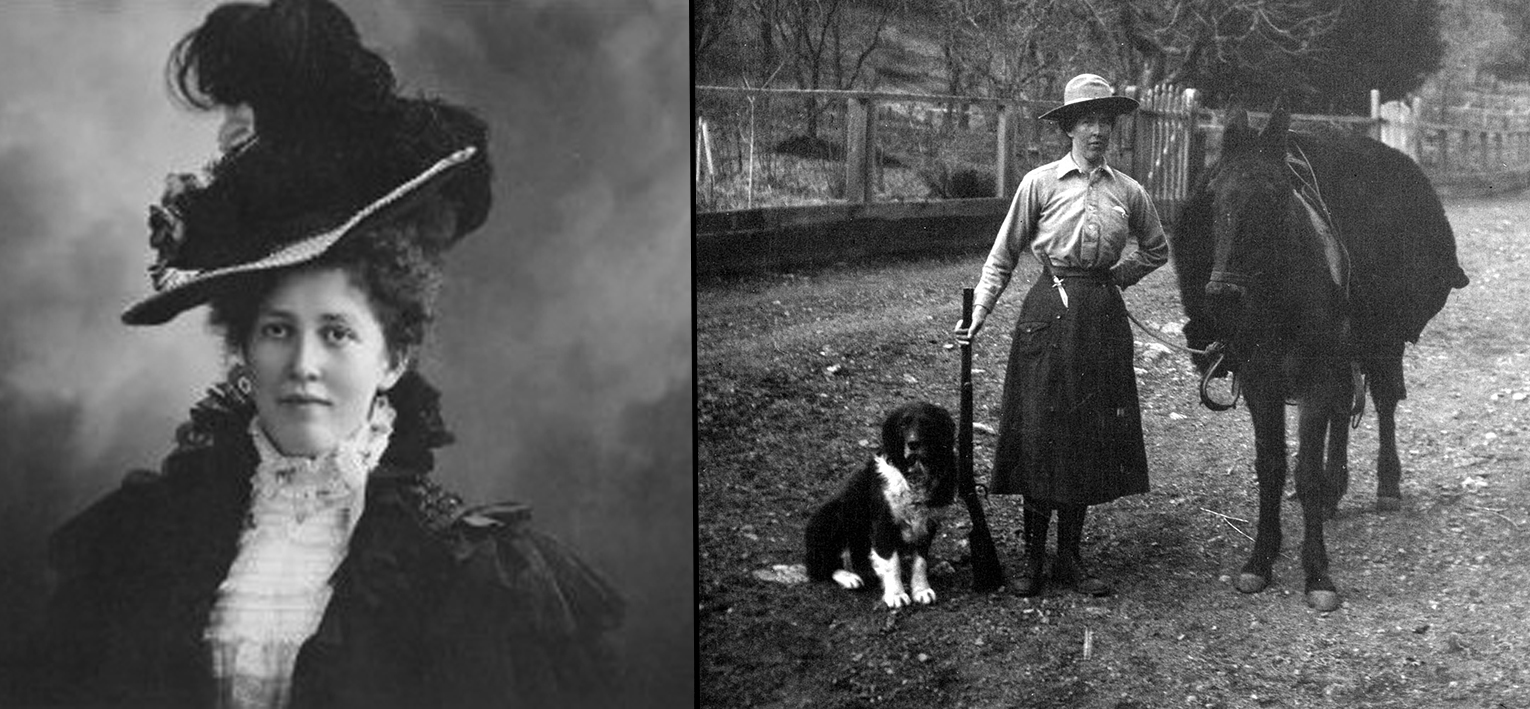
Hallie Morse Daggett was the first woman fire lookout employed by the US Forest Service. She began in the remote Klamath National Forest, California in 1913 and served for fifteen years. Photo courtesy of the Forest History Society, Durham, N.C.

Hallie Morse Daggett (December 19, 1878 – October 19, 1964) was the first woman hired as a fire lookout by the United States Forest Service.

Daggett worked at Eddy's Gulch Lookout Station at the top of Klamath Peak on the Klamath National Forest in northern California beginning in the summer of 1913. The Eddy Gulch Lookout Station stood on an isolated mountain, at an elevation of 6,444 feet, and a 3 hours hard climb from the base. Daggett worked alone at this lookout for fifteen summers.
