= Fears to Fathom =

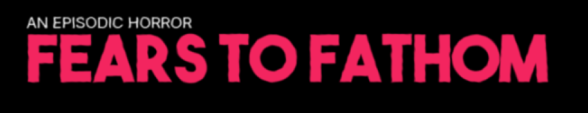
- Genres: Anthology; Horror
- Developer: Mukul Negi
- Publisher: RayllStudios
- Composer: Nathan Hall
- Platforms: Windows; PlayStation 5
- First release: Fears to Fathom: Home Alone; 2 July 2021
- Latest release: Fears to Fathom [Together]: Scratch Creek; 10 June, 2026
- Spin-offs: Fears to Fathom [Together]

Fears to Fathom is a horror franchise centered on a series of episodic anthology-style psychological horror video games featuring allegedly real stories submitted by players of the game. The series is created and published by Indian game developer Mukul Negi, who goes by Rayll on online profiles.

There were five single-player episodes released between 2021 and 2024. The first episode, Home Alone, was released for free on Steam, with later episodes costing around $5-10. The fourth episode, Ironbark Lookout, was released on PlayStation in October 2024 as well.

There are currently co-op episodes being released under Fears to Fathom [Together], with the first co-op episode, Scratch Creek, being released in June 2026.

== Episodes ==
Release timeline
2021	Fears to Fathom: Home Alone
2022	Fears to Fathom: Norwood Hitchhike
2023	Fears to Fathom: Carson House
2023	Fears to Fathom: Ironbark Lookout
2024	Fears to Fathom: Woodbury Getaway
2025
2026	Fears to Fathom: Scratch Creek

=== Main series ===
The main Fears to Fathom series consists of five episodes containing stories submitted by players of the game. As the episodes go on they get progressively longer and larger in scale, with the first episode's playtime being twenty minutes and the fifth episode's playtime being two hours.

The first episode, titled Home Alone, was released on 2 July, 2021, and the final episode, titled Woodbury Getaway, was released on 12 September, 2024.

==== Home Alone (2021) ====
Miles wakes up from a nap late in the evening. Upon leaving his bedroom he walks into his parents' room and looks out the window where he spots a man looking up at the room from outside, but the man quickly turns and walks away.

Miles heats up some lasagna and eats it while watching TV. While watching the TV he sees a pair of feet at the corner of his eye ascend the stairs. Brushing it off, he does his homework and goes to bed.

At 1:16 AM Miles wakes up and goes downstairs to get a drink of water. Before going back to sleep, his mother sends him an image of a man at the front door, which had been sent by Paula, their next-door neighbor. Checking through the blinds to see if anyone is really there, he sees a man standing behind the door. Miles runs upstairs and hides under his bed as he hears a window break in his parents' room. Miles is informed by his mother that Paula is at the door, but when he is about to go downstairs the door to his parents room opens, revealing the man inside. Miles rushes back under his bed until the sound of police sirens could be heard. Miles meets Paula at the door but the fate of the man is unknown.

==== Norwood Hitchhike (2022) ====
Holly Gardner, having previously ignored her father's advice to buy a plane ticket to a gaming convention she was at, drives the long way home after realising the severity of traffic. Low on fuel, she goes to a fuel station. While she is at the station the cashier warns her of the Norwood Valley Monster, a seemingly ordinary hitchhiker who would hang her victims upside down on trees. Holly attempts to get more information from another man in the store, but he dismisses her. As Holly is about to get back in her car she spots a man walking away from her car and driving off in a white van. Holly drives for a while until her car breaks down in a completely isolated location, forcing her to hitchhike until the customer from the fuel station, who introduces himself as Jason, helps her.

Jason drops Holly off at a motel that would offer roadside assistance as well as a place for her to rest for the night. She pays for a room as well as roadside assistance. When Holly finds her room she encounters Tommy, who does room service for the motel as well as roadside assistance. Tommy prepares the room and sets out to retrieve Holly's car. As Holly is lying in bed she spots a man staring at her through the window, but he scurries away before Holly can get a proper look at him. Beginning to feel paranoid, Holly gets a coffee from the motel's coffee machine, but it turns out that the coffee was spiked, so she stumbles back to her room and into her bed.

Holly is woke up by the telephone on the nightstand ringing, and as she is waking up she hears creaking coming from the closet. Joe, the man from the reception, knocks at the door and informs Holly of several guests' complaints over being woken up by the "goofy noises" Holly made while she was under the influence of the spiked coffee. Joe questions why Holly's eyes are red, and Holly explains the incident with the coffee machine, however Joe claims that the motel doesn't have a coffee machine. Confused, Holly directs Joe to where the coffee machine was, but it's vanished. As Joe is scolding Holly, she sees the man that stared through her window earlier leaving her room; he was in the closet while she was asleep. Joe angrily orders Holly to go back to her room.

Holly tries to go back to sleep, but her paranoia is keeping her awake. As she paces a flash illuminates the room; someone took a picture of her. Moments later, she hears a man at the door pleading for her to open the door. When Holly refuses, the man starts kicking at the door, so she rushes into the closet. The man kicks the door down and begins searching the room, but before he can search the closet he is incapacitated by Joe.

Later that night Tommy arrives back to the motel with the car in tow. Joe refuses to report the incident to the police because he prioritises the motel's reputation and fears that the incident becoming public could cause harm.

==== Carson House (2023) ====
Noah Baker is assigned a job by his realtor father to housesit for Roy Carson, one of his clients. Noah agrees to watch the house for the weekend for $100. Upon arriving at the house he finds the key to the house under a fake rock in the backyard.

Shortly after entering the house Noah is assigned his first job from Roy, which is to feed Zeke, Roy's dog. After feeding Zeke, Noah is tasked with ridding Roy's computer of a multitude of viruses. Noah enters Roy's office, which has one of its doors blocked from the inside by a shelf. After removing the viruses Noah gains access to the house's security cameras.

While Noah is watching a show with his girlfriend Evelyn Cooper, he is instructed by Roy to collect groceries. Noah gets on a bicycle that belongs to Roy's son Alec and heads to Knuck's Convenience Store. While at the grocery store he bumps into his classmates, Turner and Andy. Turner tells Noah that his ex-girlfriend Cara was at the store moments earlier and bought a massive amount of beer. Noah and Andy try to dismiss it, Noah had broken up with Cara due to a falling out over her heavy drinking and drug addiction, and Noah prefers to not talk about her. Once their conversation ends Noah continues shopping and stops thinking about the conversation.

Back at the house Noah sees a car that had been parked at the Convenience Store is now across the street. He then gets a text from Andy suggesting that he look up the "Roy Carson divorce". When Noah looks it up he finds an article stating that Roy Carson's ex-wife was a former actress whose fans were coming to Roy's home and threatening him over alleged adultery. As Noah's paranoia is building the doorbell rings. Noah checks the security cameras and finds that it's a pizza delivery man, although Noah never ordered any pizza. After Noah takes the pizza Roy reveals that he ordered the pizza himself, to the relief of Noah. As Noah is eating the pizza he hears the doorbell ring again, but this time there's no answer from the other side. Noah checks the security cameras and sees that a bouquet of flowers was left at the front door. Noah then gets a message from an unknown sender asking what he had for dinner. Noah was slightly unnerved but dismissed it as a wrong number.

As he is doing study work the power suddenly cuts off. Thinking somebody is deliberately messing with him, Noah confronts the unknown sender, believing it to be Turner. Noah then promptly goes outside and switches the power back on. As Noah continues his studying he checks the cameras again and finds that the door to Roy's filming room is open and the equipment is knocked over. Noah then hears something coming from the kitchen, and on the cameras he sees that the oven is on. Now sick of Turner's tricks, Noah texts Andy and tells him to tell Turner to stop messing in the house, but Andy replies saying that Turner is at his house. Noah's worry transforms into horror as he looks at the cameras and sees Cara walking around upstairs, searching for him until she's right outside the blocked door to the office. Cara knows that Noah is in the room, because she talks to him from the outside. She demands a second chance at their relationship and threatens to kill both him and Evelyn. Noah sneaks into the laundry room across the hall before Cara reaches the door to the room and he escapes once she is out of sight.

Noah's father calls the police and she is arrested and sentenced to prison time after authorities see the camera footage of her breaking into the house and taking a knife from the kitchen.

==== Ironbark Lookout (2023) ====
Jack Nelson works as a fire lookout in Ironhorse State Park as he is in dire financial straits and needs a salary to make ends meet. One day Jack is transferred to tower 11 at Ironbark State Park, so he gets in his RV and begins his two-hour journey to the new location. During Jack's journey he stops by a small fast food restaurant recommended by his sister Kayla.

Upon Jack's arrival he meets Billy, the gate operator, who he is told by his employer, Mitch, to present his ID to. Billy hands Jack the keys to tower 11 as well as a flashlight and welcomes him to the park. After a lengthy walk Jack reaches the tower, where he watches an instructional video explaining the job: keeping watch for fires, record wind speed and temperature, keep campers out of unregistered camp grounds and take good care of the camp. After watching the video he hears the voice of another ranger talking to him through the radio. The ranger introduces himself as Connor Hawkins of tower 12, and he reminds Jack to light a fire and record the weather for the night. After recording the weather Jack goes to sleep, but he's awoken in the middle of the night by the sound of static coming from the radio, although he hears no speaking. While urinating off the balcony Jack sees someone shine a light at him before disappearing into the woods.

The following evening Connor alerts Jack to campfire smoke in an unregistered camping area. When Jack arrives to the location of the smoke he hears a man scream but he sees no one. While investigating he hears someone whistling and sees a figure looking at him from behind a tree, but it disappears before Jack can get a closer look. Jack reports the empty campsite and the scream to Connor, but he brushes it off as a conspiracy related to some kids who went missing in the area. While getting wood to light a fire for the night Jack hears the same whistling he heard at the campsite, as if he was followed back to his tower.

Jack once again wakes up in the middle of the night, still hearing the whistling. As his eyes drift open he sees the shadow of what looks like a cloaked figure with antlers. The figure then begins walking around the balcony before stopping right at the door, then it continues to walk down the stairs. Jack opens the door to find an animal skull illuminated by candles with an inverted pentagram drawn on its forehead. Jack reports the incident to Connor, but once again Connor brushes it off as kids pulling an elaborate prank and agrees to send someone to check on him the next day. Jack reluctantly goes to sleep, still shaken by the events of the past few hours.

The next night Jack is on the lookout on the balcony of the tower when he sees a flare shoot up in the distance. The radio picks up the pleas of a lost hiker, so Jack answers and attempts to help him. The hiker claims to see Jack, despite him still being in his tower, and to his horror, the hiker tells him that he sees someone whistling. Before Jack can help he is interrupted by a knock at the door. Jack answers the door to find Billy, who had been sent by Connor to send some supplies and check on him. Jack tells Billy about the skull but they can't do anything because Jack forgot to take a picture of it. Nonetheless, Billy hands Jack the supplies and walks off, and Jack records the weather and has dinner. While Jack is collecting firewood he is startled by a man named Silas who claims to be doing maintenance on the radio tower. Jack tells Connor about Silas, but Connor is doubtful, saying that the radio tower was shuttered years ago due to a storm that destroyed its systems. Connor tells Jack to report Silas next time he sees him before they both go to sleep.

The next night Connor informs Jack of a system update on the park's computers. Jack installs the update but immediately afterwards the power goes out; the generator had run out of fuel. For the next two days Jack had to cover Connor's area due to Connor's generator being under maintenance as well as checking in on him twice a day. One night Jack is awoken by Connor reporting a camper through the radio. Jack investigates the smoke from the safety of his balcony, although instead of campers, he spots a group of cultists, wearing the same robes that he had seen, burning the body of the hiker from the day before. Jack grabs his camera to get evidence of the cult, but they spot the flash of Jack's camera and rush towards his tower. Jack hides under his bed as he hears one of them run up the stairs before forcefully entering the cabin. The cultist briefly searches the room before moving outside to search the balcony. Jack takes the opportunity to escape, but the cultist spots him and pursues him. Jack quickly hides in a portable toilet while the cultist continues searching outside. When the cultist is out of sight Jack sprints away from the tower and back to his RV, escaping before the cultist can catch up.

An investigation is conducted by authorities the next morning but they find no signs of misconduct, and as a result nobody believes Jack's story.

==== Woodbury Getaway (2024) ====
Sydney Harper finishes her final shift at a consulting firm before going on a weekend trip with her college friends Mike and Nora. She books a cabin in Woodbury and leaves to get picked up by Mike.

Sydney and Mike meet in the underground parking of Sydney’s residency and they begin their journey to the rental. On their way they stop at a small pizzeria and they get news that Nora will be later than expected. While eating their pizza they are approached by a hitchhiker, but they refuse to take him, angering the hitchhiker. Brushing it off, they get back in Mike's truck and continue the trip.

After a lengthly drive Mike and Sydney arrive at the cabin and they unpack. While exploring the house they unexpectedly run into Rick, the owner of the house. Rick shows them around the second floor of the cabin as well as the basement before leaving. After Rick leaves and Sydney takes a shower, she and Mike go fishing for carp at the creek behind the cabin, and afterwards they begin cooking the carp for dinner. While the carp is cooking Sydney and Mike play a board game, and afterwards they both watch a TV show while eating the carp. While Mike is upstairs he texts Sydney claiming that someone is under his bed, but it turns out to be a prank so that they can play hide-and-seek together. Sydney runs outside and hides in the fishing shed but sees a person other than Mike walk through the house through the glass. When Sydney finds Mike in a closet during the game, Mike claims to have heard something in the attic, but it turns out to just be Rick's cat. During their final game Sydney discovers Rick in the bathroom with a hammer, but Rick claims he's only there to fix the sink and that he doesn't need to ask permission to enter the cabin. Mike comes shortly after Sydney discovers Rick and an argument breaks out between the pair and Rick, where Rick ultimately storms out of the house.

Later that night after Sydney falls asleep, she wakes up to hear Mike knocking at her door. Mike acts erratically and attempts to make advances towards Sydney, but he is interrupted by a text from Nora saying that she's gotten trapped in a snowstorm after her tire blew, so Mike volunteers to pick her up while Sydney stays at the cabin.

An hour later, Sydney hears the doorbell ring, and she hears the voice of the hitchhiker from the pizzeria pleading to come inside. When she refuses the hitchhiker aggressively yells and bangs at the door, now demanding rather than begging. The hitchhiker admits to watching her and Mike while they were fishing at the creek, and at that point Sydney threatens to call the police. She tries to go back to sleep until she hears banging outside, followed by the hitchhiker screaming. Sydney texts Rick asking him to come back to the cabin to help with the situation, and moments later Rick arrives with a hammer in his hand and he discovers that Sydney is alone in the cabin. Moments later, Sydney gets a text from Rick, despite the fact that he's in the house, but Rick texts back saying that he hasn't been to the rental in weeks, meaning the man in the house is an imposter. The man demands to stay in the cabin for longer, which is when Sydney confronts him. The man's demeanor completely changes, and he suddenly runs towards the front door and breaks the handle, trapping Sydney inside. She runs down to the basement and hides under the stairs while the man searches the basement. When he goes into an off-limits room in the basement Sydney sprints up the stairs, but partway up her phone rings, alerting the man. Sydney runs to her room and hides in the closet while the man continues searching. The doorbell rings again, Mike and Nora have come back to the cabin. When the man goes downstairs Sydney goes up to the attic before her phone rings again, and once she's sure that the man is gone she meets Mike and Nora at the front door where she tells them everything about that night.

The real Rick calls the police but the man is nowhere to be found. Sydney and Mike come to the conclusion that the man was secretly living in the cabin when it wasn't being rented, and Rick ended up giving them a full refund.

=== Fears to Fathom [Together] ===
Fears to Fathom [Together] is a spinoff of the original Fears to Fathom series that is exclusively co-op and is tied into the original episodes. Similar to the main Fears to Fathom series, Fears to Fathom [Together] shows the perspectives of survivors of alleged real-life stories.

There is currently one episode, titled Scratch Creek, which released on 10 June, 2026.

==== Scratch Creek (2026) ====
Tessa Langley and Marcus Reed, a couple, are moving from Oregon to Washington for a job offer Marcus took. They hurry, since they started loading their stuff in the evening, despite having to leave early that morning. They quickly load their things into a rented trailer and start their journey.

As they are driving, the wind begins to pick up to the point where a tree falls in the middle of the road. After moving the tree, they keep driving and stop at a gas station. Going inside, it becomes clear that it is abandoned, filled with graffiti and trash bags. They encounter a homeless man inside, who warns them about the town they are about to pass through, named Scratch Creek, while particularly suggesting that they wouldn't take kindly to Marcus's race. They ignore the man and leave the abandoned gas station. As they drive up a hill, a light on the dashboard begins flashing and the car starts to struggle. They wait until they get past the hill to see if the alert goes away, which it doesn't.

They decide to stop at another gas station where they can get assistance from a mechanic, but it seems that no one is there, despite the station being open. While searching a scrapyard behind the station, they find a worker who's name is Harold, who seems skeptical about them due to Marcus' skin colour. Harold seems to have identified the problem with the car when he is suddenly pulled away by his boss, Buck. When he comes back with Buck, he announces that the car can't be fixed by him, but he suggests to the couple that they go to Bill's, a friend of Buck who also used to work as a mechanic for the station, but is now retired. When Harold goes for a small patch job on the engine, Buck bluntly calls out Marcus' skin colour, much more so than the homeless man and Harold beforehand, frustrating Marcus. Nonetheless, Marcus and Tessa get back in the car and drive to Bill's house.

They get to Bill's house as the engine is about to give out again. As they knock on the door, they are greeted aggressively by Bill's wife Charlotte, who berates them for not being from the "New Temple", but when they tell her that their car broke down and they need Bill's help, she is quick to assist. Moments later, Bill comes out to meet Marcus and Tessa, and they explain to him what Harold initially thought was wrong with the engine before he was pulled away by Buck. Bill takes a slight glance at the engine before coming to the conclusion that the car can't support the weight of the trailer carrying their heavy furniture, and that he can't fix it that night. When Marcus and Tessa ask what to do, Charlotte suggests going to a bed and breakfast ran by a woman named Julia, located up a small trail near the house. After the suggestion, Bill and Charlotte quickly go inside. Tessa is strongly against going up the trail, not trusting Scratch Creek, where they've never been, as well as the way the residents have been acting around Marcus, but Marcus argues that they have no alternatives.

Marcus and Tessa follow the trail up to Julia's bed and breakfast, and then meet Julia at the front door. Julia explains stories regarding the house, including why Charlotte was talking about the "New Temple", as well as there being an Old Temple behind the house. Julia seems warm, polite, and welcoming to the two. However, the warm, polite, and welcoming atmosphere of Julia's bed and breakfast quickly changes when a shaken resident runs out the door, claiming to want "no part" in why Marcus and Tessa are staying with Julia before running out the front door. Marcus hears two men talking outside the bathroom he's in, but when he opens the door, the two men stop talking and retreat to staff only rooms. Despite the odd encounters, Julia reappears, still welcoming towards her guests and shows them around the house. After the tour, Julia welcomes the couple to their room.

After Marcus and Tessa check into the room, Tessa goes for a bath, but she quickly realises that there are no towels in the bathroom, so she asks Marcus to call Julia for towels. Julia informs him that the staff have gone to sleep and that Marcus should get the towels, which are located in the basement of the temple. Marcus goes to the temple and grabs the towels, but when he is going back up from the basement, he finds that the door has been closed and locked. Meanwhile, back in the room, Tessa hears a knock at the door, but she can't see anyone when looking through the peephole. Then she hears another knock on the door, and this time, one of the staff members are at the door. The staff member, whose name is Henry, claims that Julia sent him to bring linens to the room, even though Marcus was already gone, and Julia claimed that the staff were asleep. When Tessa confronts him with that, Henry becomes audibly upset and tells Tessa that Marcus "isn't as close to coming back as ya think," calls her honey, and tells her to open the door. In the temple's basement, Marcus discovers that behind a fake wall, the basement goes even deeper. Into what looks like a secret mine, also has coffins in the rooms. Marcus opens another door that leads to the house's basement, and finds an exit. But, immediately upon escaping the basement, he is startled by Bobby, another one of the workers. Marcus explains that he got stuck collecting towels, and Bobby seems to accept his explanation, and walks away. Marcus thinks to not tell Tessa about the basement, as he believes that she would want to leave if he told her. Marcus heads upstairs and sees Henry at the door, so Henry walks back to his room. Marcus remembers that he forgot to sign the guestbook that Julia asked them to sign, so Tessa volunteers, especially because she needs to get water downstairs. Tessa goes downstairs and signs the guestbook before going to drink some water. As she's leaving the kitchen, she runs into Julia, who confronts her about Marcus being in the house's basement. Tessa is confused since Marcus never told her about going in there. Julia seems to brush it off, but with a sense of hostility in her tone. When Tessa gets back to her room, she tells Marcus about her encounter with Julia, and how Julia told her that he was in the house's basement. Marcus explains the tunnel from the temple to the house, but Tessa is still upset that he didn't tell her. After their argument, they both go to bed.

While Marcus is asleep, Tessa goes downstairs to get more water. While Tessa is gone, Marcus wakes up to the sound of glass breaking in the bathroom, or a window being unlocked depending on the choices made. He gets up and hides under the bed as a man walks into the room. As Tessa is coming back upstairs, she sees a park ranger knocking at the door. Julia answers and Tessa hears the two of them talking about someone who escaped, most likely the man Tessa encountered in the reception when she and Marcus first entered the house. The ranger, revealed to be Connor Hawkins (from Fears to Fathom: Ironbark Lookout), seems worried that their actions will be exposed, and Julia informs Connor of Marcus. Once they both leave, Tessa sneaks back upstairs to check on Marcus. She knocks on the door, unaware of the intruder in their room. When the man hears the knocks, he hides in the closet, expecting Tessa to open the door. Marcus springs out from under the bed and rushes out the door, informing Tessa of the danger. As they are running downstairs, they see Bobby come out of their room wearing a black mask, also armed with a sickle. They run down to the basement and hide in coffins, while Bobby, Henry, and other people wearing robes while wielding sickles run by. Just before they continue fleeing, Connor appears and searches the room that Marcus and Tessa are in. After checking the room, missing the coffins, Marcus and Tessa get out of the coffins and bolt upstairs, but Connor sees them and chases after them. They both run out the front door back down the trail back to Bill's house.

They sneak around the side of the house and see Bill armed with a rifle on his front porch. Buck from the gas station arrives in his truck, also aware that Marcus and Tessa escaped Julia's bed and breakfast. Bill goes inside after Charlotte calls him, leaving Buck to keep guard. Marcus and Tessa sneak past Buck while he's patrolling the driveway and they hide in their trailer. Bill calls Buck inside, so while there is no one outside, they drive away, but since the trailer is too heavy, they have no choice but to leave it behind.

Just as they make it to the main road, the car gives out again. They call the police while anxiously waiting to see if the cult would catch up to them, but they don't. The police investigate the area but find nothing incriminating. Marcus suggests that they both personally confront them, but Tessa realises that it's more safe to let it go.

== Development ==
=== Concept and influences ===
Development for Fears to Fathom began around July 2021 with the creation of its first installment, Fears to Fathom: Home Alone. Indian developer Mukul Negi had revealed to IGN India that while working as a solo game developer, he had one "major challenge", which was dealing with a lack of personal motivation while creating the Fears to Fathom. Negi also revealed his struggles during the making of the game, and how he almost gave up on releasing the franchise's first episode. He highlighted that he realized game developers are never really "a good judge of their own games". Negi published the game under his game development studio, RayllStudios, which consisted of him and the Fears to Fathom's composer, Nathan Hall. He would also announce a co-op video game titled Fears to Fathom Together. Negi said that as new episodes came out, visual, gameplay and graphic designs would gradually improve. The Fears to Fathom episodes are known to draw influence from real survival experiences submitted by its players. The story of the second installment, Fears to Fathom: Norwood Hitchhike, was also conceived by Negi, and centers on a 19-year-old girl that experiences abnormalities while driving down the interstate to Norwood Valley. The Fears to Fathom soundtracks featured songs scored by composer Nathan Hall; includes music in the downtempo and chill-hop genres.

== Reception and legacy ==
The Fears to Fathom franchise has received generally positive reviews and praised for how it based its game on the real-life survival stories of players, while other critics had criticized the game's pacing. Ariel Chloe Mann at GamerGrin wrote that Fears to Fathom: Carson House was a "pretty cool mystery" and "isn't very boring once it get's going". While The Lineup's Michael J. Seidlinger said that it was "how effectively the game portrays [...] real-world survival stories" that made it "such a scary experience".

Fears to Fathom was cited as an influence for the 2024 stealth horror game, Christmas Mutilator.

The franchise is currently being developed for film and television.
