= Index of Washington (state)-related articles =

The location of the state of Washington in the United States of America

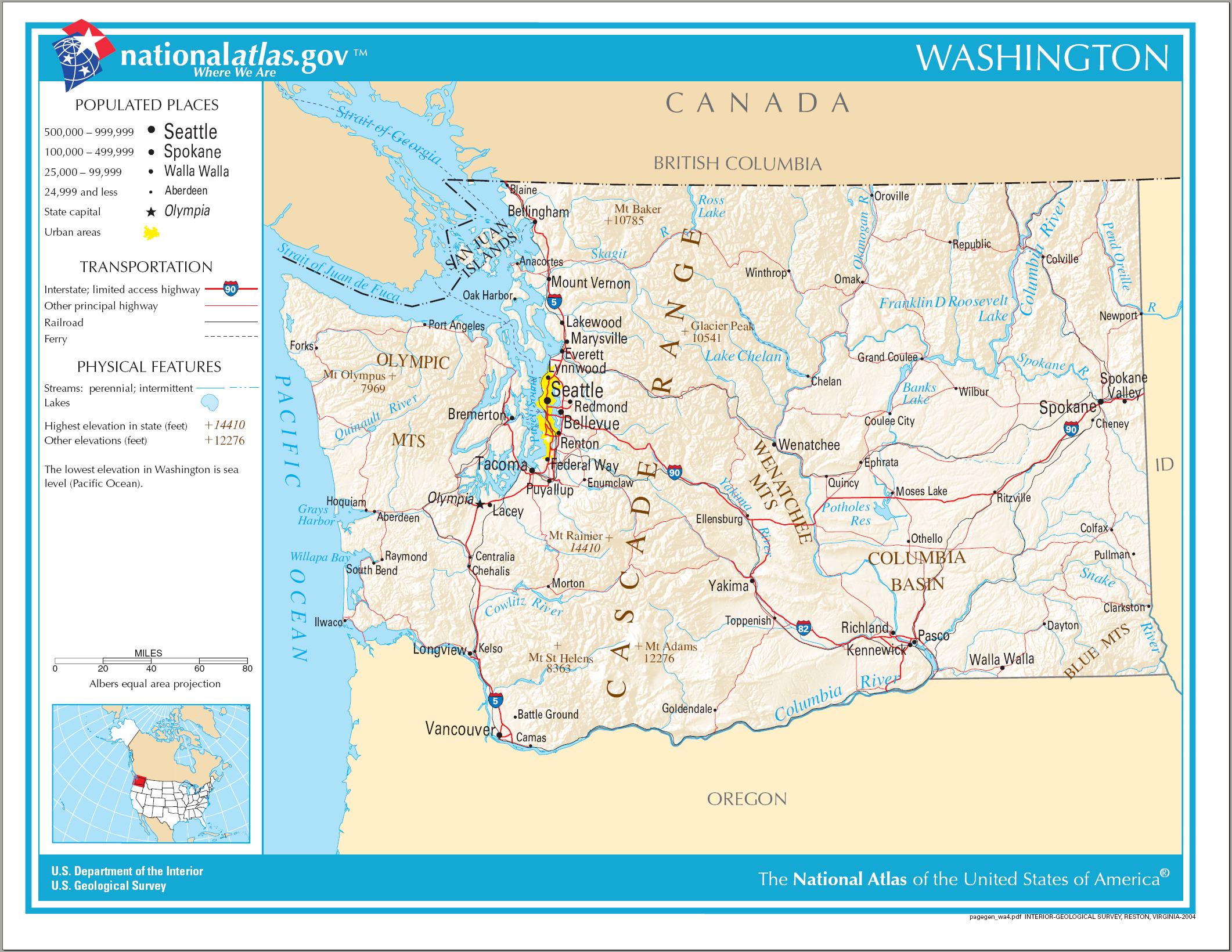
An enlargeable map of the state of Washington

The following is an alphabetical list of articles related to the U.S. state of Washington.

== 0–9 ==
- .wa.us – Internet second-level domain for the state of Washington
- 42nd state to join the United States of America

== A ==
- Adjacent states and province:
  - Province of British Columbia
  - State of Idaho
  - State of Oregon
- Agriculture in Washington
  - Category:Agriculture in Washington (state)
- AIDS Housing Association of Tacoma
- Airports in Washington
- Amusement parks in Washington
- Anglo-American Convention of 1818
- Aquaria in Washington
- Arboreta in Washington
- American Redoubt
- Archaeology in Washington
  - Archaeological sites in Washington
- Architecture in Washington
  - Category:Architecture in Washington (state)
- Art museums and galleries in Washington
- Astronomical observatories in Washington

== B ==
- Beaches of Washington
- Botanical gardens in Washington
- Buildings and structures in Washington

== C ==
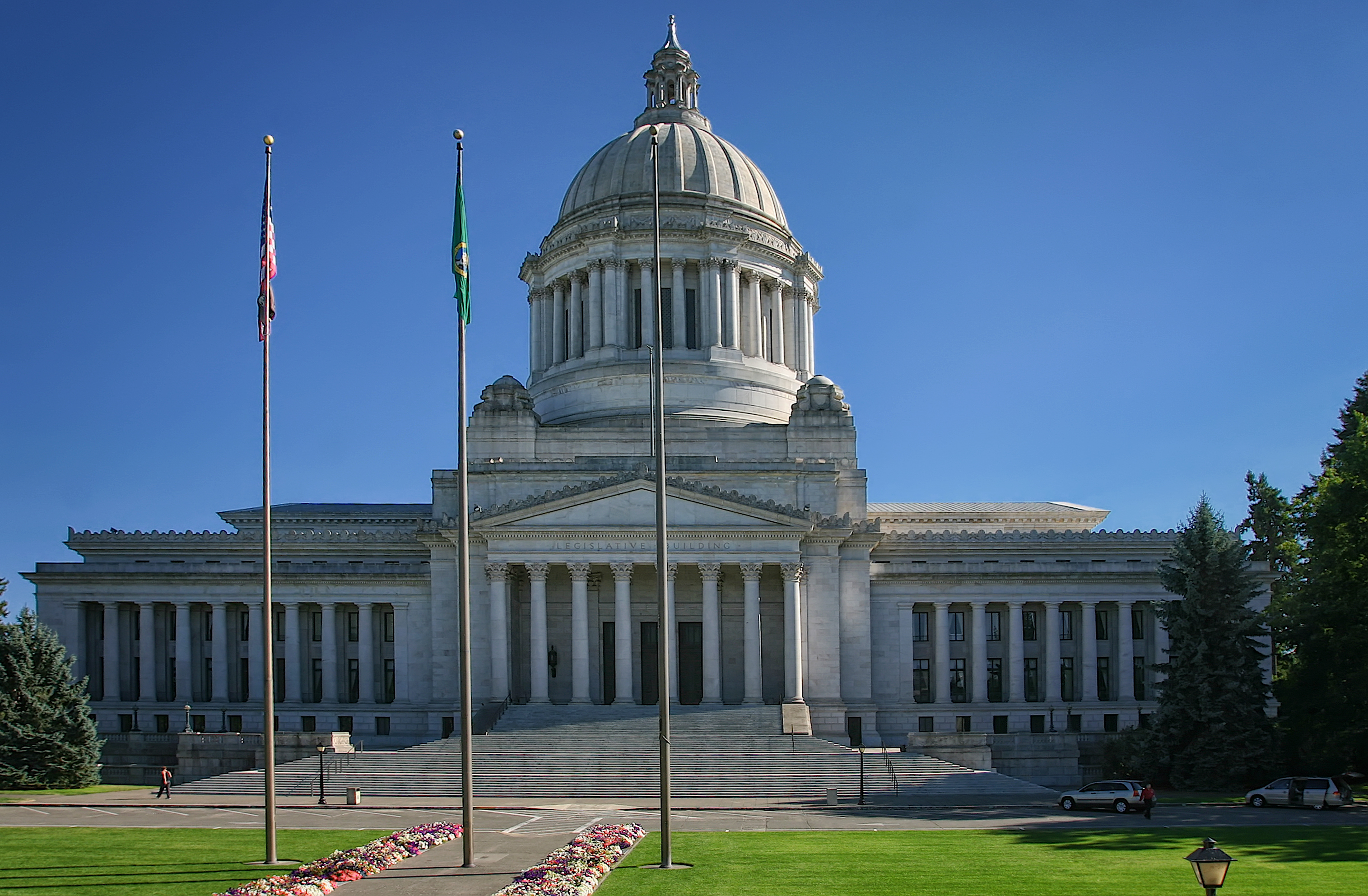
The Washington State Capitol campus in Olympia

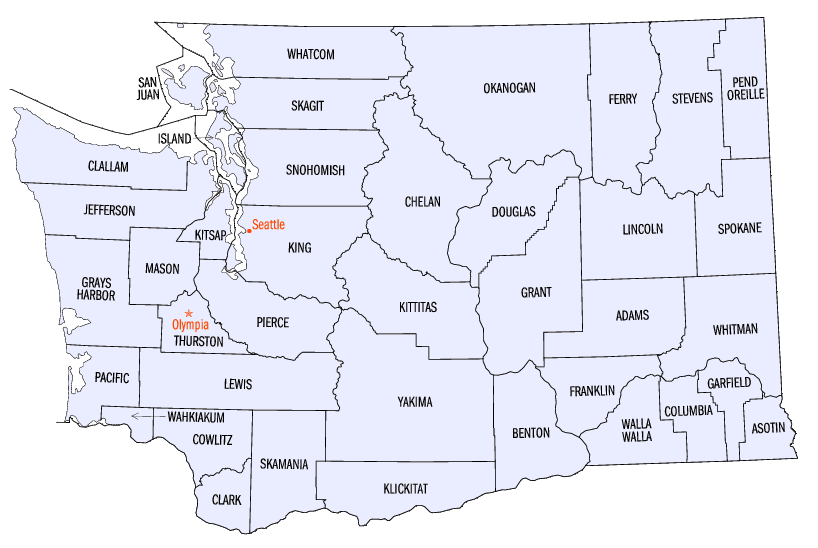
An enlargeable map of the 39 counties of the State of Washington

- Cannabis in Washington
- Canyons and gorges of Washington
- Capital punishment in Washington
- Capital of the State of Washington
- Capitol of the State of Washington
- Caves of Washington
- Census statistical areas of Washington
- Cities in Washington
- Climate of Washington
- Colleges and universities in Washington
- Columbia River
- Communications in Washington
- Companies in Washington
- Constitution of the State of Washington
- Convention centers in Washington
- Counties of the State of Washington
- Culture of Washington

== D ==
- Demographics of Washington
- Democratic Party of Washington State

== E ==
- Economy of Washington
  - Category:Economy of Washington (state)
- Education in Washington
  - Category:Education in Washington (state)
- Elections in Washington (state)
  - Category:Elections in Washington (state)
- Environment of Washington
  - Ecology of the North Cascades

== F ==
The Flag of the State of Washington

- Festivals in Washington
- Fjords of Washington
- Flag of the State of Washington
- Forts in Washington
  - Fort Vancouver
  - Category:Forts in Washington (state)
- Foundation for Early Learning

== G ==
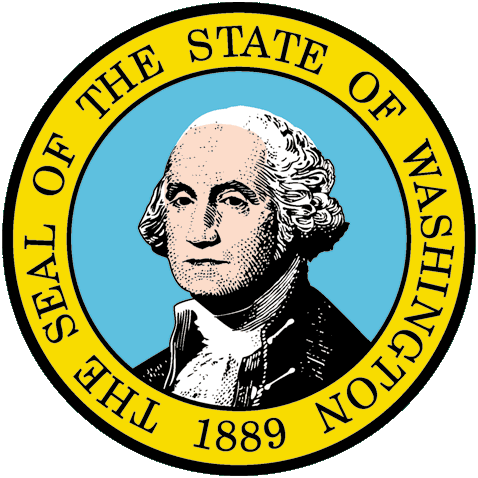
The Great Seal of the State of Washington

- Geography of Washington
  - Category:Geography of Washington (state)
- Geology of Washington
  - Category:Geology of Washington (state)
  - List of rocks in Washington
- Ghost towns in Washington
  - Category:Ghost towns in Washington (state)
- Glaciers of Washington
- Golf clubs and courses in Washington
- Government of the State of Washington
  - Category:Government of Washington (state)
- Governor of the State of Washington
  - List of governors of Washington
- Great Seal of the State of Washington
- Guaranteed Education Tuition Program

== H ==
- Healthiest State in the Nation Campaign
- Heritage railroads in Washington
- High schools of Washington
- Higher education in Washington
- Highway system of Washington
  - Highway routes in Washington
  - History of Washington's state highway system
- Hiking trails in Washington
- History of Washington (state)
  - Historical outline of Washington
    - Category:History of Washington (state)
- Hospitals in Washington
- Hot springs of Washington
- House of Representatives of the State of Washington

== I ==
- Images of Washington
  - Commons:Category:Washington (state)
- Interstate highway routes in Washington
- Islands of Washington

== J ==
Jefferson County

== L ==
- Lakes of Washington
  - Lake Washington
  - Category:Lakes of Washington (state)
- Landmarks in Washington
- Lewis and Clark Expedition, 1804-1806
- Libertarian Party of Washington
- Lieutenant Governor of the State of Washington
- Lists related to the State of Washington:
  - List of airports in Washington (state)
  - List of Carnegie libraries in Washington (state)
  - List of census statistical areas in Washington
  - List of cities in Washington
  - List of colleges and universities in Washington (state)
  - List of counties in Washington
  - List of dams and reservoirs in Washington
  - List of forts in Washington
  - List of ghost towns in Washington
  - List of governors of Washington
  - List of high schools in Washington (state)
  - List of highway routes in Washington
  - List of hospitals in Washington (state)
  - List of Interstate highway routes in Washington
  - List of islands of Washington
  - List of lakes of Washington (state)
  - List of law enforcement agencies in Washington (state)
  - List of lieutenant governors of Washington
  - List of museums in Washington (state)
  - List of National Historic Landmarks in Washington
  - List of newspapers in Washington
  - List of people from Washington (state)
  - List of power stations in Washington (state)
  - List of radio stations in Washington (state)
  - List of Washington (state) railroads
  - List of Registered Historic Places in Washington
  - List of rivers of Washington (state)
  - List of school districts in Washington
  - List of species native to Washington
  - List of state forests in Washington
  - List of state parks in Washington
  - List of state prisons in Washington
  - List of symbols of the State of Washington
  - List of television stations in Washington (state)
  - List of towns in Washington
  - List of unincorporated communities in Washington
  - List of Washington's congressional delegations
  - List of United States congressional districts in Washington
  - List of United States representatives from Washington
  - List of United States senators from Washington

== M ==
- Maps of Washington
- Mass media in Washington
- Monuments and memorials in Washington
- Mountains of Washington
  - Mount Rainier
- Museums in Washington
  - Category:Museums in Washington (state)
- Music of Washington
  - Category:Music of Washington (state)
  - Category:Musical groups from Washington (state)
  - Category:Musicians from Washington (state)

== N ==
- National forests of Washington
- Natural gas pipelines in Washington
- Natural history of Washington
- Nature centers in Washington
- Newspapers of Washington

== O ==
- Olympia, Washington, territorial and state capital since 1853
- Oregon Country, 1818–1846
- Oregon Treaty of 1846
- Outdoor sculptures in Washington
- Outline of Washington infrastructure

== P ==
- Pacific Northwest Waterways Association
- People from Washington
  - Category:People from Washington (state)
    - Category:People from Washington (state) by populated place
    - Category:People from Washington (state) by county
    - Category:People from Washington (state) by occupation
- Politics of Washington
  - Libertarian Party of Washington
  - Socialist Party of Washington
  - Washington State Democratic Party
  - Washington State Republican Party
- Category:Populated places in Washington (state)
  - Cities in Washington
  - Towns in Washington
  - Census Designated Places in Washington
  - Other unincorporated communities in Washington
  - List of ghost towns in Washington
- Protected areas of Washington
- Provisional Government of Oregon, 1843–1848

== R ==
- Radio stations in Washington
- Railroad museums in Washington
- Railroads in Washington
- Registered historic places in Washington
- Religion in Washington
  - Category:Religion in Washington (state)
- Republican Party of Washington State
- Rivers of Washington

== S ==
- Scenic and Recreational Highways
- School districts of Washington
- Scouting in Washington
- Seattle
  - Books about Seattle
- Senate of the State of Washington
- Ski areas and resorts in Washington
- Snake River
- Socialist Party of Washington
- Solar power in Washington (state)
- Spokane, Washington
- Sports in Washington
- Sports venues in Washington
- State Capitol of Washington
- State of Washington
  - Constitution of the State of Washington
  - Government of the State of Washington
    - Category:Government of Washington (state)
    - Governor of the State of Washington
    - Legislature of the State of Washington
      - Senate of the State of Washington
      - House of Representatives of the State of Washington
    - Supreme Court of the State of Washington
- State parks of Washington
- State prisons of Washington
- Structures in Washington
- Supreme Court of the State of Washington
- Symbols of the State of Washington
  - Category:Symbols of Washington (state)

== T ==
- Tacoma, Washington
- Telecommunications in Washington
- Telephone area codes in Washington
- Television shows set in Washington
- Television stations in Washington
- Territory of Oregon, (1848–1853)-1859
- Territory of Washington, 1853–1889
- Theatres in Washington
- Tourism in Washington
- Towns in Washington
- Transportation in Washington
  - Category:Transportation in Washington (state)

== U ==
- United States of America
  - States of the United States of America
  - United States census statistical areas of Washington
  - Washington's congressional delegations
  - United States congressional districts in Washington
  - United States Court of Appeals for the Ninth Circuit
  - United States District Court for the Eastern District of Washington
  - United States District Court for the Western District of Washington
  - United States representatives from Washington
  - United States senators from Washington
- Universities and colleges in Washington
- US-WA – ISO 3166-2:US region code for the State of Washington

== V ==
- Vancouver, Washington

== W ==
- WA – United States Postal Service postal code for the State of Washington
- Washington
  - Category:Washington (state)
- Washington Public Ports Association
- Washington Shoe Company
- Washington State Capitol
- Washington State Department of Information Services
- Washington wine
- Waterfalls of Washington
  Wikimedia
  - Commons:Category:Washington (state)
  - Wikinews:Category:Washington
    - Wikinews:Portal:Washington
  - Wikipedia Category:Washington (state)
    - Wikipedia Portal:Washington (state)
    - Wikipedia:WikiProject Washington
      - Category:WikiProject Washington
      - Category:WikiProject Washington participants
- Wind power in Washington

== X ==
- Xbox

== Y ==
- Yakima, Washington

== Z ==
- Zoos in Washington
