= Obstetric labor complication =

- Specialty: Obstetrics

An obstetric labor complication is a difficulty or abnormality that arises during the process of childbirth.

The Trust for America's Health reports that as of 2011, about one third of American births have some complications; many are directly related to the mother's health including increasing rates of obesity, type 2 diabetes, and physical inactivity. The U.S. Centers for Disease Control and Prevention (CDC) has led an initiative to improve women's health previous to conception in an effort to improve both neonatal and maternal death rates.

== Types ==
=== Amniotic fluid embolism ===
An amniotic fluid embolism (AFE) is a rare childbirth (obstetric) emergency in which amniotic fluid enters the blood stream of the mother to trigger a serious reaction. This reaction then results in cardiorespiratory (heart and lung) collapse and massive bleeding (coagulopathy).

=== Bleeding ===
Obstetrical bleeding is the leading cause of death in birthing mothers globally, especially in the developing world. Heavy blood loss may lead to hypovolemic shock, insufficient perfusion of vital organs and death if not rapidly treated. Blood transfusion may be life-saving. Causes of heavy bleeding during labour include placental abruption and uterine rupture.

=== Umbilical cord prolapse ===
Umbilical cord prolapse occurs when the umbilical cord comes out of the uterus with or before the presenting part of the fetus. Umbilical cord prolapse should always be considered a possibility when there is a sudden decrease in fetal heart rate or variable decelerations, particularly after the rupture of membranes. With overt prolapses, the diagnosis can be confirmed if the cord can be palpated on vaginal examination. Without overt prolapse, the diagnosis can only be confirmed after a cesarean section, though even then it will not always be evident at time of procedure.

=== Obstructed labour ===
The second stage of labour may be delayed or lengthy due to poor or uncoordinated uterine action, an abnormal uterine position such as breech or shoulder dystocia, and cephalopelvic disproportion (a small pelvis or large infant). Prolonged labour may result in maternal exhaustion, fetal distress, and other complications including obstetric fistula.

=== Placental abruption ===
Placental abruption is separation of the placenta from the uterus. Treatment of placental abruption during labour is immediate delivery if the fetus is mature (36 weeks or older), or if a younger fetus or the mother is in distress.

=== Premature labour ===
Premature labour is labour that spontaneously occurs earlier than 37 weeks gestational age.

=== Nuchal cord ===
A nuchal cord is a complication that occurs when the umbilical cord becomes wrapped around the fetal neck.

=== Perinatal asphyxia ===
Perinatal asphyxia is a medical condition resulting from deprivation of oxygen to a newborn infant during labour. Hypoxic damage can occur to most of the infant's organs (heart, lungs, liver, gut, kidneys), but brain damage is of most concern and the least likely to quickly or completely heal. Treatment is immediate delivery (C-section). Causes of perinatal asphyxia include umbilical cord prolapse, nuchal cord, and obstructed labour.

=== Mechanical fetal injury ===
Risk factors for fetal birth injury include fetal macrosomia (big baby), maternal obesity, the need for instrumental delivery, and an inexperienced attendant. Specific situations that can contribute to birth injury include breech presentation, conduplicato corpore and shoulder dystocia. Most fetal birth injuries resolve without long term harm, but brachial plexus injury may lead to Erb's palsy or Klumpke's paralysis.

=== Uterine rupture ===
A uterine rupture is a serious event during childbirth by which the integrity of the myometrial wall is breached. In an incomplete rupture, the peritoneum is still intact. With a complete rupture, the contents of the uterus may spill into the peritoneal cavity or the broad ligament. A uterine rupture is a life-threatening event for both mother and baby as it typically results in severe hemorrhage and can cause perinatal asphyxia.
