= Washington Iron Works =

Former company in Seattle, Washington, United States

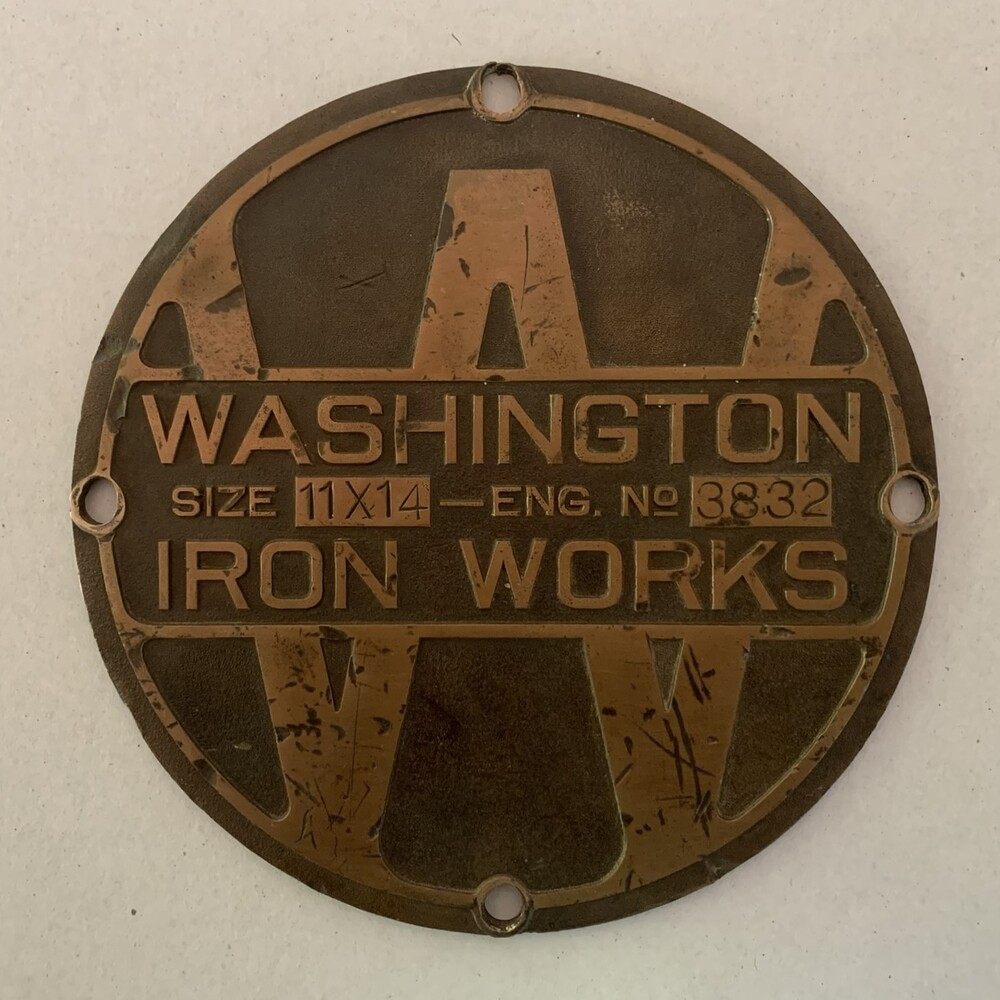
- A brass boiler plate from one of the company's winches

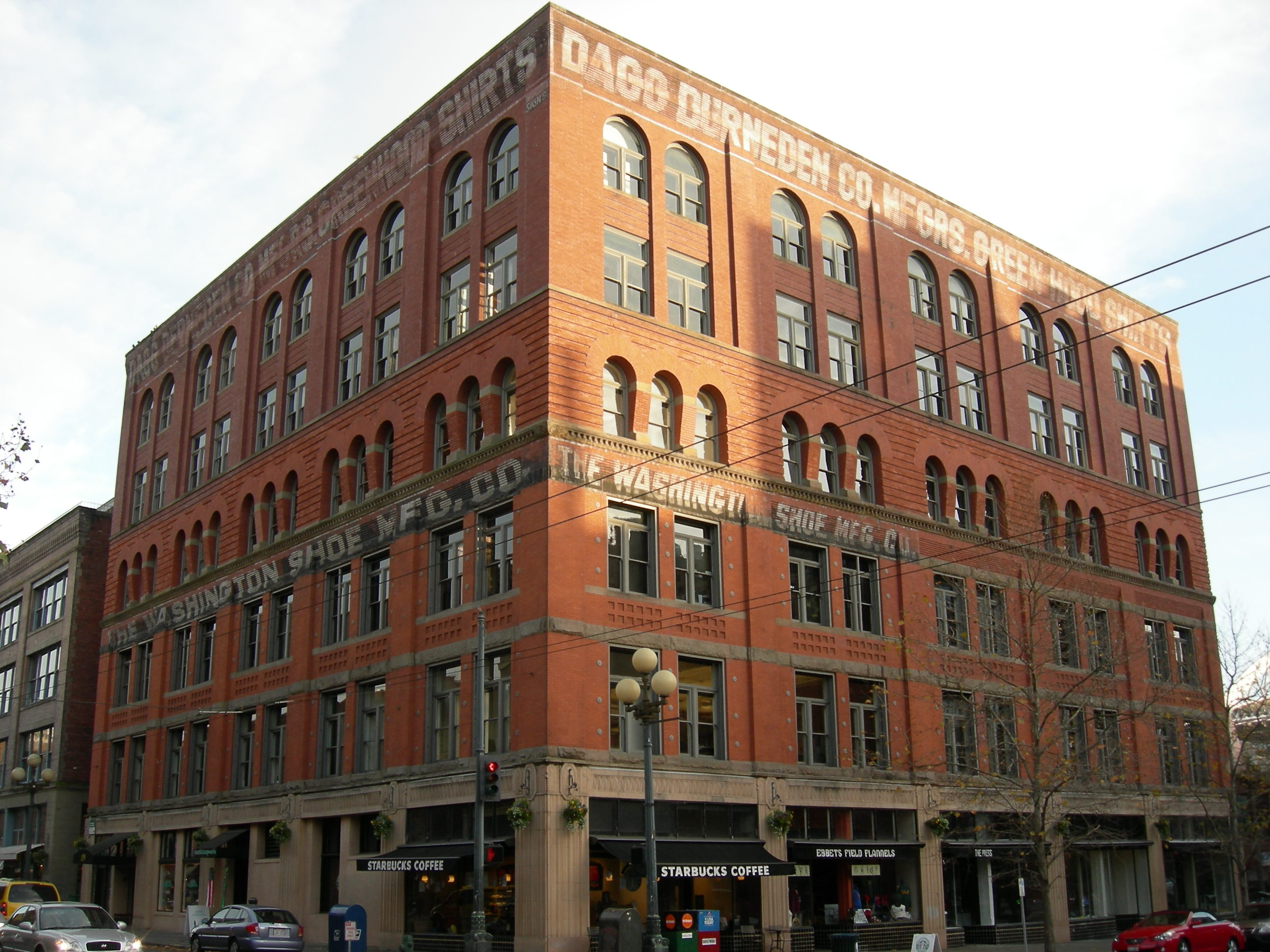
- The Seattle headquarters of the company, built in 1892 to four levels, photographed in 2007
- Type: Listed company
- Industry: Manufacturing
- Predecessor: Tenny & Frink
- Founded: 4 January 1882 in Seattle, Washington
- Founders: J. W. George; George W. Harris; John M. Frink
- Defunct: 1986
- Headquarters: Seattle, United States
- Products: Logging equipment
- Number of employees: 165 (1889)

The Washington Iron Works was a listed company based in Seattle, Washington, in the United States, founded by John M. Frink, that manufactured steam-powered logging skidders and winches.

The company was active from 1882 until the 1980s when its various divisions – manufacturing cranes, logging equipment, and presses – were gradually sold off. The factory closed in 1986.

== Description ==
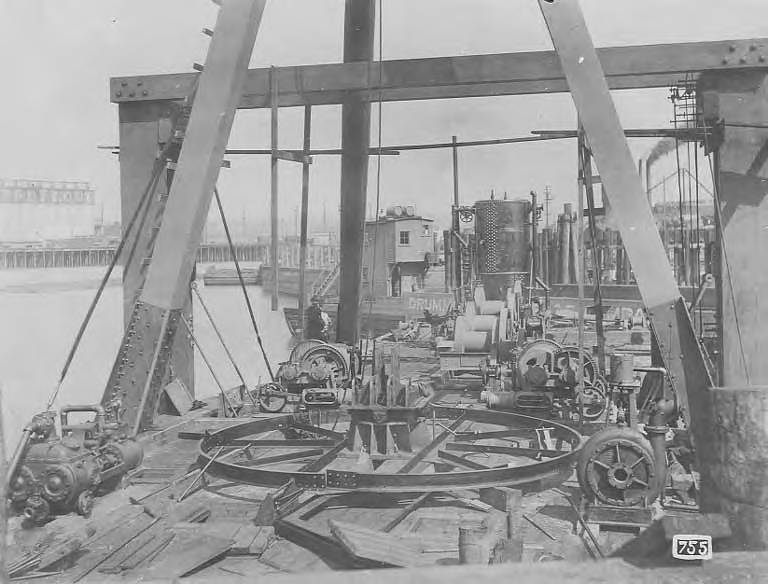
A heavy-duty dredging engine in operation, c. 1906 – c. 1928

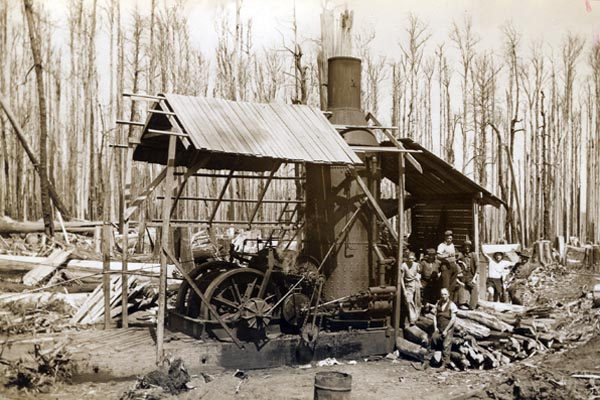
A skidder in Australia, 1939

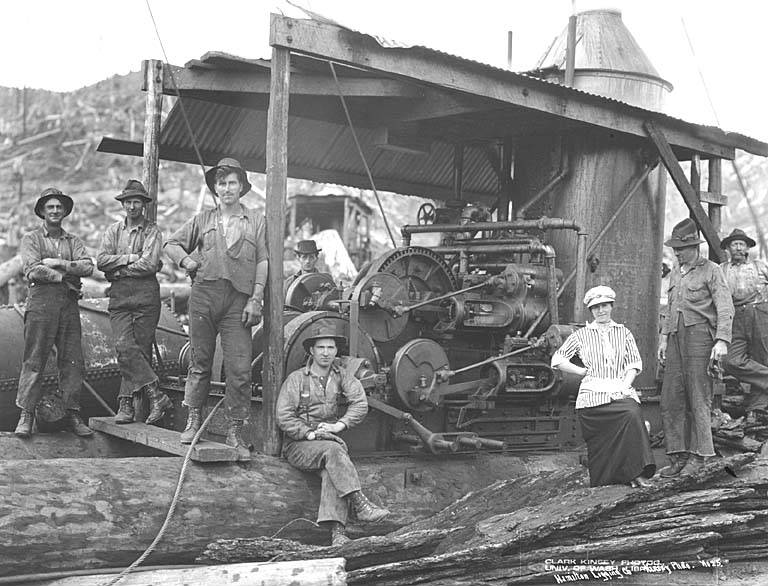
A loader and crew in Skagit County, Washington, c. 1915

Washington Iron Works engines revolutionised steam logging in the 1920s and 1930s. The steam-powered winches were mounted on heavy log skid frames which allowed the winch to be transported to new sites. Many Washington skidders can still be seen in North America.

The company was described in a 1916 publication on the history of Seattle:

On January 4, 1882, the Tenny & Frink business was reorganized as the Washington Iron Works, with J. W. George, president, George W. Harris, treasurer, and J. M. Frink, secretary and general manager. This was a joint stock company, which was reincorporated in 1884 with George W. Harris, president, James Readman, secretary, and J. M. Frink, superintendent. At the time of its reorganization the firm was employing eighteen men. In March it cast a 3.000 pound pile driver hammer for William H. Surber, a 5-ton engine frame for the new Stetson & Post mill, and in July a 7-ton fly wheel 11 feet in diameter, the largest ever cast in the city up to that time, for a new mill at Port Townsend. During 1883 fifty men were employed, 1,000 tons of iron were melted in the foundry and the machine shop finished three mill engines, one logging locomotive, eight steamboat engines and a large amount of custom work. The years 1882-83 were notable ones in the history of the iron working trade in the little city. Competent workmen were scarce, almost every foundry and machine shop was crowded with work, and customers were compelled to wait their turn. The following plants were at that time in operation in the city: the blacksmith shops of James Brannen, A. A. Holmes, J. W. Hunt, John Magee and Charles McDonald; boiler shops of Seattle Boiler Works and Oregon Boiler Works; foundries, North Pacific Iron Works, Puget Foundry and Washington Iron Works; gunsmith, S. Neuman; and the machine shops of the Columbia & Puget Sound Railroad, Moran Brothers, North Pacific Iron Works, Seattle Iron Works and Washington Iron Works. When the big fire of 1889 swept Seattle it wiped out the plant of the Washington Iron Works, which at that time consisted of a foundry, machine shop, blacksmith shop and boiler factory employing 165 workmen. Although the loss amounted to over seventy-five thousand dollars a new plant was soon being built at Ninth Avenue South and Norman Street and since that time the firm has kept pace with the growth of the city and the development of the entire Northwest country. Today it is one of the largest and best equipped plants in the West, manufacturing all kinds of heavy machinery for operation by both steam and electricity. J. M. Frink, who for so many years was at the head of the business, was the man most largely responsible for the perfecting of the modern logging engine—a machine which this company has improved until today it is making engines weighing forty tons and possessing as high as 350 horse power. The "Washington" logging engine is the recognized standard of the world and is used, not only in Washington and Oregon, but also in Alaska, British Columbia, the Philippines, Burmah, India, and in fact wherever there are logs to move. The Frink family is still in control of the business. The founder has gone to his reward on the other side of the change called death, and his son, Gerald Frink, is now president of the company. Francis G. Frink is vice president and Carman F. Bridge is secretary. The plant consists of pattern shop, forge shop, gray iron foundry, steel foundry, boiler shop and machine shop and gives employment to a crew of over two hundred and fifty men.

— History of Seattle: from the Earliest Settlement to the Present Time (1916).

== See also ==
- Manufacturing in Washington (state)
- Washington Shoe Company
- Washington Winch, East Gippsland
