= Washington Winch, East Gippsland =

Heritage-listed winch located in East Gippsland, Victoria, Australia

Washington Winch
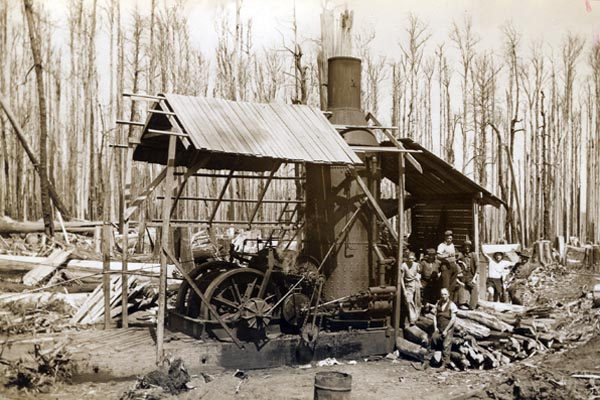
- The winch in 1939, during bushfire timber salvage operations

- Location of the winch in Victoria
- Interactive map of Washington Winch
- 37°12′37″S 147°52′59″E
- Type: Steam-powered logging skidder, or cable winch
- Location: Swifts Creek, East Gippsland, Victoria, Australia

History
- Built: 1920s
- Built by: Washington Iron Works
- Built for: Karri Timber Company, Western Australia
- Rebuilt: 1960 (at current location)

Site notes
- Management: Victorian Department of Environment, Land, Water and Planning

Victorian Heritage Register
- Official name: Washington Winch
- Type: Registered place
- Designated: 17 June 1999
- Reference no.: H1825
- Heritage overlay no.: HO923
- Category: Forestry and Timber Industry

The Washington Winch, also known as the Washington Iron Works Skidder, is a steam-powered logging skidder, or cable winch, that is located on the Lake Hill Track in the forest near Swifts Creek, in the East Gippsland region of Victoria, Australia. Its rusting relics are close to Bentley Plain and the Moscow Villa hut which was built in 1942 by firetower man Thomas William Ah Chow.

The winch was added to the Victorian Heritage Register on 17 June 1999 in recognition of its historical and scientific significance.

== Description ==
The winch was an 11 by 14 two-speed winch, manufactured by the Washington Iron Works company in Seattle, Washington and is one of two machines (#3832 & #3833) imported to Western Australia in August 1925. It was initially used by the Karri Timber Company to move the large logs. It burnt wood as fuel.

Both winches were later sold to the Forests Commission Victoria for salvaging timber in the Central Highland on the Toorongo Plateau near Noojee after the 1939 Black Friday fires. The machines were able to move large logs up to 800 metres (2,600 ft) by high-lead cables in the wet and steep terrain. They were also capable of lifting logs off the ground, over rocks and creeks back to a central landing.

The machine currently in State forest near Swifts Creek (#3832) was later sold and moved to its present site by local sawmilling company Jack Ezard in 1959, where it operated until 1960-61. The bush boss was George O'Byrne. A large logging camp supported men operating the machine. The fate of the second machine (#3833) is unknown but was possibly cannibalised for parts.

The advent of more powerful bulldozers, crawler tractors, haulage trucks and petrol chainsaws dramatically changed logging practices after World War II. It then became feasible for machines to harvest logs and for trucks to haul them directly from the forest to town-based sawmills within a few hours. The new diesel and petrol technology eventually made steam power and the Washington Winch redundant.

The winch remains a unique part of Victoria's cultural heritage and logging history; left intact with engine, spars and cabling still rigged for work it is the only steam-powered engine of its kind in Australia. The site of the winch's location is managed as a state forest by the Victorian Department of Environment, Land, Water and Planning. A roof was put over the winch to protect it from the elements, the original spars had rotted and were replaced with messmate poles and new cables were restrung in about 1999.

=== Operation ===
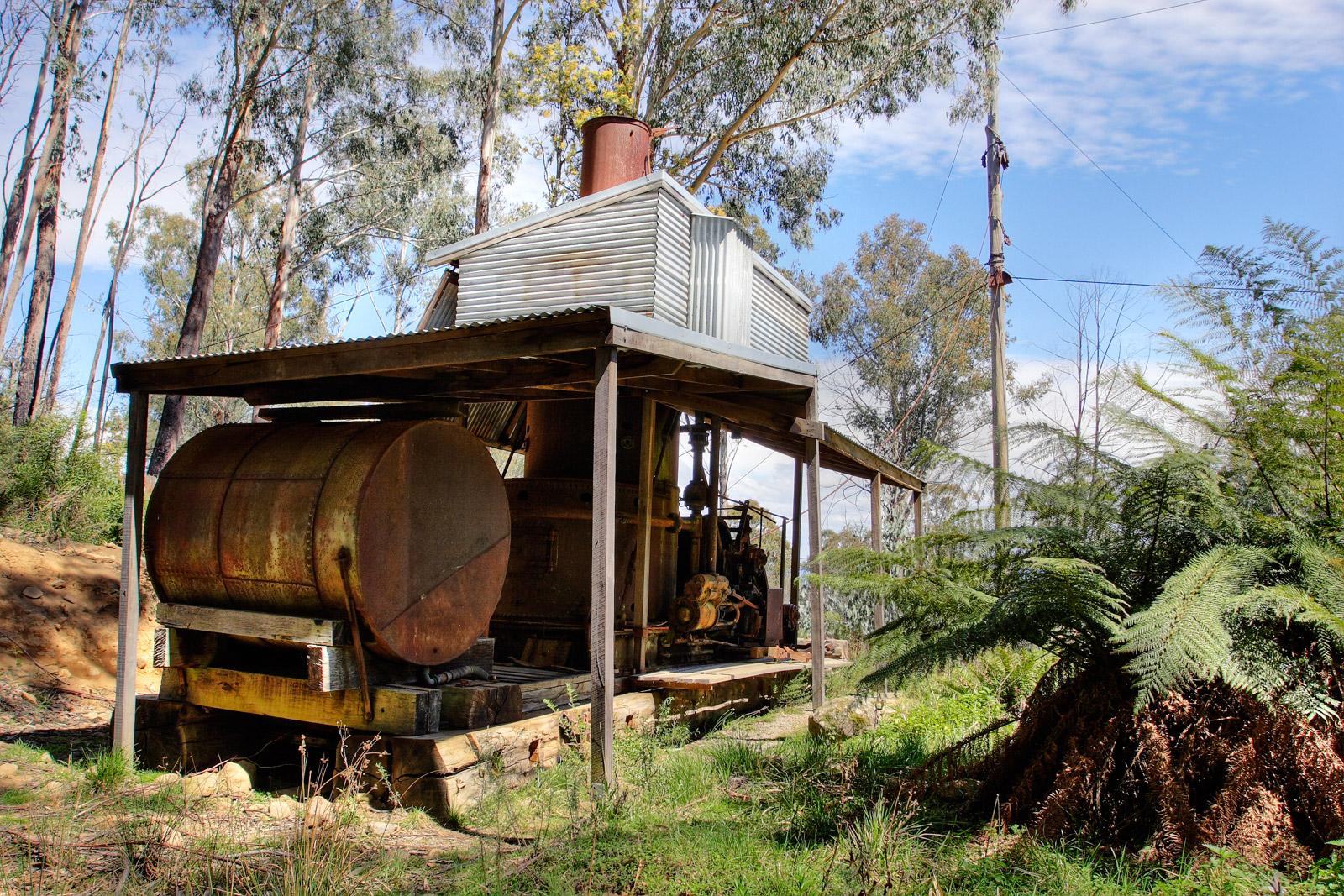
The winch in 2006

The Washington Winch operated either a high lead or a skyline system. The high lead system was not often used as it only partially lifted the logs off the ground, which caused the logs to become caught in rocks, and left behind a "snig track", which deepened over time. The skyline system involved two large spars (trees) used to create a "flying fox" to lift logs over the rough ground.

Riggers climbed 60 metres (200 ft) up trees and headed the trunk, which would cause the tree to sway violently. They then secured the spar with guy cables and attached the tackle. This operation was dangerous and physically demanding, often taking a full day, with lunch sent up on a rope.

The Washington Winch was used to harvest alpine ash logs, which were then sawn to produce high-value products such as furniture, flooring and architraves at Ezards mill at Swifts Creek.

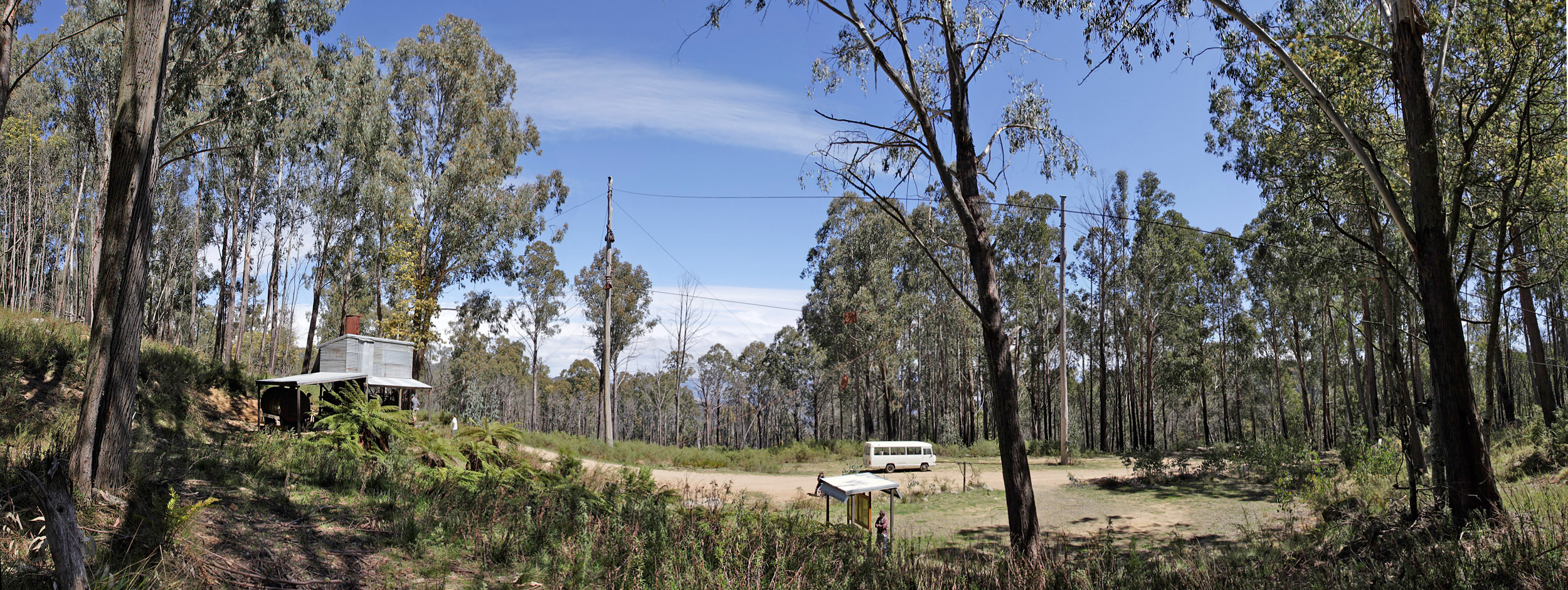
Washington Winch on the far left, with rigging and spars visible near centre of image

== Gallery ==
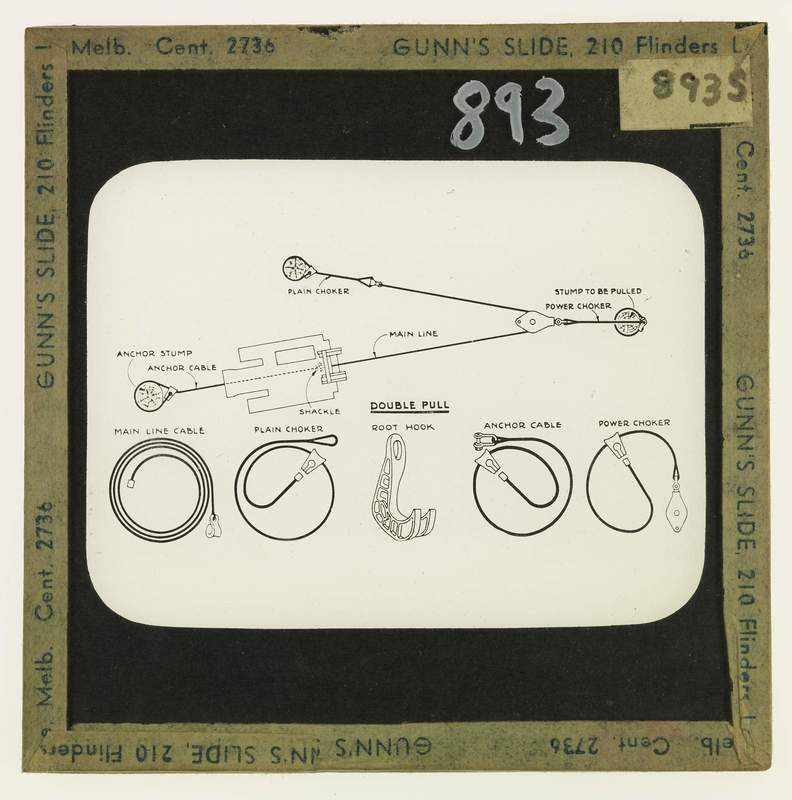
Cable logging terms

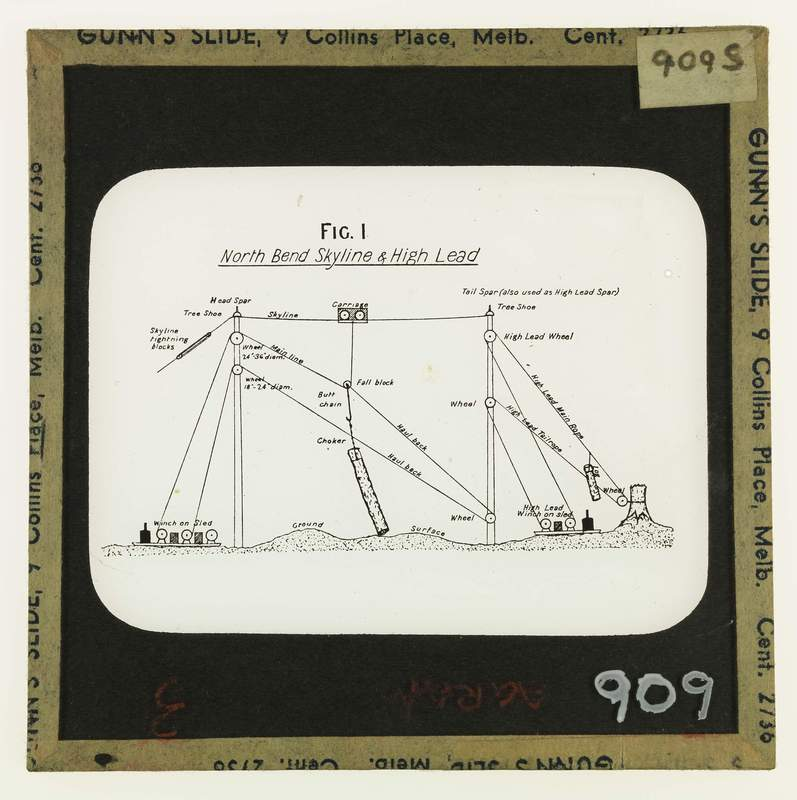
Cable logging terms

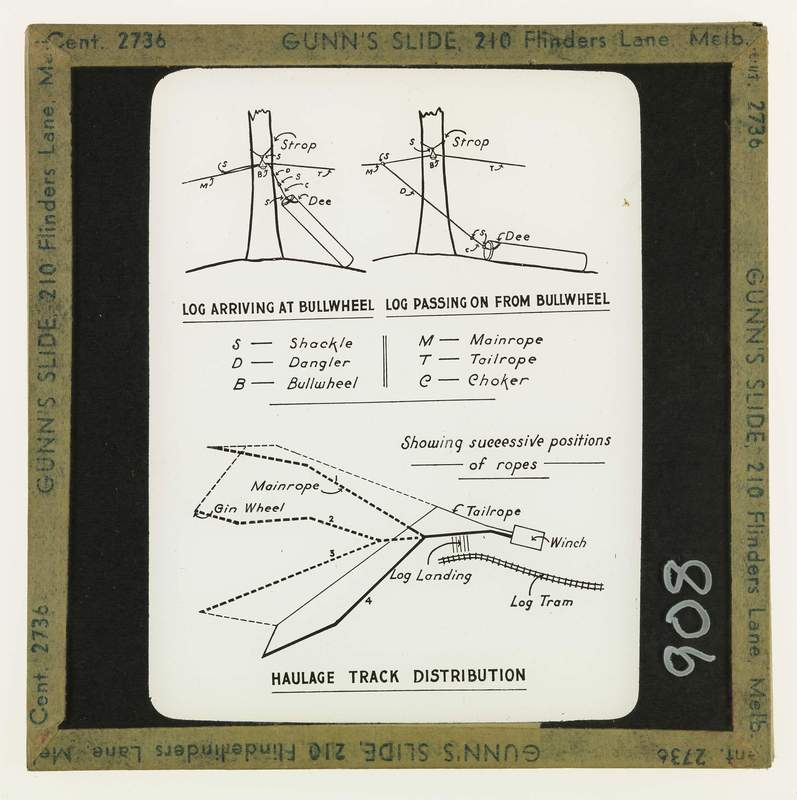
Cable logging terms

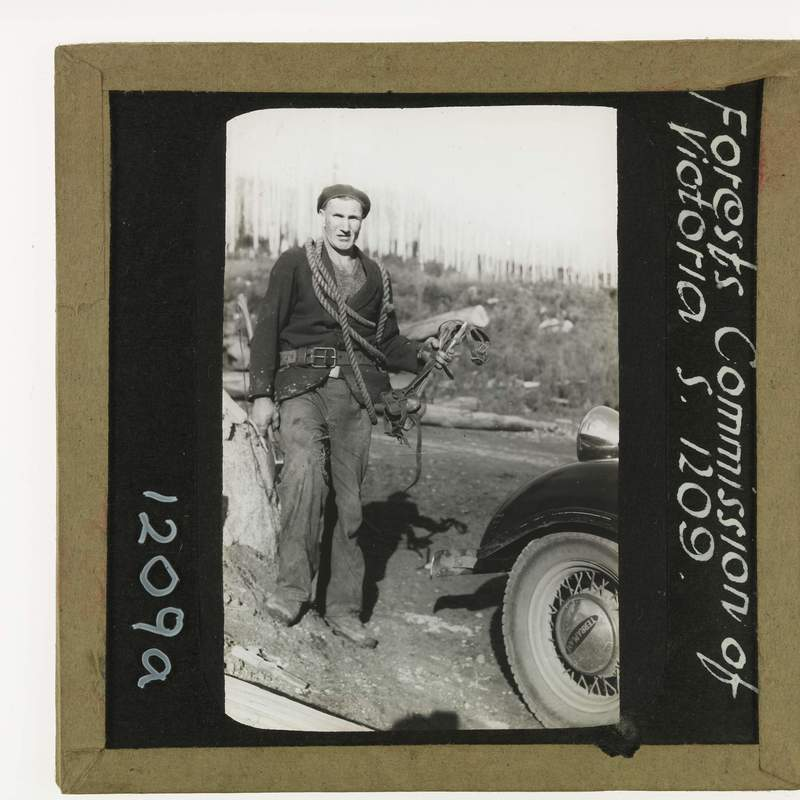
Charlie Wall - high lead climber

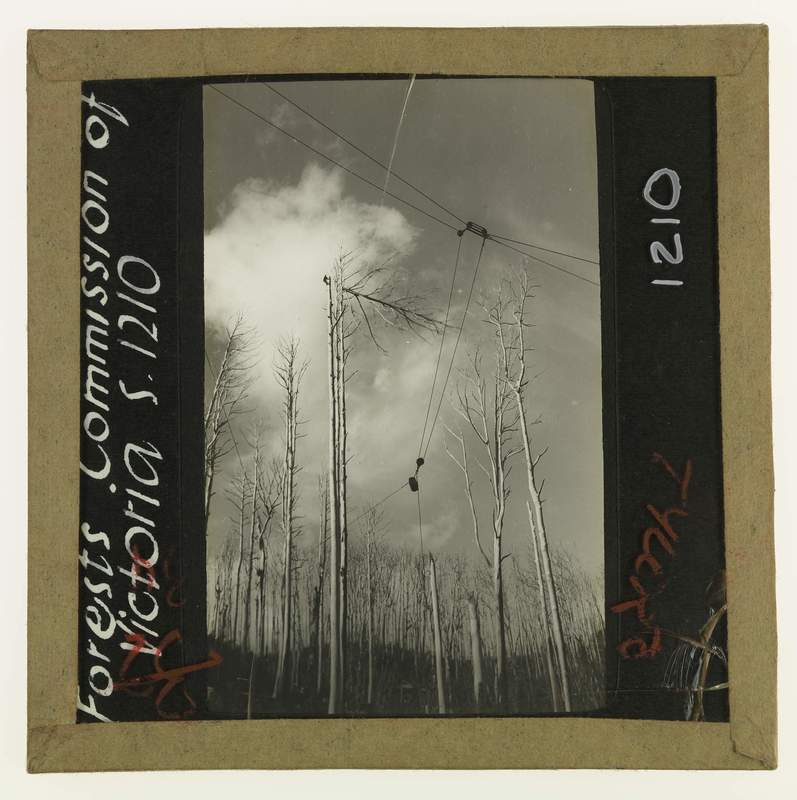
Tree topping to prepare cables

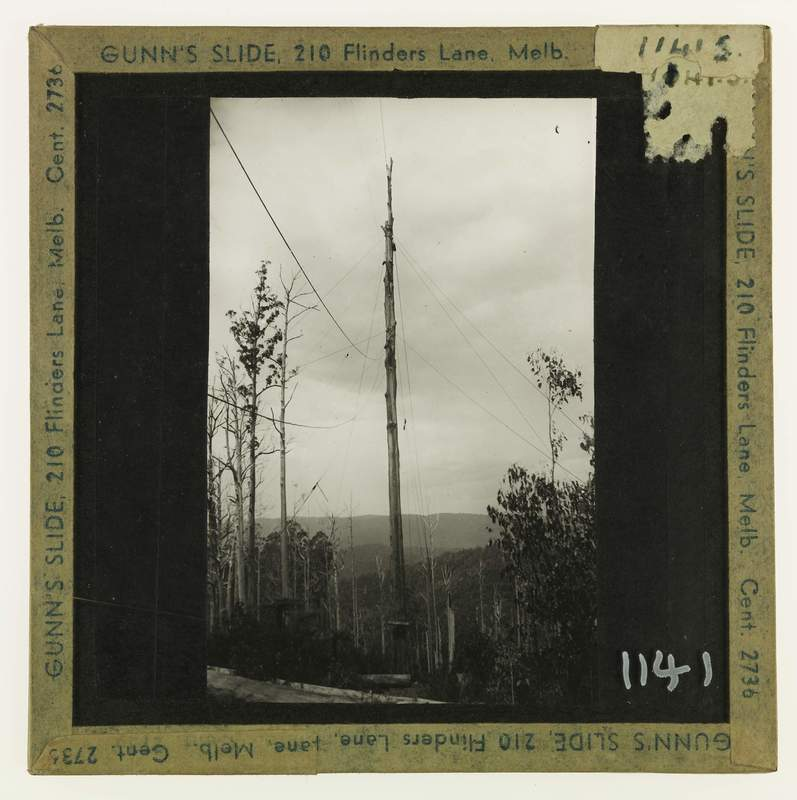
Cable logging ropeway - Thomson valley

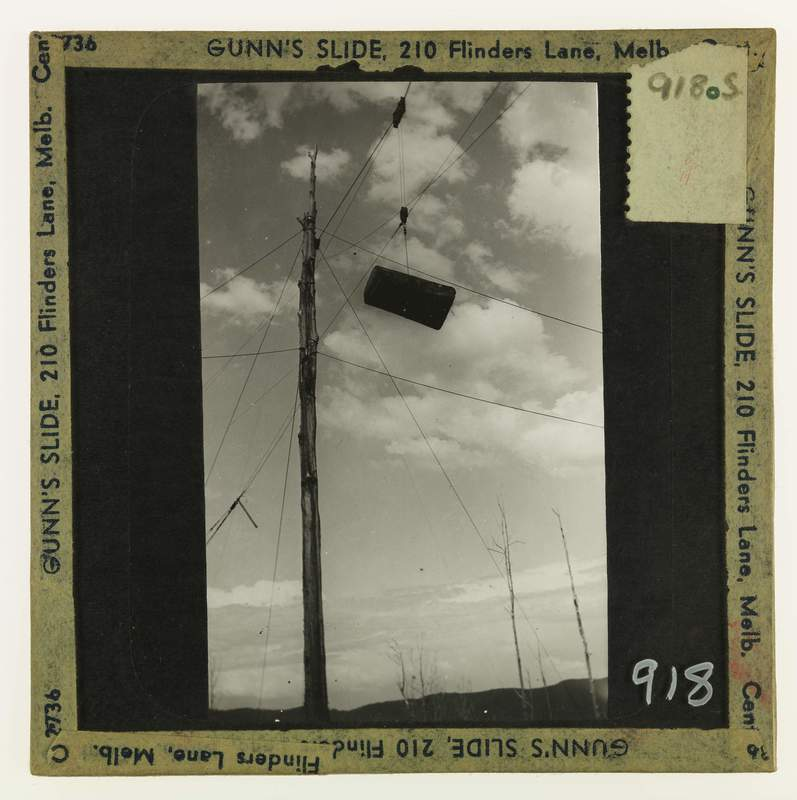
Cable logging

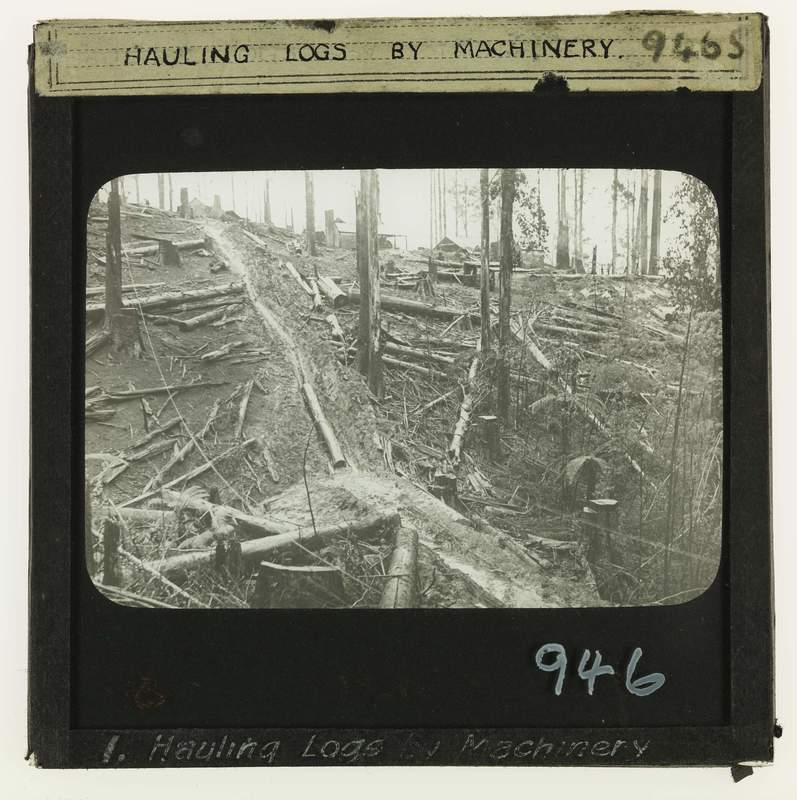
Snigging logs with steam winch

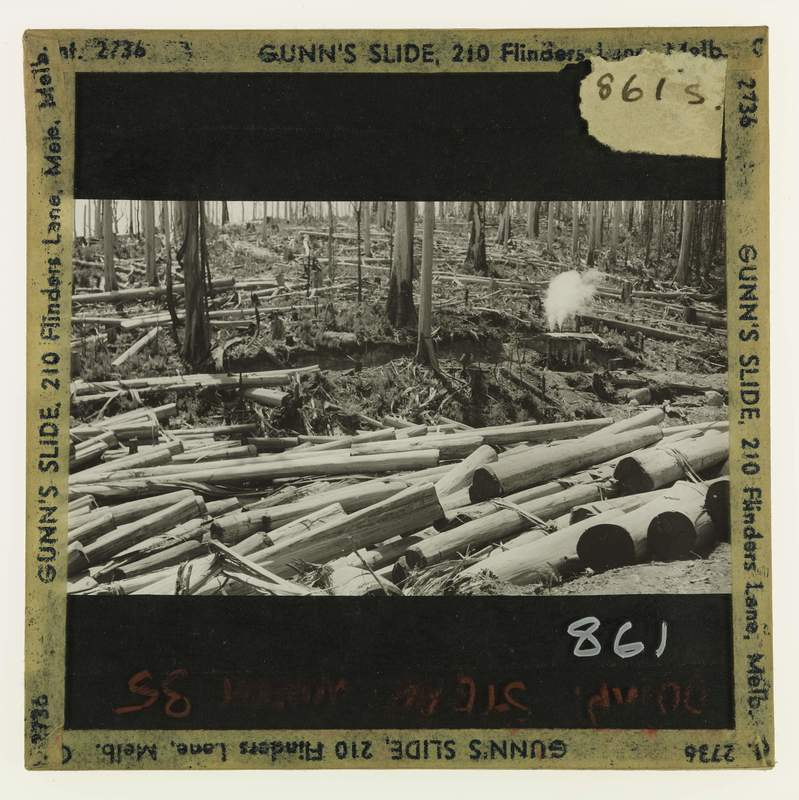
Log dump operated by steam winch at Saxton's Mill- East Tanjil

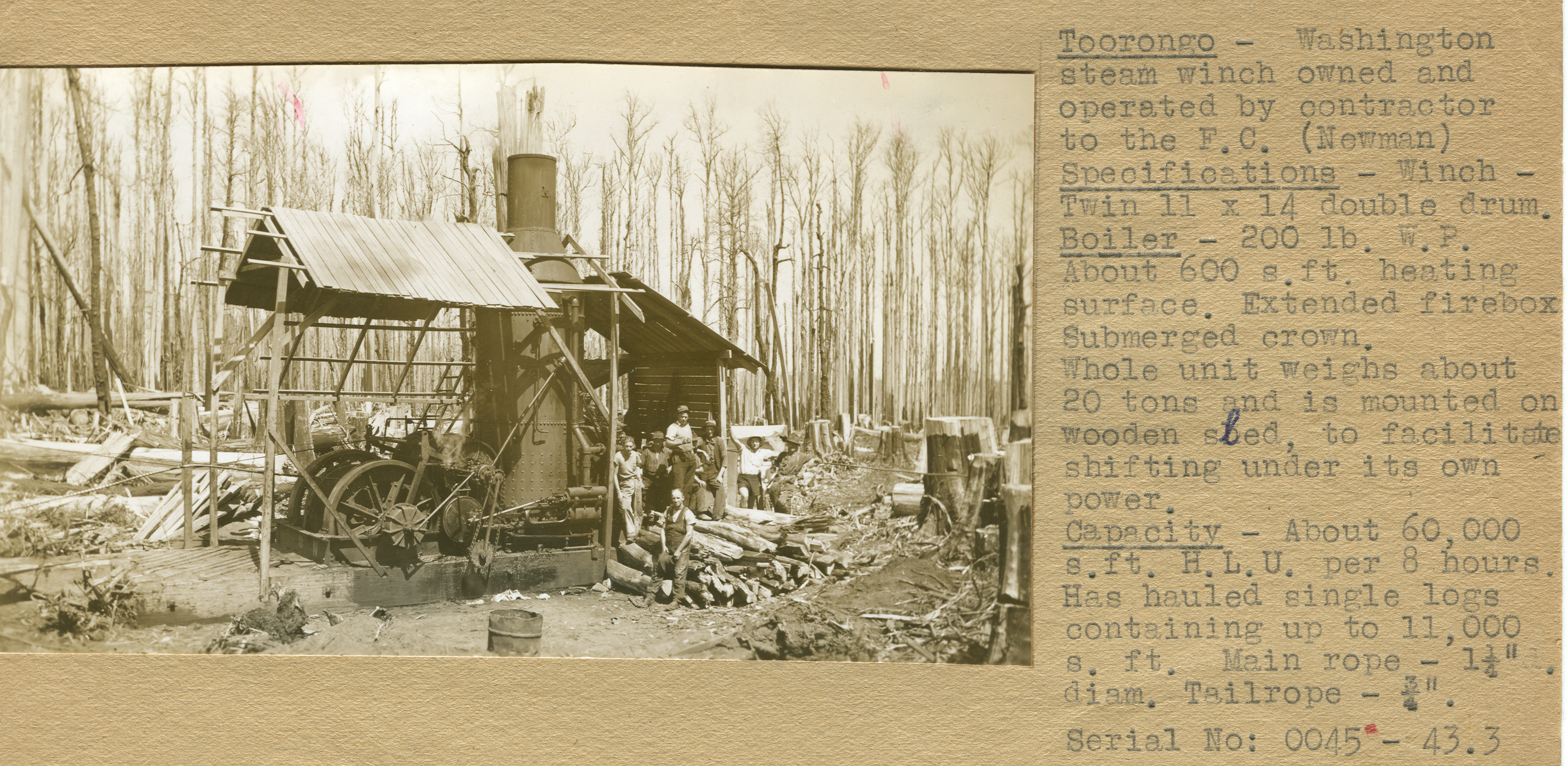
The winch during 1939 bushfires timber salvage operations. Photo includes machine specifications, c. 1941

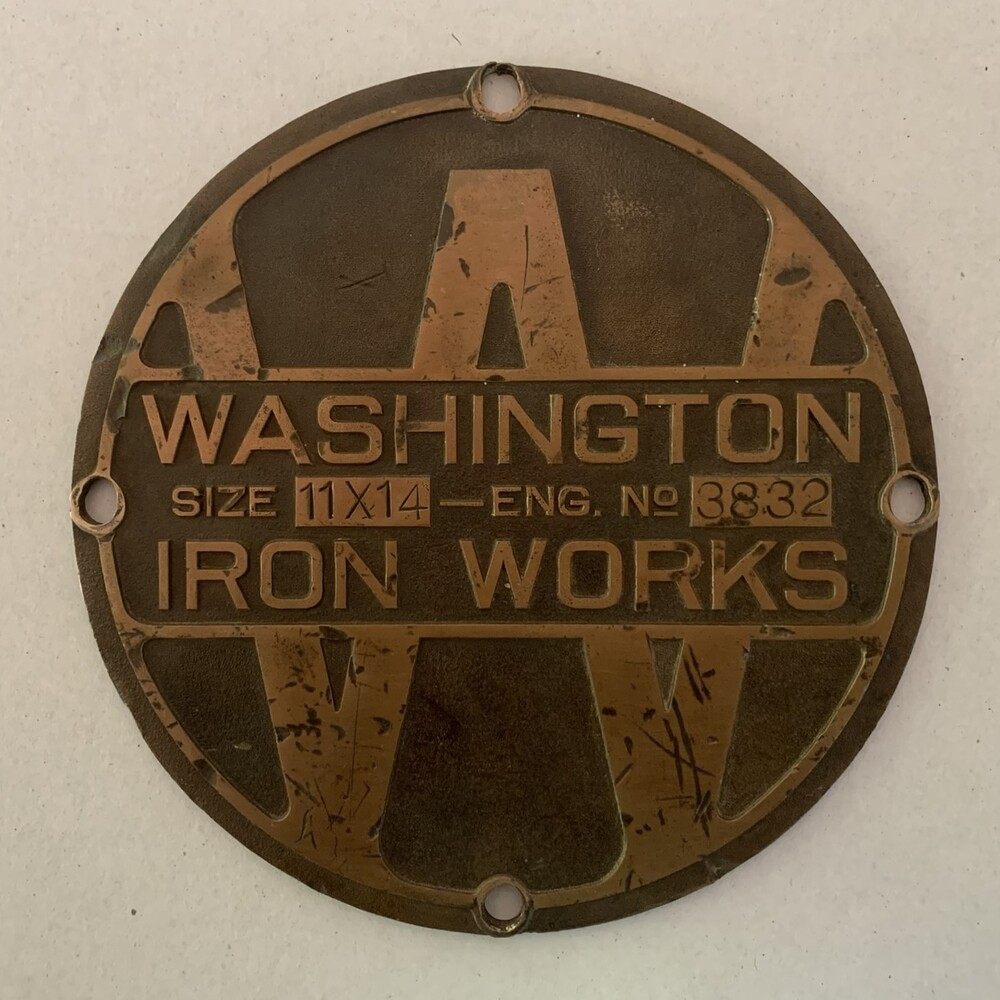
Washington winch brass boiler plate

== See also ==
- Old Federal Mill
- Timber industry in Australia
