= Physical activity epidemiology =

Study of physical activity/inactivity

Physical activity epidemiology is the study, in human populations, of the frequencies, distributions, and dynamics of physical activity or inactivity.

Physical activity is defined as any voluntary body movement requiring energy expenditure produced by skeletal muscles. Insufficient physical activity is defined as physical inactivity. Sufficient physical activity is defined as adults having at least 150 minutes of moderate physical activity, or at least 75 minutes of vigorous physical activity per week, or any combination of the two. Insufficient physical activity would hence be defined as the inability to meet the aforementioned WHO recommendations. Insufficient physical activity has been linked to several chronic diseases and premature deaths as compared to sufficient physical activity.

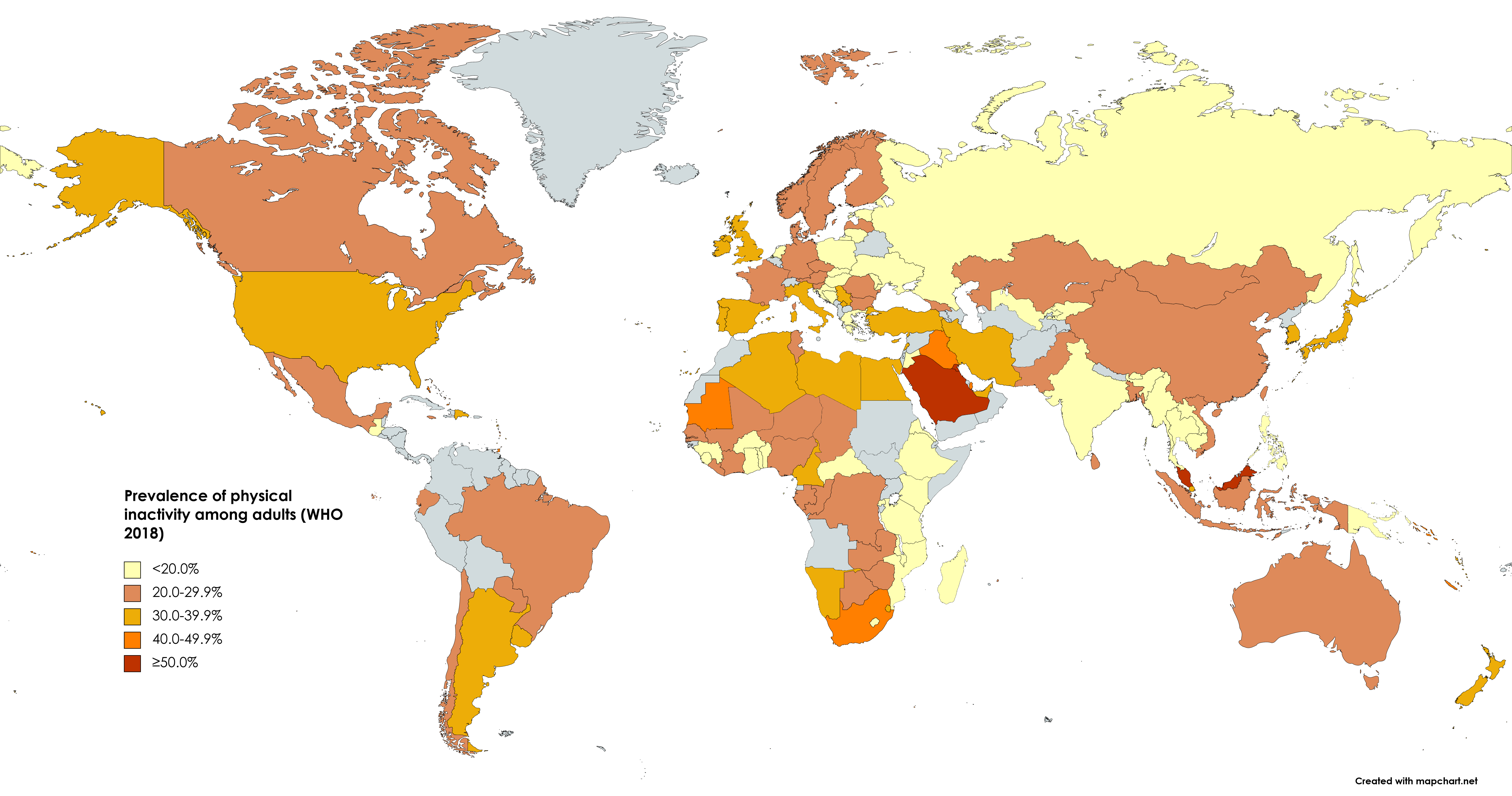
Prevalence of physical inactivity among adults by country

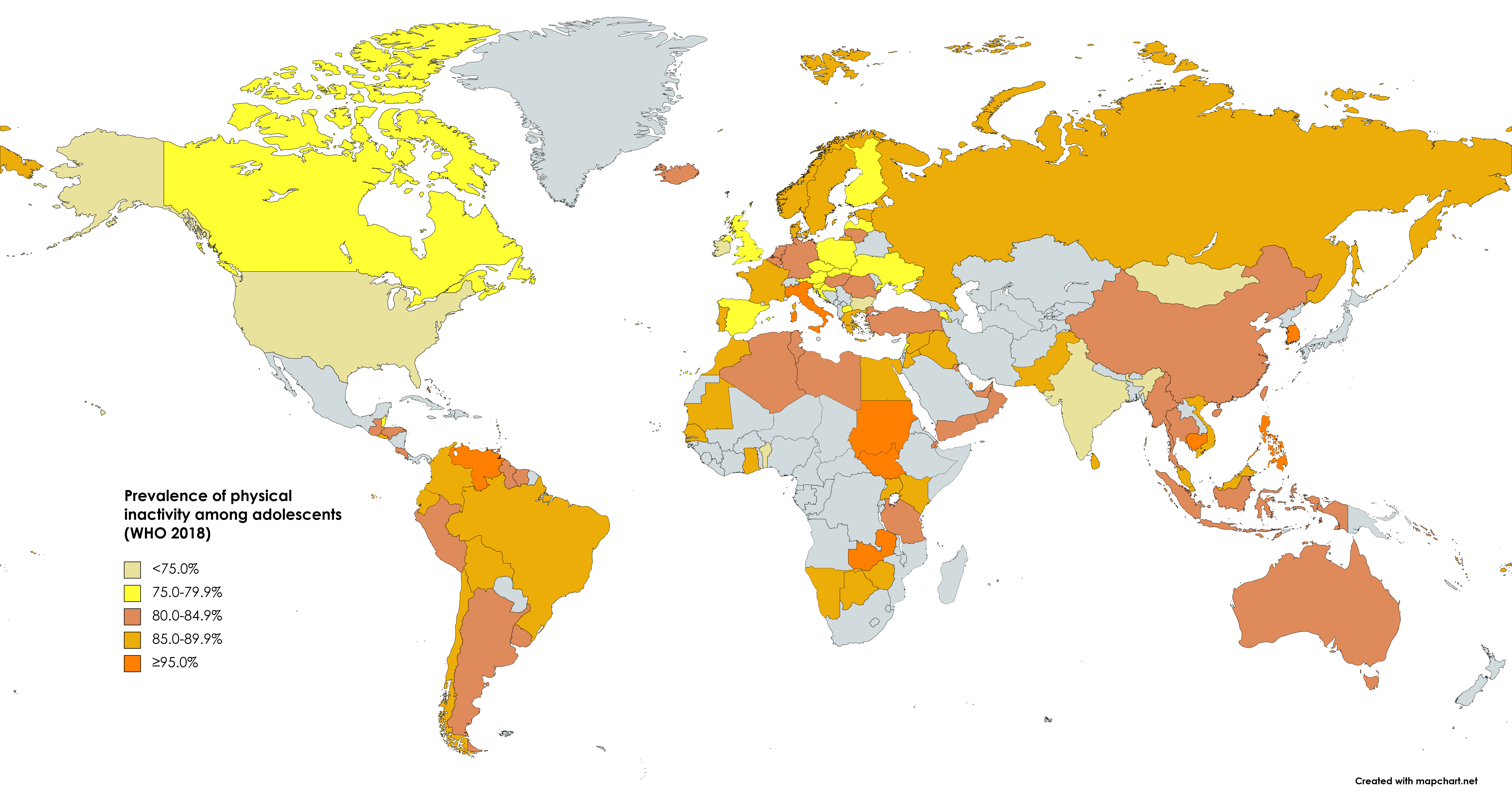
Prevalence of physical inactivity among adolescents by country

Globally, physical inactivity was seen in 23% of men and 32% of women over 18. Physical inactivity levels have remained relatively constant throughout the years, with only a 1% decrease from 2001 to 2016. As of 2016, Kuwait had the highest prevalence of physical inactivity of 67%, while Uganda had the lowest prevalence of physical inactivity of 5.5%, i.e. Uganda was the most physically active country, and Kuwait is the least physically active country in the world.

Since physical activity levels can be measured through many means, including questionnaires, accelerometers, pedometers, calorimetry and direct observation, statistics on the epidemiology of physical activity vary between sources. Survey questionnaires are the most frequently used method of measuring physical activity worldwide, making it easier to compare across countries to obtain physical activity epidemiology.

== Africa and the Mediterranean ==
African countries generally have higher levels of physical activity compared to other continents. Countries in Sub-Saharan Africa have a higher prevalence of sufficient physical activity than the Mediterranean.

The prevalence of physical activity in Sub-Saharan African countries is 78.6% overall, with 82.1% and 75.2% prevalence of sufficient physical activity in adult men and women respectively.

The prevalence of sufficient physical activity in Mediterranean countries is 61.2%, with 74.1% and 60.1% prevalence of sufficient physical activity in adult males and females respectively.

=== Algeria ===
The prevalence of physical activity in Algerian adults is 66%. The prevalence of sufficient physical activity in adult Algerian males and females is 72% and 59% respectively.

In 2011, it was found that 20.7% of Algerian adolescents aged 13–15 were sufficiently physically active, following the standard of having at least 60 minutes of physical activity per day for 5 or more days a week. Algerian boys and Algerian girls had 31.5% and 11.0% prevalence of sufficient physical activity.

=== Ghana ===
84% of Ghana adults were sufficiently physically active, and men and women had 87% and 82% prevalence of sufficient physical activity respectively.

=== Kenya ===
81% of Kenyan adults were sufficiently physically active, and men and women had 83% and 79% prevalence of sufficient physical activity respectively.

=== Nigeria ===
The prevalence of sufficient physical activity in Nigeria is 78%, with 79% and 76% prevalence of sufficient physical activity in adult males and females respectively.

=== South Africa ===
The prevalence of sufficient physical activity in South Africa is 53%, with 58% and 43% prevalence of sufficient physical activity in adult males and females respectively.

=== Uganda ===
Uganda is the most physically active country of the world, with 94.5% physical activity as of 2016.

== Asia ==
In general, Asian countries have decreasing prevalence of activity due to mechanization of work and transport and the spread of sedentary lifestyle. The prevalence of obesity and physical inactivity are both generally high in Asia at around 60%, with Saudi Arabia with the lowest physical activity in the world at 39%.

=== China ===
Physical activity prevalence in China is at 76%, with 78% in men and 78% in women. Statistically recorder physical activity of men is usually higher than that of women, but the data shows similar activity level between two sexes in China. This is possibly due to the family culture, which the wife is responsible for domestic work, accounting for a certain level of physical activity of female in China.

=== Japan ===
The prevalence of physical activity in Japan is 66%, with 69% in males and 64% in females.

=== South Korea ===
The prevalence of sufficient physical activity in Korea is 67%, with 71% in males and 62% in females.

=== Nepal ===
In 2003, physical activity prevalence in adults was 25.5% in males and 8.8% in females. The level of physical activity increased rapidly from 2003 to 2016; as of 2016, Nepal had the highest physical activity among all Asian countries at 86.6%.

=== Saudi Arabia ===
The prevalence of physical activity in Saudi Arabia is 54.1% for male and 34.9% for females.

== Europe ==
The prevalence of physical activity in Europe is 76.6%, with 78% prevalence in males and 73.3% prevalence in females. Moldova has the highest physical activity of 88.5%, and Serbia has the lowest prevalence at 60.5%.

=== England ===
59% of the population of England is sufficiently physically active, with 67% of men and 55% of women being physically active.

=== Finland ===
77% of the Finnish population is physically active, with 78% and 75% of sufficiently active men and women respectively.

=== France ===
In France, 76% of the population is physically active. 81% of men and 72% of women are sufficiently physically active.

=== Germany ===
The prevalence of sufficient physical activity in Germany is 79%, with 81% among men and 77% among women.

=== Moldova ===
The prevalence of physical activity in Moldova is the highest, at 87.5%, with 88% prevalence in men and 87% prevalence in women. The World Health Organisation has been cooperating with schools in Moldova by teaching school children about the importance of adequate physical activity.

=== The Netherlands ===
In the Netherlands, 61% of the population is physically active, with 63% of men and 60% of women being sufficiently physically active.

=== Serbia ===
In Serbia, the overall prevalence of physical activity is 60.5%, with 67% and 56% of sufficiently active men and women respectively.

== Latin America and the Caribbean ==
The prevalence of sufficient physical activity in Latin America and the Caribbean is 60.9%, with 65.7% activity in males and 56.3% activity in females. Dominica has the highest prevalence of physical activity at 78.4%, and Brazil has the lowest physical activity at 53%.

=== Argentina ===
58.4% of Argentina’s population is physically active, with 62.4% of men and 54.7% of women being sufficiently physically active.

=== Bahamas ===
56.7% of the population in the Bahamas is physically active, with 70% of men and 44.4% of female being physically active.

=== Brazil ===
In Brazil, 59.6% of adult men and 46.7% of adult women are physically active. In general, 53% of its population is measured to be physically active.

=== Chile ===
Chile has a relatively high physical activity among other Latin American countries, with 73.4% of its population being sufficiently physically active. 75.6% of men and 71.4% of women are physically active in Chile.

== Oceania and the Pacific ==
=== Australia ===
69.6% of Australia’s adult population is physically active, with 73% of men and 66.4% of women being sufficiently physically active.

=== New Zealand ===
The general physical activity in New Zealand is relatively low, with 57.6% of adults being physically active. 60.7% of men and 54.7% of women have been measured as sufficiently physically active.

=== Fiji ===
Physical activity in Fiji is relatively high, with 83.4% of its adult population is physically active. 82.8% of men and 84% of women are physically active and the difference between 2 sexes is very small as compared to other countries.

=== United States ===
60% of adult citizens in the USA are physically active, with 68.3% of men and 52% of women being sufficiently active.

== Factors Affecting Level of Physical Activity ==
=== Personal ===
Personal factors, including, age, genotype, gender, race and ethnicity, are fixed in every person, and influence one’s physical activity capacity.

=== Environmental ===
The built environment, which includes availability of green spaces, walkability and recreation centres plays a role in the physical activity levels of individuals. In urban areas, walkability is affected by ease of access of walking paths, availability of shade and safety.

=== Socioeconomic ===
Technological innovations reduce physical demands of work, home and travel. On the other hand, leisure time is increased and more higher-intensity physical activity can be carried out. Suburbanisation of both population and employment in lower density communities increase reliance on private vehicles hence lower physical activity for transportation.

== See also ==
- Lack of physical activity
