= National Mortality Followback Survey =

National epidemiological survey in the United States

The National Mortality Followback Survey is a survey conducted multiple times in the United States as part of a program that was started by the National Center for Health Statistics in the 1960s. The survey gathers information on Americans who died in a given year from their death certificates and family members (or others who are familiar with the decedent's life history.) The first NMFS was conducted in 1961, and focused on, among other topics, institutional and hospital care people received in the last year of their life. Subsequent surveys were conducted in 1962-3, 1964-5, 1966-8, 1986, and 1993. As of 2009, it is conducted by the National Vital Statistics System.
