= Old Federal Mill =

Heritage-listed former sawmill in Melbourne, Victoria, Australia

- Location of the former sawmill in Victoria
- Interactive map of the Old Federal Mill area

General information
- Status: Completed
- Type: Sawmill remnants
- Location: Big Creek Road, McMahons Creek, Yarra Ranges, Melbourne, Victoria, Australia
- Coordinates: 37°48′14″S 145°52′53″E
- Completed: 1922; 104 years ago
- Closed: 1950 (abandoned)
- Owner: Federal Timber Company

Technical details
- Material: Timber; concrete; steel; glass; ceramics; bricks

Design and construction
- Engineer: Jack Corbett

Victorian Heritage Register
- Official name: Old Federal Mill
- Type: Registered place
- Designated: 17 June 1999
- Reference no.: H1822
- Heritage overlay no.: HO104
- Category: Forestry and Timber Industry

Register of the National Estate
- Official name: Old Federal Mill
- Type: Defunct register
- Designated: undated

The Old Federal Mill is a former sawmill site of which only remnants remain, located on Big Creek Road in McMahons Creek, in the Yarra Ranges, in the north eastern suburbs of Melbourne, in Victoria, Australia. The sawmill operated from 1922 until 1950 and the site lies within the proposed Great Forest National Park.

Built on the traditional lands of the Wurundjeri people, the former sawmill site was added to the Victorian Heritage Register on 17 June 1999 in recognition of its archaeological and historical significance; and was also added to the non-statutory and now defunct Register of the National Estate on an unknown date.

== History ==
The Old Federal Mill was built in 1922 at Starvation Creek, by the Federal Timber Company, (Note: Also called Federal Timber Products.) associated with the Federal Cask Company of Footscray. It was a large operation for the time, capable of cutting 35 cubic metres (15,000 bd ft) of timber per day, in the form of barrel staves and scantling.

The Old Federal Mill was managed by a French Canadian, Jack Corbett, who introduced North American methods of cable logging, including 'skyline' and 'highlead' winching, and multi-drum Washington winches – of which four were in use during the mill's operation. This technology enabled extremely rough country and steep gullies to be successfully logged, and was later taken up by other Victorian sawmills.

North American-style wider gauge tramways were also introduced, increasing in size from the usual Victorian 910-millimetre (3 ft) or 1,070-millimetre (3 ft 6 in) gauge, to a wider 1,200-millimetre (4 ft) gauge. This enabled larger loads of logs to be carried, while stability was retained. The Federal Timber Company also substituted winches and rail tractors for horses on their tramways, to cut down on manpower. The mill shifted to the watershed of the Little Ada River in 1934, after cutting all available timber at Starvation Creek.

The sawmill closed in 1950, and the site was subsequently abandoned.

== Description ==
There are no standing buildings at this site. The Old Federal Mill contains the remnants of a technologically innovative sawmill, including concrete machinery foundations, three sawdust heaps, steam winch components, a skyline carriage and modified tram wheels. Timber was despatched to Warburton along the Starvation Creek outlet tramway, remains of which include earthworks, and two large pig-sty bridges. Extensive artefact scatters associated with the mill settlement are distributed along the outlet tramway north of the mill, including glass, ceramics, bricks and metal.

The mill shed itself is well defined by remnant posts or post moulds, concrete foundations associated with the breaking-down bench mechanism and steam engine, and a deep trench for the flywheel and belting which drove the mill. The mill layout differs slightly from that of most mills, due to the fact that it was predominantly cutting barrel staves. A small section of barrel stave saw blade was found near the blacksmith's shop, on the western side of the mill. Two log frameworks are situated north of the mill. The one with the heaviest foundation probably represents the initial position of the mill's logging winch. Two other frameworks are located to the east of the mill, but their function is unknown. Three sawdust heaps are on the periphery of the mill, with one featuring the remains of blower ducting on its flanks, indicating the use of a mechanical dust extraction system. The sawdust heap to the north is served by a short wooden railed tramway. South of the mill a small group of logging artefacts include a skyline carriage, the remains of a steam logging winch drum, and a set of gauge modified tramway wheels.

The associated tramways add to the interpretation of the mill site. The outlet tramway is easily followed from Big Creek Road, although it is thickly overgrown in places. The two large pig-sty style bridges (in decayed condition) cross creeks before the mill is reached. The larger of these has eight pig-sty supports and is over 100 metres (330 ft) long. Also along the outlet tramway are remnant features include stumps and piles of chimney bricks from several former buildings sites, and large bottle dumps and china scatters relating to a substantial former settlement north of Federal Creek. The bridge formations and remnant sleepers indicate that the outlet tramway had a 914-millimetre (3 ft) gauge, the same as that of the Starvation Creek tramway which carried the sawn timber to Warburton. Around the mill site the tramways are more difficult to follow with only shallow sleeper impressions to indicate their route. Two log tramways extended into the bush to the north of the mill, and two possible routes also went south from the mill.

The Old Federal Mill is archaeologically significant for the comparative intactness of its remains which demonstrate the innovative technology originally employed at this mill. The site is also significant for its potential to yield artefacts and evidence relating to the cultural history of sawmilling settlements.

== See also ==
- Timber industry in Australia
- List of places on the Victorian Heritage Register in the Shire of Yarra Ranges
