= List of colleges and universities in Washington (state) =

This is a list of colleges and universities in Washington, including other educational institutions providing higher education.

== Public institutions ==
=== Four-year universities ===
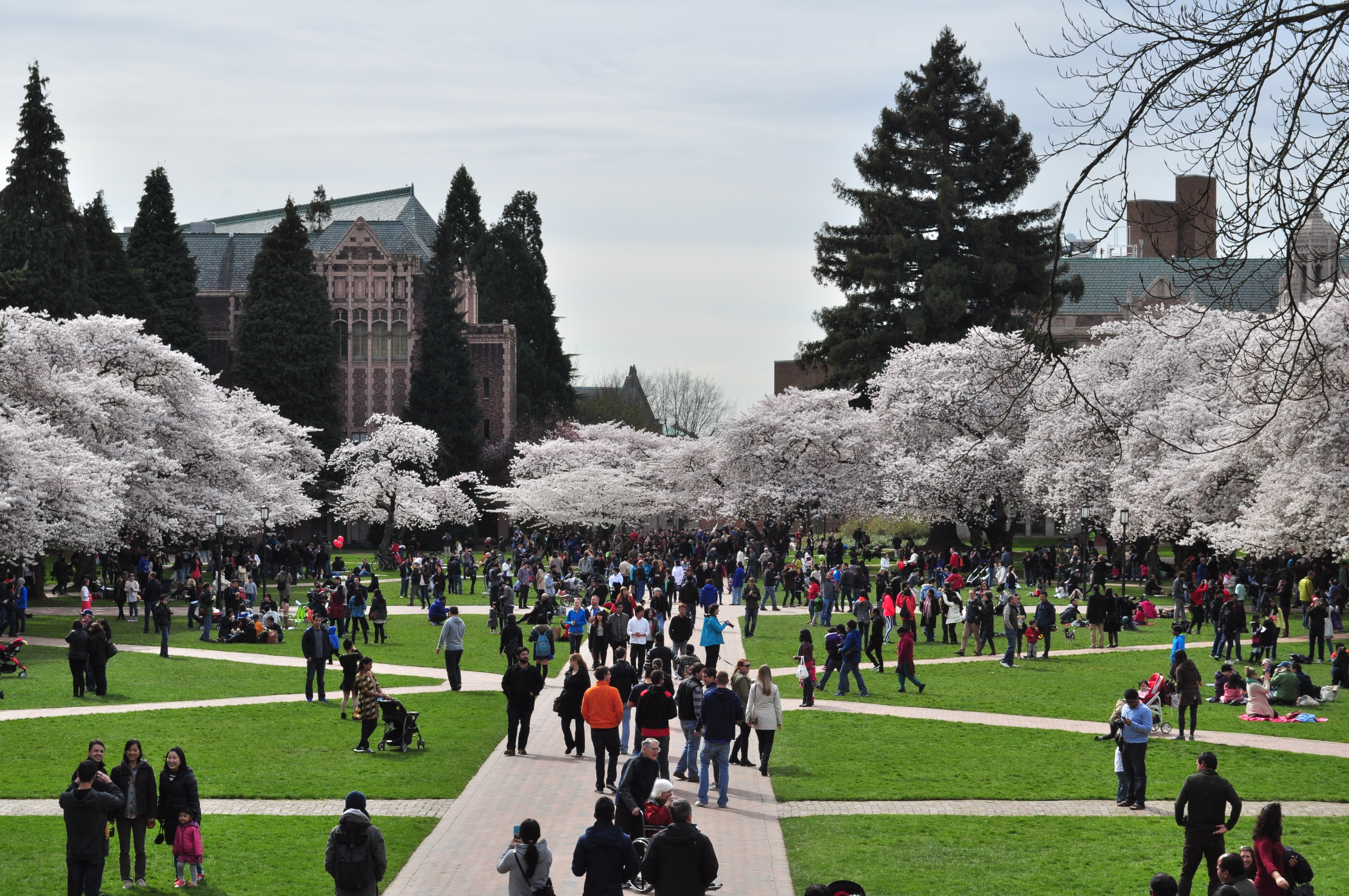
The Quad at the University of Washington

List of colleges and universities in Washington (state) (Washington (state))

Name	Founded	Type	Enrollment (Fall 2024)	Location	Other branches
University of Washington	1861	Public	68,020	Seattle	Bothell, Tacoma, Spokane, Rome campus, León campus
Washington State University	1890	Public	25,685	Pullman	Spokane, Tri-Cities, Vancouver, Everett Puyallup agricultural campus, Global Campus
Western Washington University	1893	Public	14,710	Bellingham	Anacortes, Bremerton, Everett, Port Angeles, Poulsbo
Eastern Washington University	1882	Public	10,492	Cheney	Bellevue, Everett, Spokane
Central Washington University	1891	Public	10,811	Ellensburg	Des Moines, Everett, Lynnwood, Moses Lake, Pierce County, Sammamish, Wenatchee, Yakima
Evergreen State College	1967	Public	2,490	Olympia	Aberdeen, Tacoma

=== Two-year colleges ===
- Bates Technical College, Tacoma
- Bellevue College, Bellevue
- Bellingham Technical College, Bellingham
- Big Bend Community College, Moses Lake
- Cascadia College, Bothell
- Centralia College, Centralia
- Clark College, Vancouver
- Clover Park Technical College, Lakewood
- Columbia Basin College
  - Pasco
  - Richland
- Community Colleges of Spokane
  - Spokane Community College, Spokane
  - Spokane Falls Community College, Spokane
- Edmonds College, Lynnwood
- Everett Community College, Everett
- Grays Harbor College, Aberdeen
  - Columbia Education Center, Ilwaco
  - Riverview Education Center, Raymond
- Green River College
  - Auburn
  - Enumclaw
  - Kent
- Highline College
  - Des Moines
  - Federal Way
- Lake Washington Institute of Technology
  - Kirkland
  - Redmond
- Lower Columbia College, Longview
- Olympic College
  - Bremerton
  - Poulsbo
  - Shelton
- Peninsula College
  - Port Angeles
  - Port Townsend
  - Forks
- Pierce College
  - Pierce College Fort Steilacoom, Lakewood
  - Pierce College Puyallup, Puyallup
- Renton Technical College, Renton
- Seattle Colleges District (formerly Seattle Community Colleges)
  - North Seattle College, Seattle
  - Seattle Central College, Seattle
  - South Seattle College, Seattle
- Shoreline Community College, Shoreline
- Skagit Valley College, Mount Vernon
- South Puget Sound Community College
  - Olympia
  - Lacey
- Tacoma Community College, Tacoma
- Walla Walla Community College
  - Walla Walla
  - Clarkston
- Wenatchee Valley College
  - Wenatchee
  - Omak
- Whatcom Community College, Bellingham
- Yakima Valley College
  - Yakima
  - Grandview

==== Tribal institutions ====
- Northwest Indian College, Bellingham, Washington

== Private institutions ==
=== Four-year institutions ===
Name	Founded	Type	Enrollment (Fall 2024)	Location
Antioch University	1852	Private	771	Seattle
City University of Seattle	1973	Private	2,007	Seattle
Gonzaga University	1887	Private	7,470	Spokane
Northwest University	1934	Private	2,405	Kirkland
Pacific Lutheran University	1890	Private	2,797	Tacoma
Saint Martin's University	1895	Private	1,390	Lacey
Seattle Pacific University	1891	Private	2,261	Seattle
Seattle University	1891	Private	7,694	Seattle
University of Puget Sound	1888	Private	1,864	Tacoma
Walla Walla University	1892	Private	1,426	College Place
Whitman College	1859	Private	1,561	Walla Walla
Whitworth University	1890	Private	2,459	Spokane

=== Two-year institutions ===
- Carrington College, Spokane
- Northwest School of Wooden Boat Building, Port Hadlock
- Pacific Northwest Christian College, Kennewick
- Perry Technical Institute, Yakima
- Pima Medical Institute, Renton and Seattle
- School of Visual Concepts, Seattle

=== Other private colleges and universities ===
- Bastyr University, Kenmore
- Columbia College (Missouri) extended campuses
  - Naval Station Everett in Marysville
  - NAS Whidbey Island in Oak Harbor
- DigiPen Institute of Technology, Redmond
- Faith International University & Seminary, Tacoma
- Heritage University, Toppenish
- Moody Bible Institute, Spokane
- Northeastern University, Seattle Campus, Seattle
- Northwest College of Art & Design, Tacoma
- Pacific Northwest University of Health Sciences, Yakima
- Seattle Bible College, Seattle
- Seattle Film Institute, Seattle
- Seattle Institute of East Asian Medicine, Seattle
- The Seattle School of Theology & Psychology, Seattle

=== Defunct private colleges and universities ===
- Adelphia College, Seattle
- Argosy University, Seattle, Seattle
- The Art Institute of Seattle, Seattle
- Cornish College of the Arts, Seattle - acquired by Seattle University
- Griffin College, Seattle
- Northwest Theological Seminary, Lynnwood
- Pinchot University, Seattle
- Henry Cogswell College, Everett
- Interface College, Spokane
- Seattle Vocational Institute, Seattle
- Trinity Lutheran College, Seattle
- Washington Technology University, Bellevue

== See also ==
- Higher education in the United States
- List of college athletic programs in Washington (state)
- List of American institutions of higher education
- List of recognized higher education accreditation organizations
- List of colleges and universities
- List of colleges and universities by country
