= Healthiest State in the Nation Campaign =

Public health campaign in Washington, United States

The Healthiest State in the Nation Campaign was a statewide public health initiative launched in Washington State in 2004 by the Washington Health Foundation (WHF), a Seattle-based nonprofit organization. The campaign’s goal was to improve the overall health of Washington residents and to raise the state's national health ranking to first place in the United States.

The campaign was officially launched on September 18, 2004. In 2012, the Washington Health Foundation suspended major operations, including the campaign, after exhausting its funding.

== History ==
When Washington dropped out of America's Health Rankings' top ten in its 2003 national report, the WHF began to channel its efforts towards major reform in healthcare for the state.

== Campaign ==
In an attempt to educate and engage the people of Washington on health issues, the Healthiest State in the Nation campaign was created as a long-term civic engagement effort. Using the United Health Foundation's America's Health Rankings model as a guide, the Healthiest State Campaign was developed around six action areas, each with two health measures used in determining the state's health rank. The campaign attempted to improve these areas through civic engagement while emphasizing the importance of personal responsibility and collective action in making Washington a healthier state.

Healthiest State Campaign Action Areas and Measures
Action Areas	Measures
Promoting community health	Promoting economic well-being, raising the high school graduation rate
Investing in preventative care	Insuring for preventative care, investing in public health systems
Increasing investment in health services	Health Home, improving medical care quality
Protecting against injury & disease	Use of proven preventive care, preventing injury and violence
Avoiding addictions	Discouraging smoking and drinking
Engaging in healthy habits	Engaging in physical activity and proper nutrition

=== Launch and beyond ===
In 2005, the campaign launched a quarterly magazine, Thrive!, which reached an initial statewide circulation of 150,000 copies distributed through libraries, universities, and hospitals. The publication provided resources on healthy lifestyles and featured local figures, such as Suzy Preston, a winner of NBC's The Biggest Loser, and former Seattle Seahawks player Shaun Alexander.

The campaign began to focus on the political aspects of health in 2006, developing a priority list and working with the Washington State Legislature to produce laws and policies to improve Washington's health.

In 2007, Washington State's health rank climbed from 15th to 12th, becoming one of five states to earn the title of "Most Improved State." Washington was ranked 10th on the WHF's 2008 Report Card.

=== Healthiest State xChange ===
In 2010, the WHF unveiled the Healthiest State xChange and implemented the first steps of its launch in 2011. The program provided free support for consumers and businesses to help purchase and manage health insurance plans. The service also encouraged users to make the WHF their insurance broker of record, after which the WHF would charge a commission for its services.

The program was established as a revenue source for the WHF, which had depleted its financial reserves. In 2012, the WHF concluded that the program's income would be insufficient to cover operational expenses. In 2013, the WHF wound down its major operations, sold the xChange program to a private insurance broker, and subsequently suspended it.
