= Conduplicato corpore =

Medical condition

Conduplicato corpore is a condition that occurs during birth if the fetus is quite small and the pelvis is large. Spontaneous delivery may occur despite persistence of the abnormal lie.

In such cases, the fetus is compressed with the head forced against the abdomen. A portion of the thoracic wall below the shoulder thus becomes the most dependent part, appearing at the vulva. The head and thorax then pass through the pelvic cavity at the same time, and the fetus, which is doubled upon itself (Conduplicato Corpore), is expelled. Such a mechanism is obviously possible only in the case of very small infant and occasionally when the second preterm fetus in a twin pregnancy is born.
