= Foundation for Early Learning =

- Founded: 2000
- Founder: Mona Lee Locke
- Purpose: Early Childhood Development
- Location: Seattle, Washington
- Region served: Washington State
- Method: Coalition Grants & Technical Assistance
- Key people: Mona Locke, Founder Jeanne Anderson, Founding Executive Director Vaughnetta J. Barton, Executive Director
- Employees: 7
- Website: www.earlylearning.org

Foundation for Early Learning is a non-profit organization that is dedicated to supporting early childhood development from birth through age five. Founded by Mona Lee Locke, the Foundation grew out of former Washington Governor Gary Locke's Commission on Early Learning and was started with a $10 million gift from Bill and Melinda Gates Foundation. Since its establishment, the Foundation has invested over $7 million in early learning programs and networks in Washington state. The organization merged with Thrive By Five WA.
