= Seattle Institute of East Asian Medicine =

Private graduate college in Seattle, Washington

- Other name: SIEAM
- Type: Private graduate college
- Established: 1996
- President: Craig Mitchell
- Dean: Katherine Taromina
- Faculty: 23
- Administrative staff: 8
- Postgraduates: 19
- Doctoral students: 6
- Location: Seattle, Washington, United States
- Website: www.sieam.edu

The Seattle Institute of East Asian Medicine (SIEAM, formerly the Seattle Institute of Oriental Medicine) is a private graduate college in Seattle, Washington. It is accredited by the Accreditation Commission for Acupuncture and Herbal Medicine and authorized by the Washington Higher Education Coordinating Board to award the degrees of Master of Acupuncture and Oriental Medicine, Master of Acupuncture, and Doctor of Acupuncture and Herbal Medicine. SIEAM's educational programs offer training in acupuncture, tui na, shiatsu, Chinese herbal medicine, and Chinese medical language.

SIEAM operates a teaching clinic and herbal dispensary where graduate students both observe faculty practitioners and practice under faculty supervisors.
