= Washington State Department of Information Services =

Agency that provided IT assistance

Washington State Department of Information Services (DIS)

Agency overview
- Formed: 1987; 39 years ago
- Dissolved: 2011
- Superseding agency: Department of Enterprise Services (DES)
- Jurisdiction: State of Washington
- Headquarters: Olympia, Washington
- Agency executive: Tony Tortorice, Director, Washington State Chief Information Officer
- Website: des.wa.gov

The Washington State Department of Information Services (DIS) was a Governor's Cabinet-level agency that provided information technology assistance to state and local agencies, school districts, tribal organizations, and qualifying nonprofit groups in Washington.

The Legislature created DIS in 1987 from the consolidation of the state's four independent data processing and communications systems. The agency employed nearly 450 workers who provide more than 100 technology services. It merged into the Department of Enterprise Services (DES) in 2011.

== Statutory authority ==
The legislative intent in creating DIS was to make government information and services more available, accessible and affordable. The Legislature also created the Information Services Board (ISB) to provide coordinated planning and management of state information technology services. DIS provides staff support to the ISB, and acts to oversee compliance with ISB policy in agency technology operations and investments. Chapter 43.105 RCW establishes the ISB structure and outlines DIS' statutory authority.

Powers and duties granted to DIS include:

- To provide technology services on a cost-recovery basis to state agencies, local governments and public benefit nonprofit entities
- To perform work delegated by the ISB, including the review of agency portfolios, the review of agency investment plans and requests, and implementation of statewide and interagency policies, standards and guidelines
- To review and make recommendations on agencies' funding requests for technology projects and to monitor the progress of those projects after they receive funding
- To review and approve standards and common specifications for new or expanded telecommunications networks proposed by agencies, public post-secondary institutions, educational service districts or statewide or regional providers of K-12 information technology services
- To collaborate with the ISB and agencies in the preparation of a statewide strategic technology plan and its related Washington State Digital Government Plan
- To prepare, with direction from the ISB, a biennial state performance report on information technology
