= Boilerplate =

Boilerplate may refer to:

- Boilerplate text, any text that is or can be reused in new contexts or applications without being changed much from the original
  - Boilerplate code, code that appears in different programs mostly unaltered due to conventions or syntactical requirements to form a minimal program
  - Boilerplate contract, standard form contract between two parties that does not allow for negotiation
  - Boilerplate clause, standard clauses of contractual terms which are included in many contracts
- Boilerplate (robot), fictional combat robot of the Victorian era and early 20th century, created in 2000 by artist Paul Guinan
- Boilerplate (spaceflight), non-functional craft, system, or payload which is used to test various configurations and basic size, load, and handling characteristics
