= Trust for America's Health =

Washington, D.C.-based health policy organization

Trust for America's Health (TFAH) is a Washington, D.C.-based health policy organization. The organization's website calls the group "a non-profit, non-partisan organization dedicated to saving lives by protecting the health of every community and working to make disease prevention a national priority."

TFAH was founded in 2001. Lowell P. Weicker Jr., former U.S. Senator and Governor of Connecticut, was the organization’s founding president.

TFAH’s mission focuses on addressing the antecedents of poor health and on prevention. Its work helps advance evidence-based national and state policies and programs that support optimal health within all communities. TFAH develops reports, leads initiatives, participates in coalitions, and recommends policies all designed to ensure a public health system equipped to meet the challenges of the 21st century.

TFAH reports focus on public health topics including obesity, emergency preparedness, substance misuse and suicide prevention, public health funding, healthy aging, and the health impacts of environmental threats and extreme weather.

== Areas of advocacy ==
TFAH’s work is rooted in aggregating, analyzing, and reporting health data to help identify, track, and solve the nation’s most pressing health issues. In addition, TFAH works with partners to help pilot health promoting programs and policies that if successful can be scaled to help more people enjoy optional health and safeguard communities during emergencies.

- Public Health Funding
- Obesity/Chronic Disease
- Substance Misuse and Mental Health
- Public Health Preparedness
- Infectious Disease
- Climate Impact and Environmental Health
- Health Equity/Social Determinants of Health
- Prevention and Public Health Policy
- Child and School Health
- Age-Friendly Public Health

== Core reports ==
- State of Obesity: Better Policies for a Healthier America – annual report that tracks U.S. obesity rates by state, race, gender, and age and offers policy solutions.
- Ready or Not: Protecting the Public’s Health from Diseases, Disasters, and Bioterrorism – provides an annual assessment of states' level of readiness to protect the public's health during emergencies.
- Pain in the Nation: The Epidemics of Alcohol, Drug, and Suicide Deaths – report series tracks levels of alcohol, drug, and suicide deaths nationally and for population groups.
- Impact of Chronic Underfunding on America’s Public Health System – examines federal, state and local public health funding trends and recommends investments and policy actions.
- Pathway to a Healthier America: A Blueprint for Strengthening Public Health for the New Administration and Congress – published every four years to provide incoming presidential administration and Congress a “policy roadmap” for improving the nation’s health, economy, and national security.

== Funders ==
TFAH is funded by private philanthropy only. It does not accept government or industry funding.

- Bloomberg Health Initiative, Johns Hopkins University
- The California Endowment
- The John A. Hartford Foundation
- Dawn Hill Fund
- Millstream Fund
- Robert Wood Johnson Foundation
- W.K. Kellogg Foundation
