= National Vital Statistics System =

The National Vital Statistics System (NVSS) is an inter-governmental system of sharing data on the vital statistics of the population of the United States. It involves coordination between the different state health departments of the US states and the National Center for Health Statistics, a division of the Centers for Disease Control and Prevention.

== Data and publications ==
The National Vital Statistics System includes the following data sets and publications:

- Vital Statistics of the United States: The data set goes back to 1890.
- National Vital Statistics Report: This is a monthly report that goes back to January 1998. The earlier version of this report, called the Monthly Vital Statistics Report, goes back to July 1964.
- Other reports

All data is accessible online on the NVSS website.

== Related programs ==
The following programs are related to the National Vital Statistics System:

- Linked Birth and Infant Death Data Set
- National Survey of Family Growth
- Matched Multiple Birth Data Set
- National Death Index
- National Maternal and Infant Health Survey
- National Mortality Followback Survey

== Reception and impact ==
=== Academic research ===
Data from the National Vital Statistics System has been cited in academic research on many topics, including births and homicides.

A 1995 paper by Weed for Population Index described the history of NVSS and how to prepare it for the next century.

=== Use as a standard source ===
Libraries and other link collections have pointed to the NVSS as an official data source for the vital statistics of the United States.
