= Washington Shoe Company =

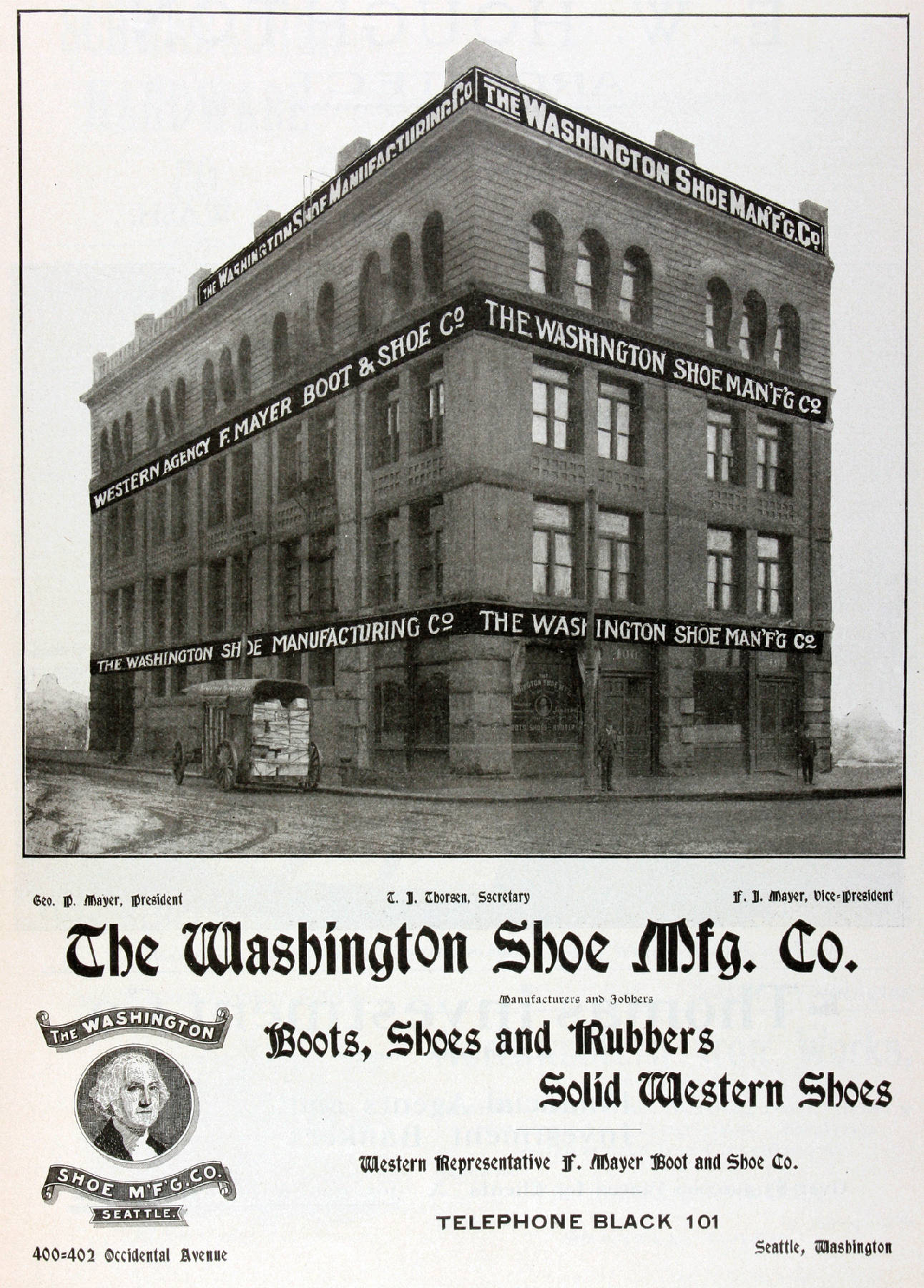
- 1904 advertisement for the company with its former Pioneer Square landmark building
- Type: Private
- Industry: Apparel
- Founded: January 24, 1891; 135 years ago in Seattle, Washington
- Founders: T.J. Thorsen (VP and GM); L.B. Allain (president); G.M. Barber (secretary)
- Brands: Western Chief; Chooka; Staheekum

Washington Shoe Company, is a manufacturer of rain boots, rain gear, work boots, snow boots, and slippers. It was founded in Seattle, Washington, in 1891. Washington Shoe Company is a fourth-generation family owned and operated business.

The manufacturer is known for its Western Chief brand of boots for men, women, and kids. The company also makes women's fashion focused waterproof boots under the Chooka brand and plush slippers for men and women under the Staheekum brand.

== History ==
Founded in Seattle on January 24, 1891 by T.J. Thorsen (Vice President and General Manager), L.B. Allain (President), and G.M. Barber (Secretary). It was Seattle's first shoe company, making boots and shoes for outdoor workers with more of a demand for the Alaska Gold Rush in 1898. Boots were made under the name, Western Chief.

In 1911, Henry Moehring joined the company, buying out his remaining partners when T.J. Thorsen died.

In 1928, it was one of five shoe manufacturers in Lynn, Massachusetts whose workers went on strike, upon their rejecting a pay cut upheld by a state board.

In 1957, brothers Norm and Robert Moehring took over the company from their father, Henry Moehring.

In 1974, Rob (son of Robert Moehring) joined the family business. In 1990, Rob acquired the company from his father and uncle, refocusing on rubber boots under the Western Chief brand. Then in 1991, Rob's son Mark Moehring joined the family business.

In 1996, the company moved from Seattle to Renton, WA. The company introduced 3D character boots for kids. Sheepskin slippers were added under the name Staheekum.

In 2001, due to new technology, women's and kids' rubber rain boots debuted a range of novelty printed boots. The company relocated to Kent, WA.

In 2002, Chooka sheepskin boots were launched, evolving into women's fashion-forward rubber boots. Rob Moehring's son, Karl Moehring joined the family business.

In 2015, Karl Moehring took over the company from his father, Rob, and is CEO. Rob Moehring is chairman.

In 2016, Washington Shoe Company celebrated its 125th anniversary.

== Copyright court case ==
A significant Ninth Circuit U.S. appeals court ruling, Washington Shoe Co. v. A-Z Sporting Goods Inc., was decided in 2012. It established the right of a company to sue in its home jurisdiction on copyright infringement claims that would not previously have been allowed.

== Washington Shoe Company Building ==
The firm's Pioneer Square, Seattle building at 159 Jackson Street is included in a historic district and has been redeveloped. Some controversy in the redevelopment was in the news in 2000. Zynga became a tenant in 2011.
