= Physical inactivity =

Lack of physical activity in a person's lifestyle

Physical inactivity refers to the lack of moderate-to-vigorous physical activity in a person's lifestyle. It is distinct from sedentary behavior.

== Health effects ==
The World Health Organization (WHO) has defined physical inactivity as a global public health problem. Each year, approximately 3.2 million people die from causes related to physical inactivity.

== Prevalence ==
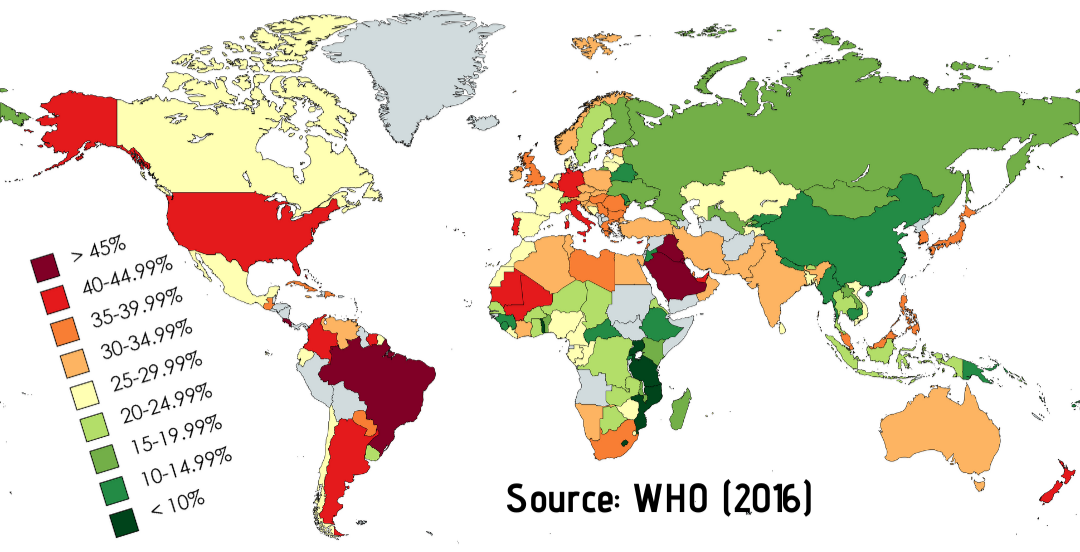
Insufficient physical activity among adults (2016)

Globally, 28% of adults and 80% of adolescents are estimated to be insufficiently active.

As of 2008, the WHO identified the Americas and the Eastern Mediterranean as regions with the greatest prevalence of physical inactivity. Nearly half of all women in both of these regions have physical inactivity, as well as 40% of men in the Americas and 36% of men in the Eastern Mediterranean. In contrast, the region with the lowest prevalence of physical inactivity is Southeast Asia. There, 19% of women and 15% of men are physically inactive.

In the US, physical inactivity prevalence varies by state and ethnicity. All states and territories had prevalence rates of more than 15% of adults. Colorado, Utah, Oregon, and Washington were the only states with physical inactivity prevalence less than 20%. Seven states and two territories had prevalence greater than 30%: Tennessee, Oklahoma, Louisiana, Alabama, Kentucky, Arkansas, and Mississippi, Guam, and Puerto Rico. Hispanics have the highest rate of physical inactivity (31.7%), followed by African-Americans (30.3%), and then non-Hispanic whites (23.4%).

== Causes ==
Several factors have been identified as part of the rising prevalence of physical inactivity. People are participating less in physical activity during leisure time. Additionally, they are increasingly likely to use sedentary behaviors during work and domestic activities. Also, instead of walking or cycling, many now use passive transportation. Urbanization may also increase physical inactivity: factors such as violence, lack of greenspace, poor air quality, and dense traffic may discourage physical activity. The rise of technology has shifted physical activity patterns, lessening the demand for manual tasks. Modern devices like computers, smartphones, and digital entertainment options have made inactive leisure more appealing.
