= Outline of Washington (state) =

U.S. state

The flag of Washington

The seal of Washington

The location of the state of Washington in the United States of America

The following outline is provided as an overview of and topical guide to the U.S. state of Washington:

Washington is a state in the Pacific Northwest region of the United States, and is named after George Washington, the first President of the United States (it is the only U.S. state named after a president). Washington was carved out of the western part of Washington Territory which had been ceded by Britain in 1846 by the Oregon Treaty as settlement of the Oregon Boundary Dispute. It was admitted to the Union as the 42nd state in 1889. The state's population at the 2010 United States census was 6,724,540. Washington is often called Washington State or the state of Washington to distinguish it from Washington, D.C.

== General reference ==
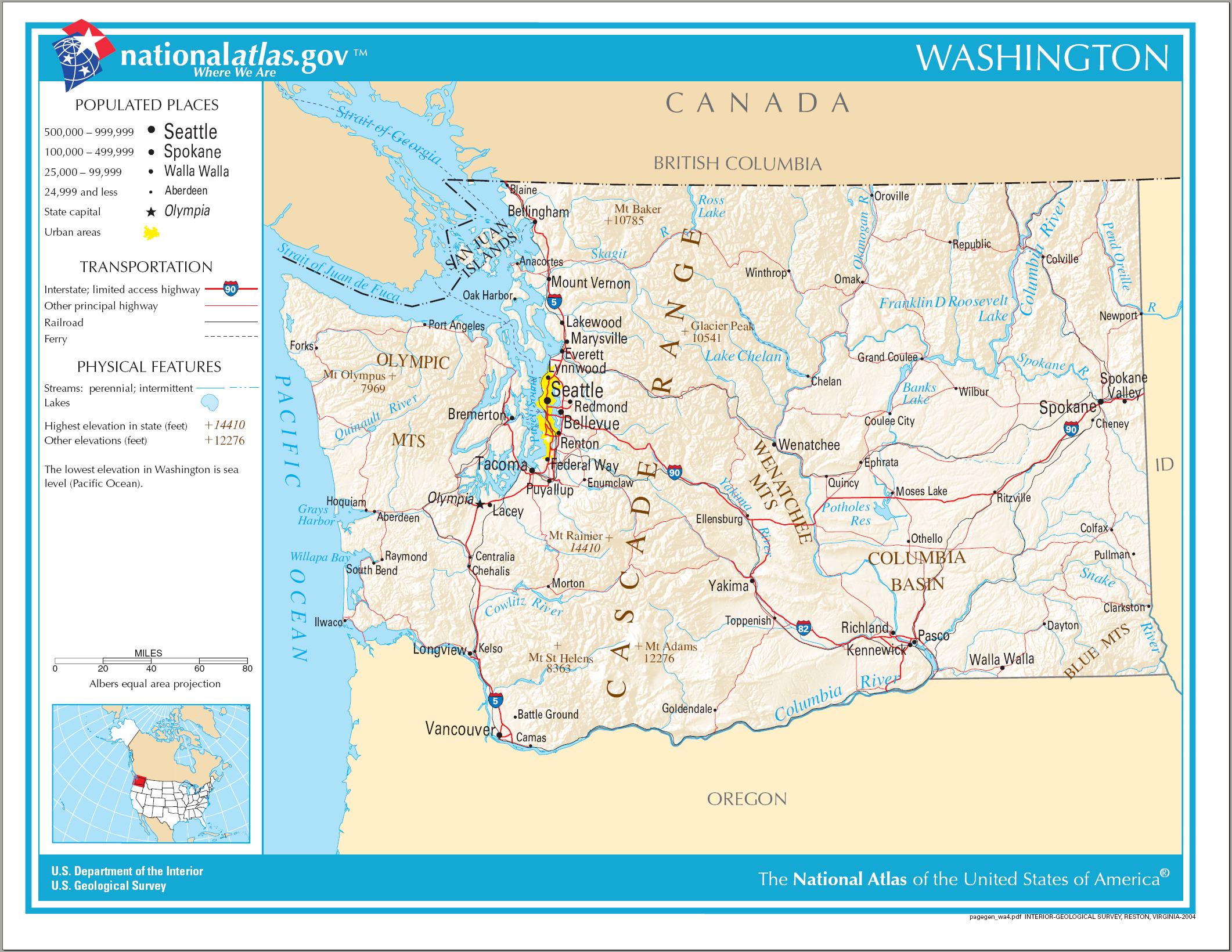
An enlargeable map of the state of Washington

- Names
  - Common name: Washington
    - Pronunciation: /ˈwɒʃɪŋtən/
  - Official name: State of Washington
  - Abbreviations and name codes
    - Postal symbol: WA
    - ISO 3166-2 code: US-WA
    - Internet second-level domain: .wa.us
  - Nicknames
    - The Evergreen State (currently used on license plates without "the")
    - Apple State
    - Chinook State
- Adjectival: Washington
- Demonym: Washingtonian

== Geography of Washington ==
- Washington is: a U.S. state, a federal state of the United States of America
- Location
  - Northern Hemisphere
  - Western Hemisphere
    - Americas
      - North America
        - Anglo America
        - Northern America
          - United States of America
            - Contiguous United States
              - Canada–US border
              - Western United States
                - West Coast of the United States
                - Northwestern United States
          - Pacific Northwest
- Population of Washington: 7,705,281 (2020 U.S. Census)
- Area of Washington: 71,362 sq mi (184,827 km^{2})
- Atlas of Washington

=== Places in Washington ===
- Historic places in Washington
  - Abandoned communities in Washington
    - Ghost towns in Washington
  - National Historic Landmarks in Washington
  - National Register of Historic Places listings in Washington
    - Bridges on the National Register of Historic Places in Washington
- National Natural Landmarks in Washington
- National parks in Washington
- State parks in Washington

=== Environment of Washington ===
- Climate of Washington
  - Climate change in Washington (state)
- Geology of Washington
- Protected areas in Washington
  - State forests of Washington
  - National Wildlife Refuges in Washington
- Superfund sites in Washington
- Wildlife of Washington
  - Fauna of Washington
    - Birds of Washington
    - Amphibians and reptiles of Mount Rainier National Park

==== Natural geographic features of Washington ====
- Lakes of Washington
- Mountains of Washington
  - Highest mountain peaks in Washington
- Rivers of Washington

=== Regions of Washington ===
- Cascade Range
- Central Washington
- Columbia Gorge
- Columbia Plateau
- Columbia River
- Eastern Washington
- Inland Empire
- Kitsap Peninsula
- Long Beach Peninsula
- Okanogan Country
- Olympic Peninsula
- Palouse
- Puget Sound
- San Juan Islands
- Skagit Valley
- Western Washington
- Yakima Valley

==== Administrative divisions of Washington ====
- The 39 Counties of the State of Washington
  - Municipalities in Washington
    - Cities in Washington
      - State capital of Washington: Olympia
      - Largest city in Washington: Seattle
      - City nicknames in Washington
    - Towns in Washington
    - Unincorporated communities in Washington
  - Census-designated places in Washington

== Government and politics of Washington ==
- Elections in Washington (state)
  - Electoral reform in Washington
  - Washington initiatives to the people
- Political party strength in Washington
- Washington initiatives to the legislature
- Washington's Lottery

=== Federal representation ===
- Washington's congressional delegations
  - List of United States senators from Washington
    - Patty Murray
    - Maria Cantwell
  - List of United States representatives from Washington
    - Washington's congressional districts

=== State government of Washington ===
- Form of government: U.S. state government
- Washington State Capitol

==== Executive branch of the government of Washington ====
- Governor of Washington
  - Lieutenant Governor of Washington
  - Secretary of State of Washington
- State departments
  - Washington State Department of Transportation

==== Legislative branch of the government of Washington ====
- Washington State Legislature (bicameral)
  - Upper house: Washington State Senate
  - Lower house: Washington House of Representatives

==== Judicial branch of the government of Washington ====
- Washington Supreme Court

=== Law and order in Washington ===
Law of Washington (state)

- Cannabis in Washington (state)
- Capital punishment in Washington (state)
  - Individuals executed in Washington
- Washington State Constitution
- Gun laws in Washington
- Law enforcement in Washington
  - Law enforcement agencies in Washington
- Same-sex marriage in Washington

=== Military in Washington ===
- Washington Military Department
  - Washington National Guard
    - Washington Air National Guard
    - Washington Army National Guard
  - Washington State Guard

=== Local government in Washington ===
- City government in the state of Washington

== History of Washington ==
History of Washington (state)

- Outline of Washington territorial evolution
- History of Latinos in Washington State

=== History of Washington, by period ===
- Prehistory of Washington
  - Kennewick Man
  - Marmes Rockshelter
- Modern exploration of Washington, 1592–1818
  - Ioánnis Fokás may have explored the Strait of Juan de Fuca, 1592
  - Juan José Pérez Hernández's northern voyage, 1774
  - Bruno de Heceta sights the mouth of the Columbia River, 1775
  - Charles William Barkley, captain of the Imperial Eagle, explores and names the Strait of Juan de Fuca, 1787
  - Robert Gray explores and names the Columbia River, 1792
  - William Robert Broughton's voyage to the Columbia River Gorge, 1792
  - Lewis and Clark Expedition, 1804–1806
  - David Thompson's voyage on the Columbia River, 1811–1812
- Oregon Country, 1818–1846
  - Anglo-American Convention of 1818
  - Fort Vancouver, 1824–1866
  - Provisional Government of Oregon, 1843–1848
  - Oregon Treaty of 1846
- Unorganized territory of the United States, 1846–1848
- Oregon Territory, (1848–1853)-1859
- Washington Territory, 1853–1889
  - Puget Sound War, 1855–1856
  - Yakima War, 1855–1858
  - Okanagan Trail, 1858–1859
  - Pig War, 1859
- State of Washington since November 11, 1889
  - Great Depression, 1929-1939
    - 1933 Yakima Valley Strike
    - Grand Coulee Dam, 1933-1942
  - World War II, 1939–1945
    - Japanese American internment, 1942–1945
    - Hanford Site, 1943
  - Mount Saint Helens eruption of 1980

== Culture of Washington ==
Culture of Washington

- Museums in Washington
- Religion in Washington
  - The Church of Jesus Christ of Latter-day Saints in Washington
  - Episcopal Diocese of Washington
- Scouting in Washington
- State symbols of Washington
  - Flag of the State of Washington (Washington (state))
  - Seal of the State of Washington

=== The Arts in Washington ===
- Music of Washington

== Economy and infrastructure of Washington ==
Economy of Washington

- Agriculture in Washington
  - Washington apples
  - Washington wine
- Communications in Washington
  - Newspapers in Washington
  - Radio stations in Washington
  - Television stations in Washington
- Energy in Washington
  - Hydro power in Washington
  - Power stations in Washington
  - Solar power in Washington (state)
  - Wind power in Washington (state)
- Health care in Washington
  - Hospitals in Washington
- Transportation in Washington
  - Airports in Washington
  - Ferries in Washington
  - Rail transport in Washington
    - Railroads in Washington
  - Roads in Washington
    - Interstate Highways in Washington
    - State Highways in Washington

== Education in Washington ==
Education in Washington (state)

- K-12 schools in Washington
  - Washington Assessment of Student Learning
    - High schools in Washington
    - Homeschooling in Washington
    - Private schools in Washington
  - Administration of K-12 schools in Washington
    - Washington State Board of Education
    - Washington State Office of Superintendent of Public Instruction
    - School districts in Washington
    - Rural school districts in Washington
    - Educational Service Districts in Washington
  - Other related to K-12 education in Washington
    - Washington State Office of Education Ombudsman
- Higher education in Washington
  - Colleges and universities in Washington
    - University of Washington
    - Washington State University
  - Administration of higher education in Washington
    - Washington State Higher Education Coordinating Board

== See also ==
- Topic overview:
  - Washington (state)
  - Index of Washington (state)-related articles
