= Electoral reform in Washington =

Electoral reform in Washington may refer to:

- Electoral reform in Washington (state)
- Electoral reform in Washington, D.C.
