= List of Washington-related topics =

List of Washington-related topics may refer to:

- Outline of Washington (state)
- Outline of Washington, D.C.
