= Outline of Washington =

Outline of Washington may refer to:

- Outline of Washington (state)
- Outline of Washington, D.C.
- Outline of George Washington
