= Ombudsmen in the United States =

Ombudsmen in the United States are independent agencies who assist when a dispute arises between individuals and industry bodies or government agencies. Government ombudsman services are free to the public, like many other ombudsman and dispute resolution services, and are a means of resolving disputes outside of the court systems.

== Federal government ==
At the federal level, there is no unified ombudsman service. The role of handling complaints against federal authorities has to some extent been unofficially incorporated into the role of the U.S. members of Congress. This informal job has become increasingly time-consuming. It is subject to criticism on the grounds that it interferes with a legislator's primary duty, namely to read and be knowledgeable about a bill before casting his or her vote.

Several ombudsman services have been created as complaint-handling units housed within, but operationally independent from, specific federal authorities.

=== Internal Revenue Service ===
In 1979 the Taxpayer Ombudsman Office was created within the Internal Revenue Service to act as an ombudsman for the taxpayer. Renamed in 1996 as the Office of the Taxpayer Advocate, this office has a unique role with the Treasury Department as having the responsibility to submit annual reports to Congress without any prior review or comment from the IRS Commissioner, the Secretary of the Treasury, any other officer or employee of the Department of the Treasury, or the Office of Management and Budget.

=== Department of Homeland Security Citizenship and Immigration Services Ombudsman ===
The Department of Homeland Security (DHS) Citizenship and Immigration Services Ombudsman (CIS Ombudsman) provides recommendations for resolving individual and employer problems with the United States Citizenship and Immigration Services (USCIS). As mandated by the Homeland Security Act of 2002 § 452, the CIS Ombudsman is not a part of USCIS, but an independent DHS office which reports directly to the DHS Deputy Secretary.

The Ombudsman assists individuals and employers in resolving problems with USCIS; identifies areas where individuals and employers have problems dealing with USCIS; and proposes changes to mitigate identified problems. The Ombudsman submits an annual report to the House and Senate Committees on the Judiciary, focusing on systemic issues that cause delay in granting immigration benefits as well as pervasive and serious problems faced by individuals and employers in their interactions with USCIS.

The First Citizenship and Immigration Services Ombudsman (2003–08) was Prakash Khatri. During his tenure, he delivered four annual reports to Congress, including over 70 recommendations for improvements to USCIS.

=== Department of Homeland Security Office of the Immigration Detention Ombudsman ===
The Department of Homeland Security (DHS) Office of the Immigration Detention Ombudsman (OIDO) assists individuals with complaints about the potential violation of immigration detention standards or misconduct by DHS (or contract) personnel; provides independent oversight of immigration detention facilities, including conducting announced and unannounced inspections, and reviewing contract terms for immigration detention facilities and services; and serves as an independent office to review and resolve problems stemming from the same.

As mandated by the 2020 Consolidated Appropriations Act, OIDO is not a part of either U.S. Immigration and Customs Enforcement or U.S. Customs and Border Protection, but an independent DHS office which reports directly to the DHS Secretary.

OIDO assists individuals in administrative immigration custody, as well as their families, attorneys, and advocates with concerns around the conditions of immigration detention. The Ombudsman issues reports about its detention oversight investigations, audits, and contract reviews, and submits an annual report to the House and Senate Committees on the Judiciary, Homeland Security, and Appropriations, identifying trends raised by individuals in detention and their representatives; detention facility compliance with detention standards, laws, and policies; and recommendations made to other DHS components on addressing systemic issues.

=== Department of Education ===
The Department of Education has an Office of the Ombudsman, which works with federal student loan borrowers to resolve loan disputes or problems from an impartial, independent viewpoint.

=== Environmental Protection Agency ===
The Environmental Protection Agency (EPA) has an ombudsman to facilitate communication between small business owners and the agency.

=== Food and Drug Administration ===
The Food and Drug Administration Ombudsman seeks to ensure that the agency fulfils its regulatory responsibilities well. In the short term, the Office is dedicated to facilitating problem resolution. In the long term, the Office looks at issues systematically in order to make the process work better. Thus it welcomes more general complaints, comments, and suggestions about FDA's regulatory processes.

=== United States Navy ===
The US Navy implemented an ombudsman program in 1970, under the direction of Admiral Elmo Zumwalt. Through the Navy Ombudsman Program, communication between the spouses of active duty personnel and the command is kept open, thereby improving the quality of life for everyone involved. The Navy command ombudsman is a voluntary position, and seeks to ensure that the dependents of active duty personnel have a channel of resources for their needs and quality of life. A command ombudsman aims to guide those who use the service to the help they may need, before, during or after a deployment. The Navy Ombudsman undergoes almost constant training, and is bound by confidentiality except in relation to allegations of child abuse. An ombudsman meets with department heads aboard a naval installation to find out the latest news, and pass it on, including news on ship deployments, cutting down on potentially harmful gossip.

=== In bankruptcy proceedings ===
In bankruptcy proceedings, when the debtor under Chapter 7, 9, or 11 is a health care business, the Bankruptcy court orders the United States Trustee to appoint one disinterested person to serve as a patient care ombudsman. The ombudsman serves to monitor the quality of patient care, protect patient interests, and inform the court of any pertinent issues relating to patient care. Similarly, if the Trustee wants to sell the personally identifiable information of a debtor's consumers, the court orders the Trustee to appoint a disinterested person to act as a consumer privacy ombudsman. This ombudsman informs the court of the risks and benefits of approving such a sale and may propose alternatives that would protect consumers' privacy.

== State-level ombudsmen ==
Since 1967 at least five state legislatures and one territorial legislature have established and continued to employ a full-time ombudsman. These states are Hawaii, Nebraska, Alaska, Iowa and Arizona, and the U.S. territory is Puerto Rico. Many other states have ombudsmen appointed by, and located within the office of the governor.

The job description for state offices of ombudsmen invariably involves the trouble-shooting function of investigating citizen complaints concerning specific acts by government agencies. For example, in Nebraska the ombudsman's duties are as follows:

To receive complaints from the public and from persons working in government; to investigate; and where appropriate to negotiate remedial action with the agencies involved. A secondary duty is to answer questions and assist people with problems relating to government.

Other state ombudsmen include:

- State of Hawaii Office of the Ombudsman: independently and impartially investigates complaints against state and county agencies and employees
- Office of Ombudsman, Iowa
- Arizona's Ombudsman Citizen's Aide
- State of Alaska Ombudsman

=== State Long Term Care Ombudsmen ===
All states have a long term care ombudsman whose duties include advocacy for residents of nursing homes and supplemental programs developed to protect long term care residents' rights.

=== State children's ombudsmen ===
Most states have a children's advocate or ombudsman service: see main children's ombudsman article.

=== Other specialist state ombudsmen ===
Other states have ombudsmen specific to particular issues, including:

- State of Minnesota Office of the Ombudsman for Mental Health and Developmental Disabilities
- New Jersey has established ombudsmen offices covering individuals with disabilities, juvenile justice, corrections, and the judiciary
- The Rhode Island Department of Environmental Management employs an ombudsman "charged with authority to undertake independent, and in certain cases confidential, fact-finding in response to external or internal complaints or questions about the Department's performance." The office is currently held by Thomas Getz.
- Washington State Office of Education Ombuds
- Michigan has an Office of Employer Ombudsman to aid in employer-related Unemployment Insurance Agency questions.
- Utah created the Office of the Property Rights Ombudsman in 1996. This office advises citizens on property rights, and helps resolve disputes arising between property owners and government agencies acquiring property. The Office is authorized to mediate between property owners and government agencies, arbitrate disputes, and issue advisory opinions on land use and development issues.
- Most states, as well as Puerto Rico, have an Ombudsman associated with its State Department of Aging (or similar). Within these states are AAAs (Area Agencies on Aging), most often headed by a paid manager of a volunteer network of ombudsmen assigned to such facilities as skilled nursing homes, personal care homes, centers for the aging (outpatient), and the like. These ombudsmen are trained and taught that they "work for the aged", not the personnel managing the facilities. They act as advocates for the residents or attendees when complaints or disputes arise between the aging and the management. If no resolution can be worked-out locally, the matter in dispute is carried higher, first to district officials and, if necessary, to the state, often involving the state licensing agency that oversees the facility in question.

In the case of Puerto Rico, while the main Ombudsman's office, created in 1977 in a statute signed by Gov. Carlos Romero Barceló is under the Legislative Branch's jurisdiction, four specialized ombudsmen offices (Aging, Veterans, Health and Disabilities) fall under the Executive Branch's Office of Ombudsmen Offices.

== City and county ombudsmen ==
=== King County, Washington ===
The King County Ombudsman's Office was created by the voters of King County, Washington, in the Home Rule Charter of 1968, and operates as an independent office within the legislative branch of King County government. King County is the most populous county in Washington and includes Seattle, the state's most populous city. The Office investigates complaints regarding the administrative conduct of King County agencies, and alleged violations of county codes dealing with employee ethics, whistleblower protection, and lobbyist disclosure. The King County Ombudsman is appointed to a renewable five-year term by the King County Council and is removable mid-term only for cause.

=== Seattle ===
The City of Seattle plans to have an Office of Employee Ombuds established in January 2019. Compared to the county ombudsman, the city ombudsman will play less of an investigative role and more of advocative role.

=== Los Angeles ===
The Los Angeles County Department of Ombudsman was created via the approval of an ordinance in 1993 by the Los Angeles County Board of Supervisors. This department was the first of its kind in the state of California and the first nationally involved in law enforcement oversight.

=== New York City ===
The New York City Public Advocate is the ombudsman for residents of New York City. It investigates and responds to telephone and written complaints/queries regarding city agency services, providing information and referrals.

=== Detroit ===
The City of Detroit Office of the Ombudsman works as an independent oversight agency to provide individuals with a confidential avenue to address complaints.

== News ombudsmen and Public Editors ==
- National Public Radio - In October 2007, journalist, author, media critic and educator Alicia C. Shepard began a three-year appointment as Ombudsman for NPR.
- Public Broadcasting Service (PBS) also has an ombudsman.

== Organizational ombudsmen ==
Organizational ombudsmen can be found in organizations across the United States. Many organizational ombudsmen can also be found in colleges and universities. The longest standing Organizational Ombudsman's office is located at Michigan State University.

== Ombudsman associations ==
- COFO - Coalition of Federal Ombudsman (COFO) - promoting and assisting ombuds in federal government institutions
- USOA - United States Ombudsman Association (USOA) - Promoting and supporting fairness, accountability, and equity in government through the public sector ombudsman
- NASOP - The National Association of State Long-Term Care Ombudsman Programs (NASOP)
- IOA - The International Ombuds Association (IOA) - a professional organization committed to supporting organizational ombuds worldwide
- ONO - The Organization of News Ombudsmen and Standards Editors
