= Climate change in Washington =

Climate change in the US state of Washington

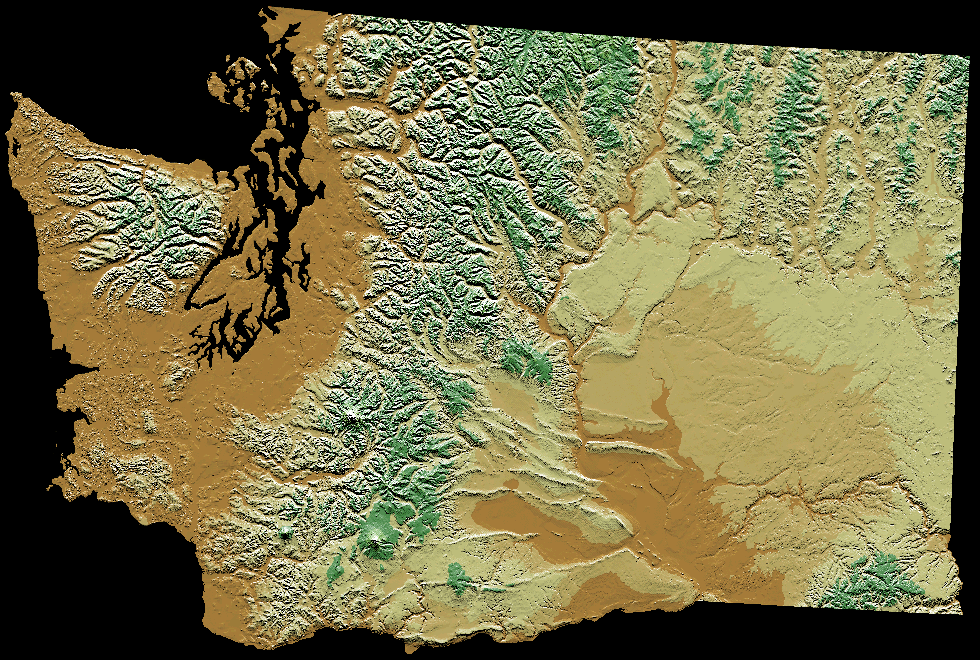
Digitally colored elevation map of Washington.

Climate change for Washington State, in the United States, has major implications on the quality of factors like health, agriculture, air quality, sea levels, and wildlife. Greenhouse gas (GHG) emissions continue to rise in concentration, destroying the ozone layer and leading to uncharacteristic rises and falls in temperature that continue the cycle of GHG production in attempts at mitigating the temperature changes. Increased temperatures cause annual snowmelt peaks and glacial melt to occur earlier in the year, resulting in reduced water availability in the summertime. Crops and brush become drier and more flammable, increasing the number of wildfires and destroying the habitats of animals dependent on ground and tree cover. Agricultural production is one of the largest outputs for Washington, and climate change harms the local economy through variable and extreme weather patterns that are not conducive to plant and soil health, or to livestock health. In addition to crops and livestock, the fishing industry depends on the habitats created by yearly snowpack levels, streams, and rivers that are threatened by increased flooding and changes to peak flow times. Climate change impacts local economies that are vital to Washington's agricultural production and revenue.

Policy in Washington centers around reducing consumer GHG emissions and funding renewable energy projects. For Seattle, this was seen in their significant efforts towards creating convenient and reliable public transportation and to increase fuel efficiency and electric vehicle use since their largest GHG source is gasoline fueled cars and trucks. With new policies and methods for addressing GHG, Washington continues its efforts towards mitigating and preventing future climate change, while dealing with the detrimental effects already in place.

== Causes and projected outcomes ==
Additional data on Washington State Climates can be found in the NOAA National Centers for Environmental Information State Climate Summary for Washington 2022 here.

For a comprehensive analysis of climate change impacts on Washington State, see the University of Washington Climate Impacts Group 2013 assessment report, available here.

=== Greenhouse gas (GHG) emissions ===
Current climate change is due to anthropogenic GHG concentrations. Human activities including burning fossil fuels, waste, and wood products cause Carbon Dioxide (CO_{2} ) emissions. CO_{2} is the least common type of GHG, while water vapor is the most common. Methane (CH4) is emitted during coal, natural gas, or oil production. Other sources include agricultural livestock and decaying organic matter. Nitrous oxide is emitted through industrial and agricultural activities. Many industrial companies have switched from burning coal and petroleum fuel to natural gas. More toxic pollutants such as hydrofluorocarbons and sulfur hexafluoride, are emitted in smaller rates and are known as High Global Warming Potential Gases.

The state government regularly publishes GHG inventories. The Environmental Protection Agency (EPA) helps forward the process by providing the state with inventory guidance and technical assistance. These inventories provide the state with useful information about emissions. From here policies will be implemented and added to the State Climate Change Action Plan.

Washington State pumps out 85 to 90 million tons of GHG per year. Washington is responsible for 0.3% of the yearly GE emissions. Since 1970, the amount of harmful gases emitted by the state has grown by 75%. This figure is in line with the GHG output trend globally. Washington produces 13.5 tons of CO_{2} per person per year. This number is 30% lower than the national average due to the state's reliance on hydropower. This number is three times larger than the average person per year for the world, which is 4 tons per year.

Traffic congestion accounts for a significant percentage of WA State's contribution to GHGs. In the 2006 summary of Washington's Greenhouse Gas Emissions Report, reported by CTED of WA, 2004 data showed that Motor gasoline, diesel and jet fuel CO_{2} emissions were responsible for nearly 98% of the transportation.

The social cost of traffic congestion in Seattle amounts to $1.4 billion annually, and this wasted gasoline accounts for 1.1 billion lbs. of CO_{2} emissions (496,230 metric tons).

Washington generated most of its energy from hydropower until 1972 when a coal plant in Centralia opened. Naturally, this caused CO_{2} emissions to increase. Emissions remained steady until the early 1990s when natural gas was introduced into the spectrum of energy generation. Washington's electric energy is responsible for approximately 1/3 of the total increase of CO_{2} emissions. In 2006, electricity was responsible for 20% of all GHG emissions, but transportation is the main cause of GHG emissions in WA State. It is accountable for 43% of all emissions. Washington is equal to the national average in petroleum related emissions at 8.4 tons and ranks as the 26th in the United States according to the WA State Dept. of Community, Trade & Economic Development report published in 2006.

=== Pollution ===
Global greenhouse gas continues to increase and many nations and states are taking actions to reduce emissions of greenhouse gases, including Washington state who has teamed up with Oregon and California in an effort to reduce emissions as part of the West Coast Governors' Global Warming Initiative. The main global greenhouse gas released in Washington include carbon dioxide (CO_{2}), methane (CH_{4}), nitrous oxide (N_{2}O), and other gases that contribute to climate change. The different emission types are placed into three categories: energy, industrial processes, and agriculture. Different greenhouse gases range in their individual impact on climate change. For instance, one pound of nitrous oxide is 296 times more potent than a pound of carbon dioxide in contributing to climate change. This means even small quantities of gases emitted into the environment, like nitrous oxide, can have significant impacts on climate change.

For Washington state in particular, energy related emissions are the dominant source of GHG emissions and have increased from 61.2 MMT CO_{2}-equivalent (CO_{2}-e) in 1990 (excluding residual fuel for transportation) to 74.6 MMT CO_{2}-e in 2004, while their share has increased from 79% of total emissions to 85% over the past fourteen years. Carbon dioxide is the dominant GHG followed by methane, nitrous oxide, perfluorocarbon and sulfur hexafluoride (SF_{6}). Non-energy industrial global greenhouse gas emissions have lowered from 14% to 9%, mainly due to reduced emissions from aluminum production. This has been the result of two key elements: process changes that reduced CO_{2} and PFC emissions per ton of aluminum generated, and the post-2000 decline in aluminum manufacturing rates.

Non-energy agricultural greenhouse emissions have remained fairly constant but their percentage contribution has lowered as total emissions have increased. Here is a broken down list of pollution contributors in Washington State: 45% transportation, 16% in state electricity generation, 12% industry, 9% residential and commercial, 2% non-CO_{2} (other gasses), 9% industry (non-energy), 7% agriculture (non-energy). As you can see, the majority of energy GHG emissions and almost half of total emissions are from the transportation sector.

=== Projected outcomes ===
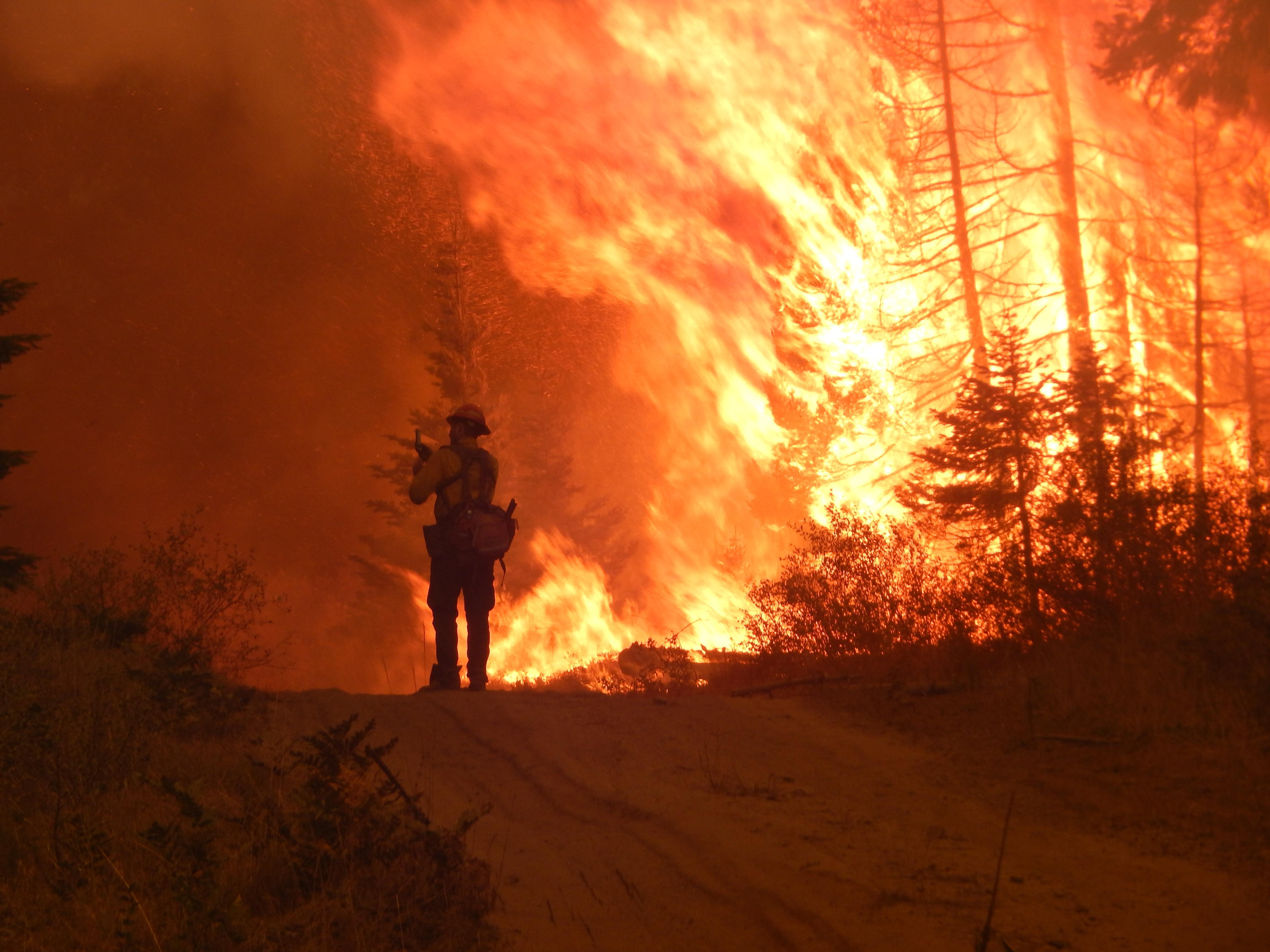
Cougar Creek wildfire, 2015

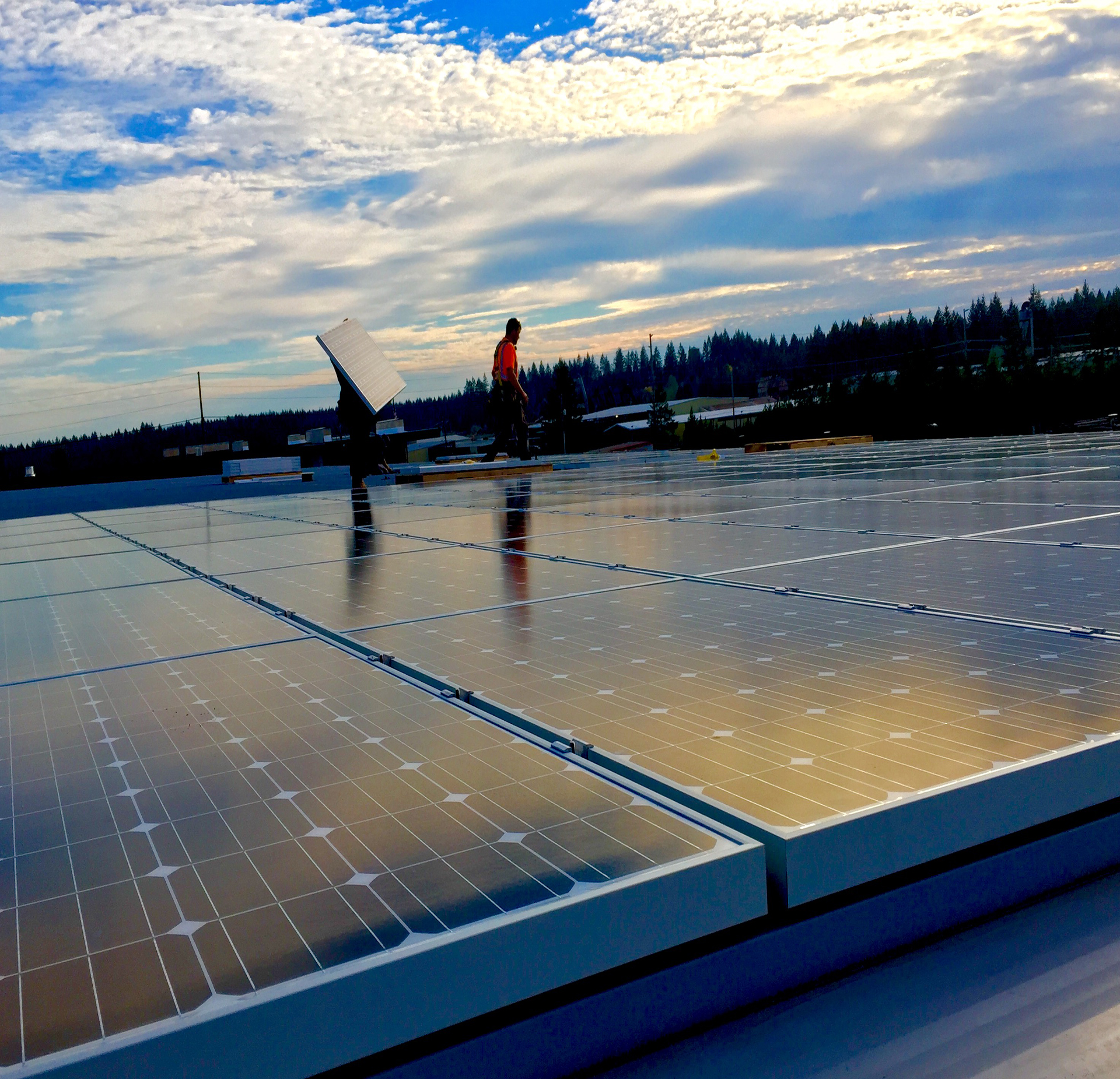
Solar installation, Shelton

Economic Impacts of Climate Change (2007) in Washington State summarizes the impact of forest fires, public health, agriculture, municipal water supply, sea level rise and fisheries on the environment. These conclusions have been reached through several predictions, based primarily on temperature and precipitation models for climate change. The expected warming of 0.5 °F (0.28 °C) every ten years is the main source for any visible impacts. Although total annual precipitation is not expected to change significantly, the increase of temperatures will result in a more minimal snowpack leading to more rain.

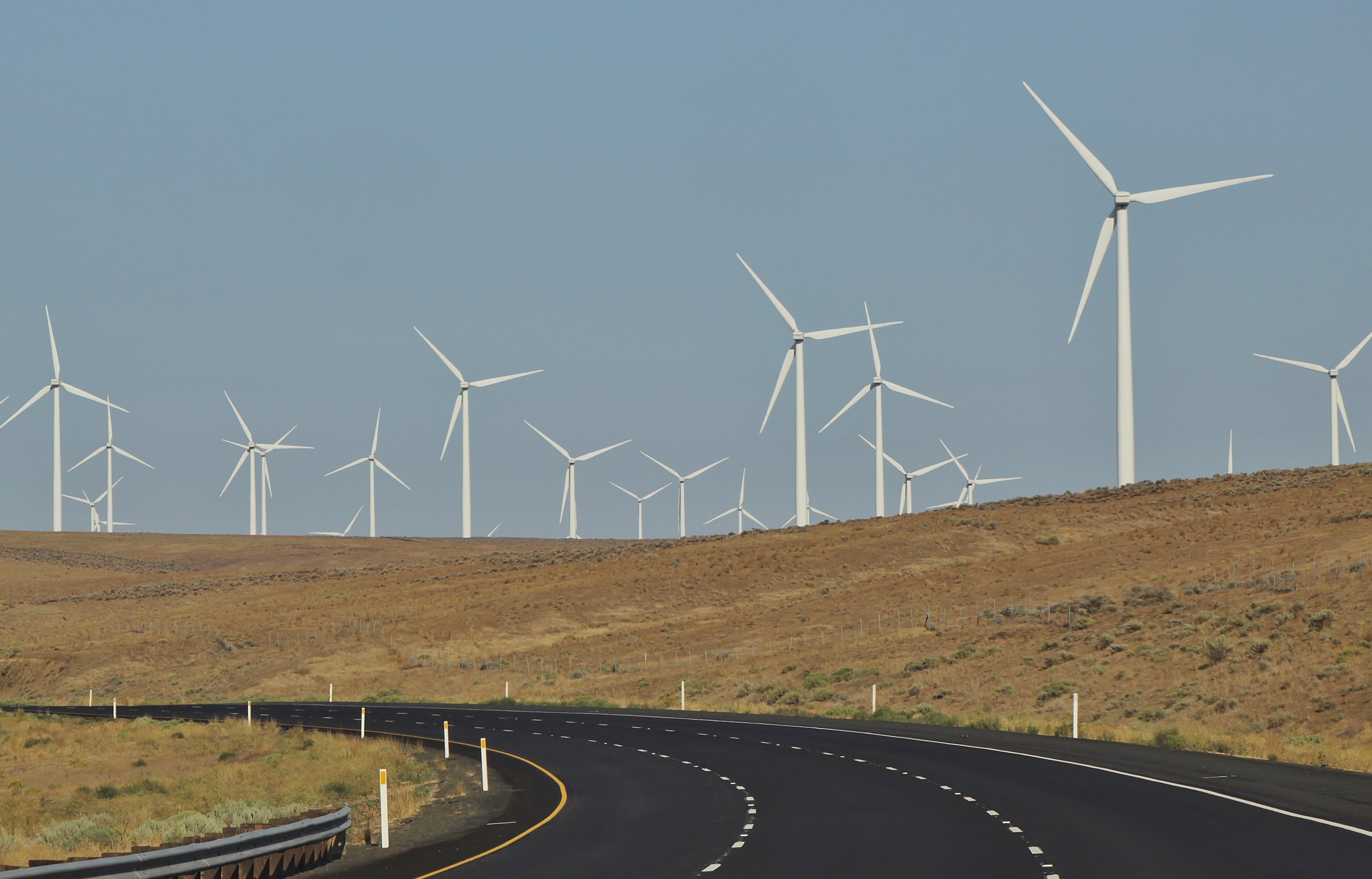
Wind installation, Ryegrass Summit

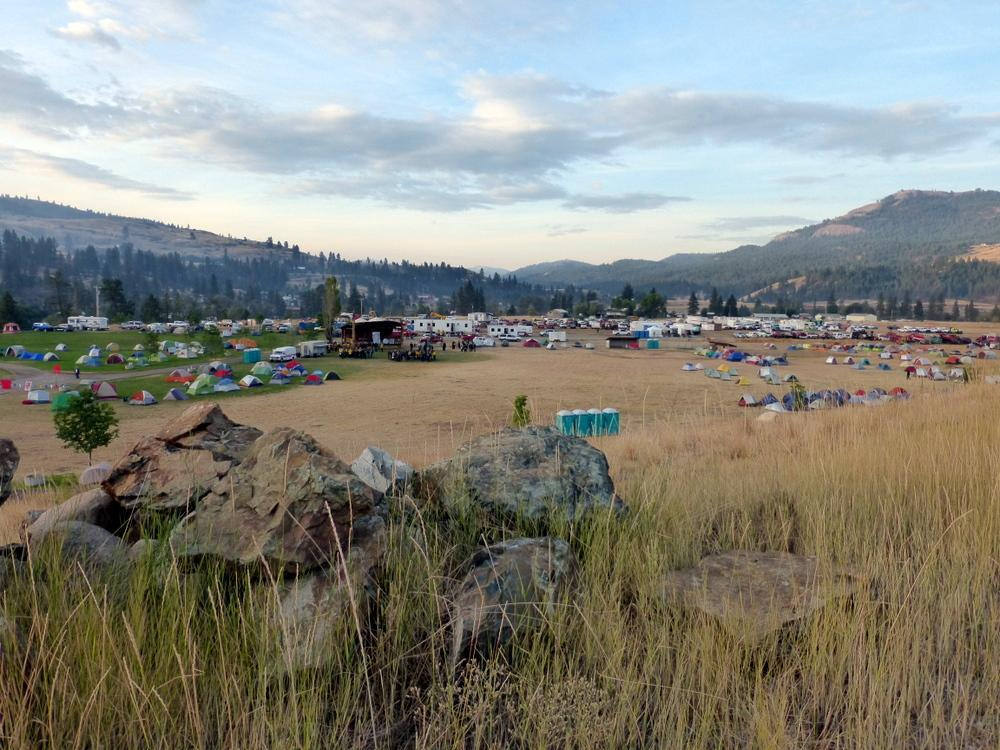
Wildfire evacuation camp, Kettle Falls

Visible physical impacts on the environment within Washington State include glacier reduction, declining snowpack, earlier spring runoff, an increase in large wildfires, and rising sea levels which affect the Puget Sound area.

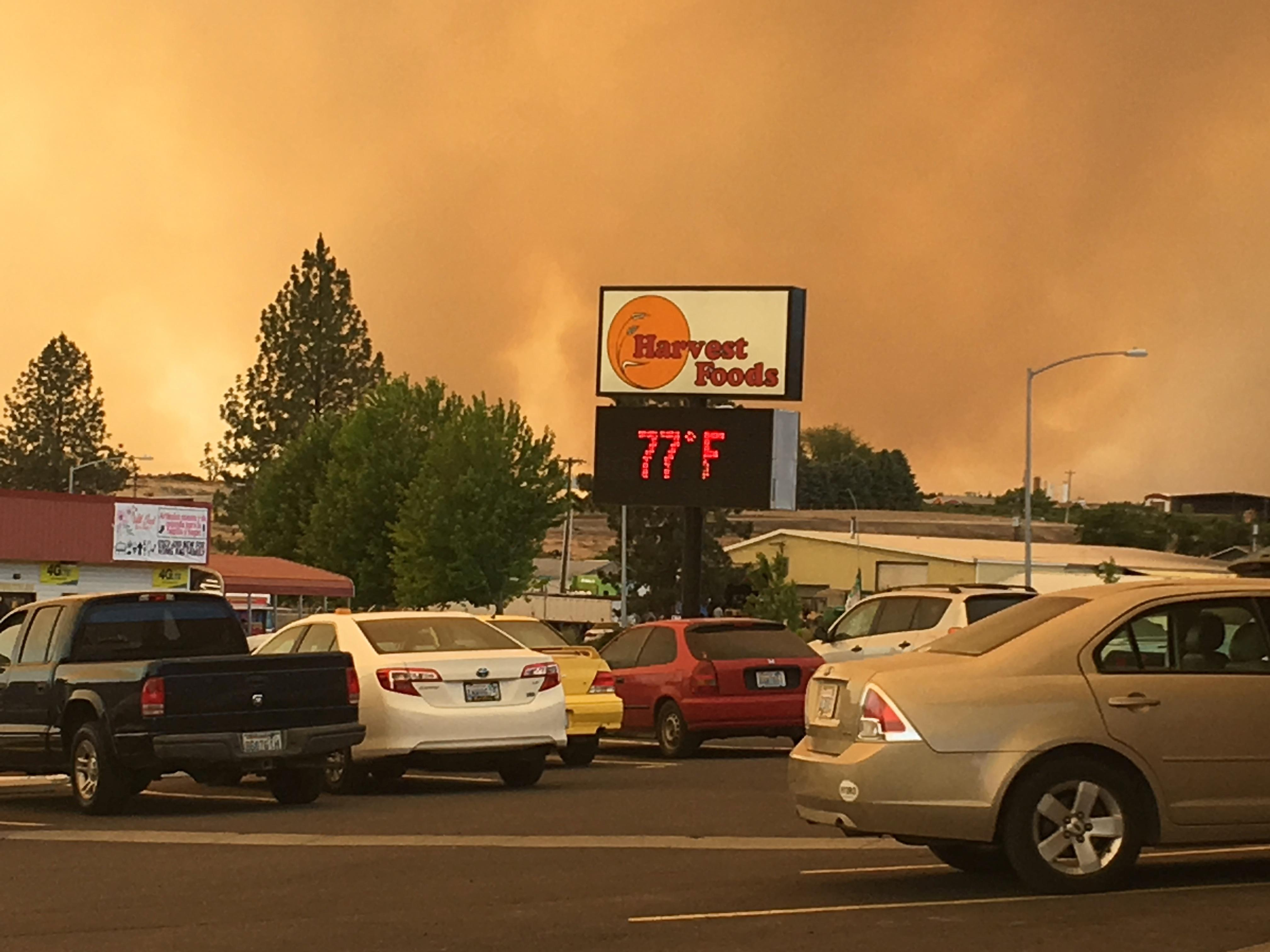
Wildfire air pollution, Royal City, 2019

According to The Economic Impacts of Climate Change in Washington State, the major impacts of climate change in Washington State (2007) include:

- Increase in carbon dioxide (CO_{2}) levels.
- Increase in temperatures: An estimated 2 °F (1.1 °C) by 2020 and up to 3 °F (1.7 °C) by 2040.
- Earlier annual snow melt.
- Sea level rise of about 3 inches to 3 feet (0.91 m) by 2100.
- No change in volume of precipitation.

Less snowpack will also result in a time change of water flow volumes into freshwater systems, resulting in greater winter river volume, and less volume during summer's driest months, generally from July through October. These changes will result in both economic and ecological repercussions, most notably found in hydrological power output, municipal water supply and migration of fish.

Collectively, these changes are negatively affecting agriculture, forest resources, dairy farming, the Washington wine industry, electricity, water supply, and other areas of the state.

In 2006, a group of scientists and economists published The Impacts of Climate Change on Washington's Economy, a preliminary assessment on the possible risks and opportunities given a rise in global temperatures occurs, and more specifically, the effects for the state of Washington. Three main conclusions were outlined:

- Climate change impacts are visible and the economic effects are becoming apparent.
- The costs of climate change will grow as temperatures and sea levels rise.
- Climate change will provide economic opportunities.

The economy of Washington State will dictate the effects of these impacts. These effects are unique to Washington due to individual natural resources, climate patterns, industries, and trade.

Climate change can directly affect the amount of resources that generate economic activity. Climate change can also affect the quality of important resources such as fresh drinking water, irrigation of crops and the generation of electricity. Climate change can also accelerate the depletion of capital assets used toward the formation of seawalls that are needed to protect shorelines from rising sea levels. Climate change can affect human health in ways that impact families and the workforce (e.g., premature death, increased sick days or leaves of absence, health care costs and insurance claims), all of which also impair quality of life.

Washington state has a varied and active economy of approximately $268.5 billion. Washington's gross state product is the sum of twenty-one economic sectors ranging from mining ($400 million in 2004) to real estate, rental, and leasing ($38.8 billion) in 2004. The extent of vulnerability in dealing with climate-related issues is hard to assess for each sector individually. National and international trade and inter-sector links stretch out the vulnerability to climate change effects.

== Impact from temperature changes ==
=== Electricity ===
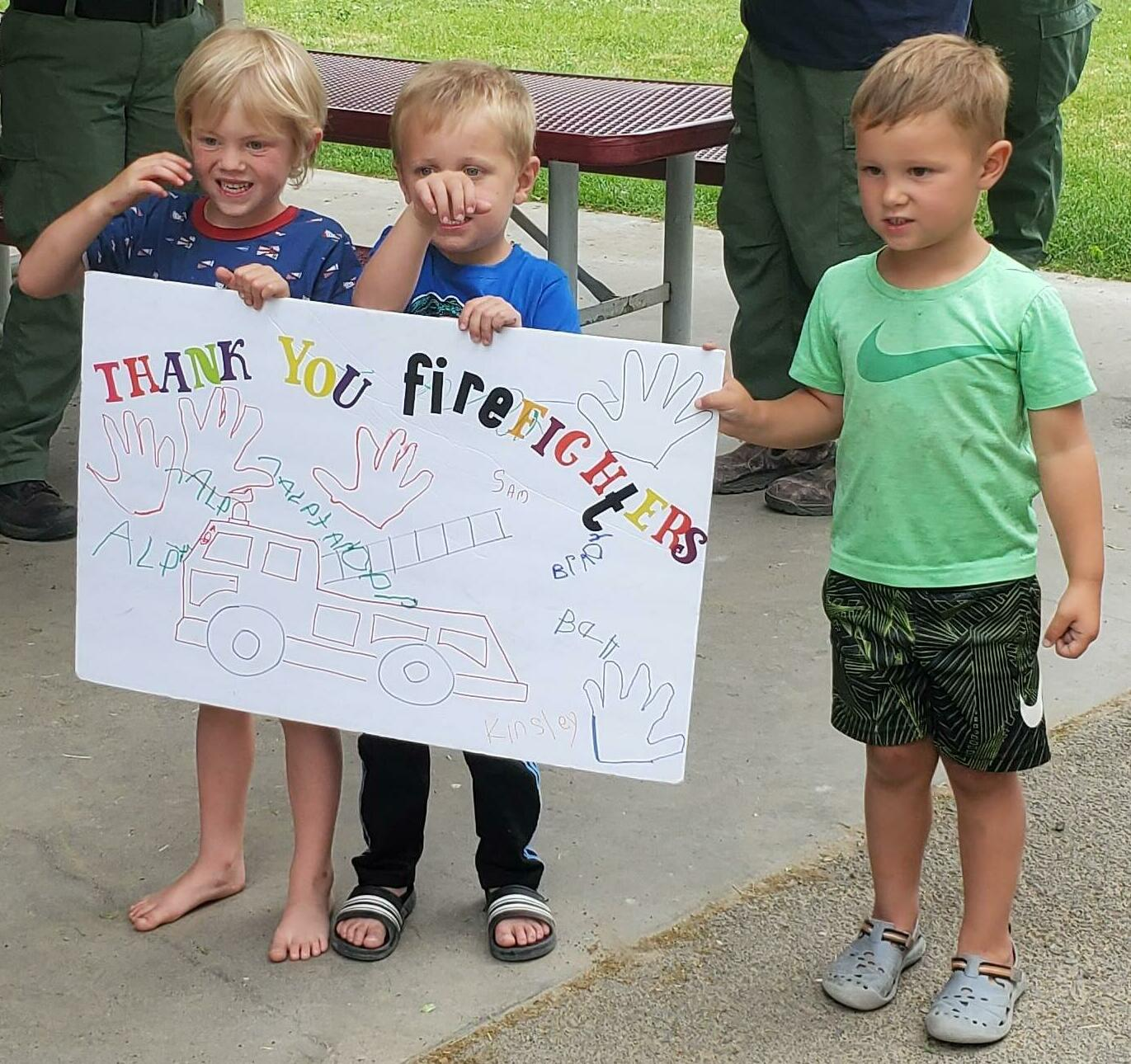
Children with sign thanking firefighters, 2019 wildfire season

Washington State relies on hydropower for 72% of its power and sales of hydropower to both households and businesses topped $4.3 billion in 2003. Washington State has the 9th lowest cost for electricity in the US. Climate change will have a negative effect on both the supply and demand of electricity in Washington.

The biggest factors determining the effects on electricity are annual temperature changes and the change in peak snowpack melt and stream flow. A change in precipitation could also have an effect on electricity supply and demand, but dramatic changes in overall precipitation are not expected. The Northwest Power and Conservation Council predicts a 300 megawatt (about 1% of Washington's generating capacity) reduction in electricity demands during the winter for each degree the temperature rises. Summer demands would probably increase due to more widespread need for air conditioning in order to keep homes and businesses cool, although estimates are still unknown. Washington State's reliance on hydropower (66% of electricity generation) means that changes in peak snowpack melt and stream flows are important to the supply of electricity. Pg. 38

The available electricity supply could also be affected by climate change. Peak stream flows are in the summer. Snowpack is likely to melt earlier in the future due to increased temperatures, thus shifting the peak stream flow to late winter and early spring, with decreased summer stream flow. This would result in an increased availability of electricity in the early spring, when demand is dampened, and a decreased availability in the summer, when the demand may be highest. The economic impact from climate change in Washington could seriously alter the finances of the state. The Northwest Power and Conservation Council predictions for the future of hydropower are grim. The state generates $777 million in gains from power sales. However, by 2020 they expect to see this fall to a deficit of $169 million and by 2040 a deficit of $730 million. These numbers understate the production shortfalls for the state because the number of air-conditioners were kept constant at current levels. A recent assessment on climate change in Washington done by researchers from Oregon State University has published estimates that a revenue impact of 5% or less ($165 million).

Hydropower is more susceptible to climate change impacts than other sources of electricity, so consumers may be subject to greater rate increases than consumers in other states.

Washington residents have low costs for electricity due to only a few electricity companies being investor-driven. In 2006, Washington residents paid 6.82 cents per kilowatt-hour (kWh), compared to the national average, which was 8.9 cents per kWh. Most of Washington's power companies charge only to break even. Thus, while prices may rise in Washington, they may still be comparable to other states in the US.

Climate change will also affect how the state purchases electricity. During the summer months, Washington sells electricity to states such as California and Arizona because prices for their states is high in these seasons. During the winter months, Washington purchases electricity from these states because of the state's need for increased heating and lighting. Therefore, increased temperatures in the summer months will alter the selling of electricity to these states and cause the state to lose money.

=== Snow and ice ===
According to the Center for Environmental Law & Policy, "Washington State is one of the nine contiguous states that has mountainous glaciers. These glaciers of the Olympic Range and the Northern Cascades produce 30 billion cubic feet (850,000,000 m^{3}) of water every year." The rate of deterioration is so fast that the Southern Cascade Glacier in Darington had lost two-thirds of its volume by 2022. "The glaciers in these ranges have, on average, decreased by 31 feet (9.4 m) and between 18 and 32% of their volume of water. An increase of 3.6 °F (2.0 °C) will cause 65% to 75% of the glaciers to disappear in 40 years." As these glaciers lose volume, their rate of deterioration will increase as well, since glaciers reflect the sunlight and heat the surrounding areas faster. Drainage basins that use glacial runoff will also be affected as glaciers contribute to a base level of water that runs off after all of the new snow cover has melted. The Middle Fork River, which provides drinking water to Bellingham, is likely to see huge decreases in its water levels in the coming years due to this issue.

Precipitation in the Cascades has begun to be altered drastically. While the level of precipitation on the Cascades has not decreased since the 1950s, it has begun to shift from snow to ice when it falls, and the amount of summer precipitation has had a substantial decline. Glacial runoff has been peaking earlier in the year causing decreased water inflow in the summer for the Puget Sound, with the 2022 levels of water into the Puget Sound decreased by 18% since 1949.

Water flows can be split up into three categories in Washington: Rain dominant, snow dominant, and transient snowmelt watersheds. The change in water falling will make snow dominant regions appear to be more like transition rivers and transition more like rain dominant. Snow dominant regions have their highest water flow several months after their highest snowfall. Due to the increase in temperature, they will change and act more like transition which has two peak flows, one in the spring due to snowmelt, and the other in the winter due to water falling as rain, not snow. The transition region now will act like rain regions which have their high points in river flows right after it rains.

=== Sea level rise ===
In Seattle, Washington, sea level is already rising by increments of 8 inches (200 mm) per century, and it is likely to rise another 19 inches (480 mm) by 2100.

The four main factors that contribute to sea level rise (SLR) are:

- thermal expansion of the ocean
- melting of land-based ice
- local atmospheric circulation
- local tectonic movement

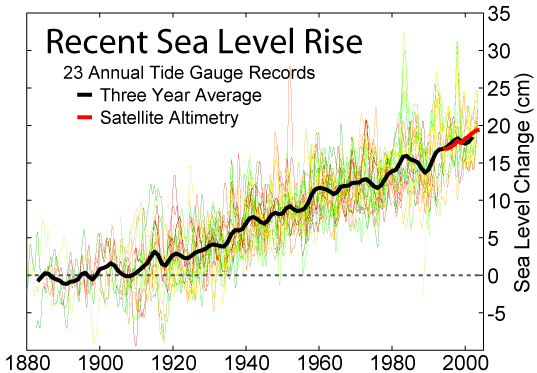
Sea level measurements from 23 long tide gauge records in geologically stable environments show a rise of around 20 centimetres (7.9 inches) during the 20th century (2 millimeters/year).

The report on Sea Level Rise in the Coastal Waters of Washington State summarized the possible sea level change for the Northwest Olympic Peninsula, Central and Southern Coast, and Puget Sound region and for each made estimates for very low, medium, and very high sea level change. For the year 2050, estimated Northwest Olympic Peninsula SLR ranged from -12 cm to 35 cm with negative SLR due to the predicted upward tectonic movement. Central and Southern Coast estimates ranged from 3 cm to 45 cm and Puget Sound was estimated at SLR of 8 cm to 55 cm. These values roughly double in all regions for the 2100 projections. Homes and businesses within reach of tidewater and low-lying agricultural areas in Washington are at high risk for flooding and current developers and anyone developing or buying property will likely take SLR into account before making an investment.

Parts of Tacoma and Olympia are at higher risks than other cities like Seattle, since many areas in Tacoma and Olympia are built just a few feet above sea level. pg. 65. Current estimates project that Tacoma and surrounding areas could see sea levels rise from 5 to 16 inches (410 mm) by 2040. It is said that "shipping terminals, marinas, docks, and recreational facilities associated with coastal port districts are places where impacts will reach more deeply into the state's economy through effects on commercial and recreational activities." The cost of preparing for such rises is largely unknown; however, Seattle has five seawalls and plans for rebuilding of the Alaskan Way seawall may increase in cost by 5-10% based on projections for sea level rise. pg. 65.

Methods to protect shorelines are to build a seawall or to pump sand onto beaches to prevent erosion. Attempts at managing river flow for the direction of increased water levels is also a possible way to control SLR. When considering the cost to protect shorelines, it is difficult to calculate due to some shorelines being developed and others undeveloped. Agricultural factors and the potential loss of profit from SLR in that vector, is also difficult to predict and often unaccounted for. Potential development for housing is often excluded also. An estimate of potential national cost to protect land from SLR and considering such variability of land quality but excluding future value, is $270–475 billion for a one-meter rise in Sea Level.

=== Changing shorelines ===
Shoreline change can be defined as the erosion of the beach, when the amount of incoming sand does not equal the amount of outgoing sand.

With over 3,000 miles (4,800 km) of shoreline, Washington State is especially vulnerable to climate related shoreline changes caused by rising sea water levels. The impact of sea level rise will depend greatly on the amount of rise which occurs, an estimate that falls between 3 inches (76 mm) and more than 40 inches (1,000 mm) within the next 100 years. An increase of two feet in sea level will cover an area of the state close to 56 square miles (150 km^{2}) and would affect 44,429 Washington residences. Agricultural areas such as Willapa Bay and the Skagit River Delta including Fir Island will be the first hit hard because their dikes and tide gates will be easily overrun by the rising tides.

The changing sea levels will have different effects along the state's coastline. Tectonic forces are causing the Cascade Peninsula to rise in step with the rising oceans. Other areas of the coastline will not be so lucky. Areas from the central to the southern region of the coast are vulnerable to the rising waters. The Puget Sound region is very vulnerable to the waters because this area is in fact gradually subsiding at a measured rate of around 24 mm a decade. As the sea level rises and this area moves down relative to the sea level it will be impacted at an earlier time than the rest of the state.

The threat of eroded beaches is not the only problem to face the coastline. Global climate change will increase both the intensity of the waves that crash onto Washington's coast line and the height of the waves. The combination of higher water levels and more catastrophic waves will cause even higher rates of damage to the coast line. These waves will destroy infrastructure that is near the coast including roads, railways, and water treatment systems and will cost the Washington State tax payer untold sums of money to both fix and prepare for.

Change in the type of land along the shoreline will also change. Tidal flats will decrease thus effecting the population of shellfish along with other coastal animals. Loss of this land could also lead to the increase of salt marshes and effect the salinity of surrounding areas. The economic effects of such land changes would be the decrease in shellfish supply, and a decrease in land value as marshes grow.

The economic importance of the coast is generally easier to measure than its aesthetic value. Waterfront property generates much of the residential tax base for coastal communities. Proximity to waterfront adds approximately 28% to the value of real estate and can be higher in some areas of Washington. In many cases development proceeds without consideration of long- and short-term shoreline change, particularly erosion. Hundreds of millions of dollars of shorefront real estate is at risk due to both chronic, long-term erosion of coastal bluffs and episodic, storm-induced erosion of dunes and barrier beaches as well as worldwide increases in sea level. Several companies have seen the potential to make money on these developments and as a result a new industry of "Climate Change Risk Reporting" has formed. Online services promise to determine your risk of flooding due to climate change by using your physical address.

=== Flooding ===
Due to the estimated 0.5° increase in temperature each decade described in the report, increased flooding will be experienced in many of Washington's coastal areas. As global temperatures rise, it causes the oceans to warm up and expand. Ice caps and glaciers also melt, and the amount of rain increases as the amount of snow decreases. All of these factors contribute to the rise in sea level, which is a principal cause of flooding. Homes and businesses within reach of tidewater and low-lying agricultural areas in Washington are at high risks for flooding. Parts of Tacoma and Olympia are at higher risks than other cities like Seattle, since many areas in Tacoma and Olympia are built just a few feet above sea level. It is said that "shipping terminals, marinas, docks, and recreational facilities associated with coastal port districts are places where impacts will reach more deeply into the state's economy through effects on commercial and recreational activities." pg. 65. The areas that are to be affected first by the increased pattern of flooding include Willapa Bay and the Skagit River Delta.

=== Outdoor recreation ===
Washington's economy is particularly susceptible to being affected by climate change in the mountains, due to the large ski industry.

Climate change will result in more rain and less snow across mountainous regions. Earlier melting of Washington's snowpack will negatively affect conditions as well, as this snowpack is responsible for ideal slope conditions, and its water supply. The breakdown of the snowpack occurs in early spring, leaving summer months dry and ending [winter sport|snowsports] much earlier than before. Over 40% of winter recreation in the past 10 years took place at lower elevation ski areas (Snoqualmie Summit, Mt. Baker, and Mt. Spokane ski areas are most likely to be affected by climate change). The Summit at Snoqualmie experienced "warm winters" in 27% of the years from 1971 to 2000, and may experience over 50% "warm winters" by 2040. Washington's ski resorts contribute greatly to the state's economy. Over the last decade there was an average of 1.65 million visits per year. Annual revenue from Washington's ski areas ranges from $50–$150 million for ski passes, tickets, and rentals. This does not include secondary revenues from skiers' food, retail sales, etc. The winter recreational season is shortening considerably due to less snow fall.

=== National parks ===
Decline of North Cascade Glaciers, 1984-2005

Climate change threatens to disrupt the natural habitat of three national parks in Washington State—Olympic, Mount Rainier, and North Cascades. It appears that the natural flow and pathways that water has taken through these parks in the past will be disrupted. Climate change has thrown glacier melting into fast forward, and it appears we could lose many streams as well as glaciers in these parks.

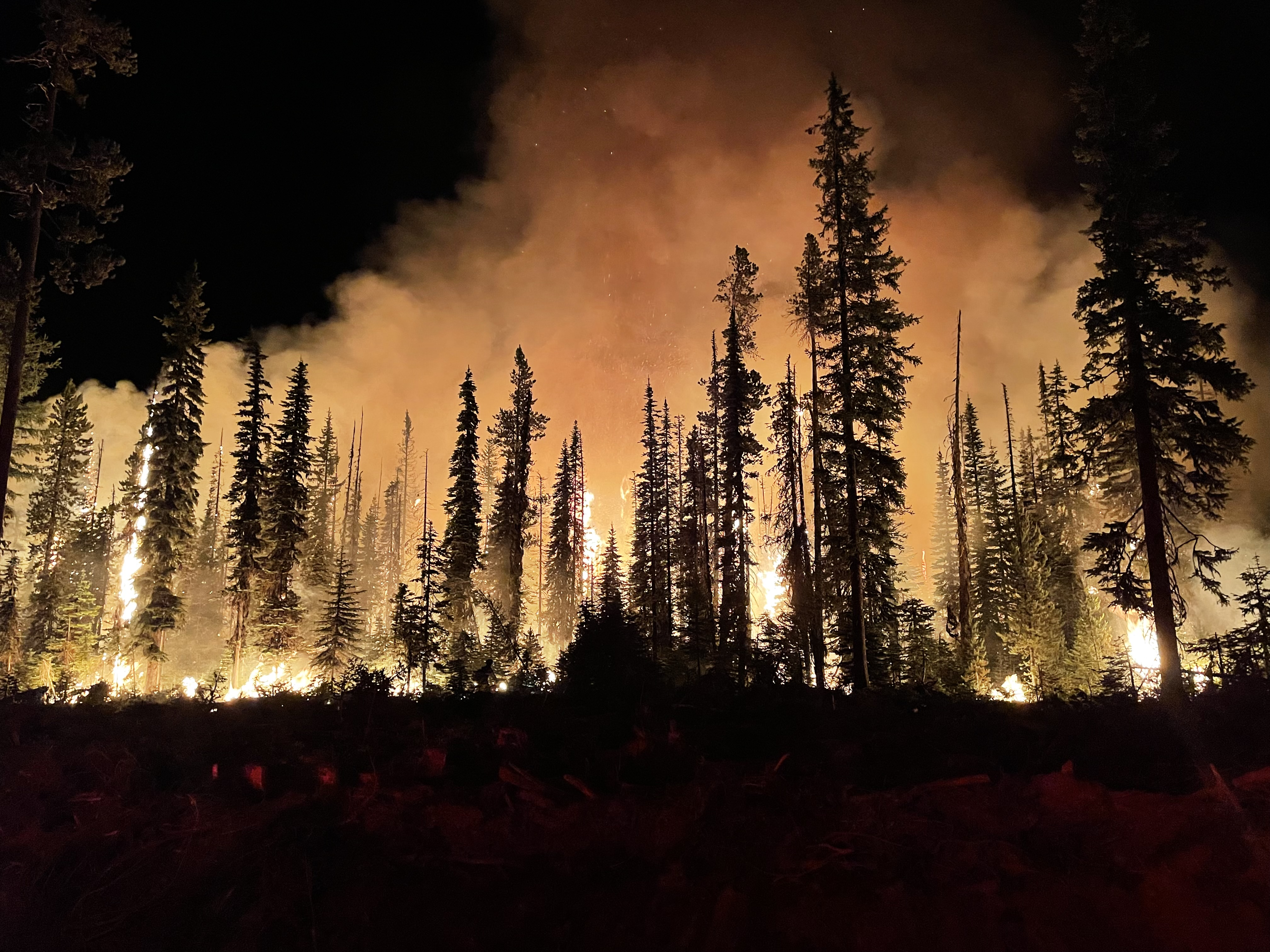
Lick Fire on the Umatilla National Forest burning at night, 2021

In the North Cascades National Park, experts estimate that some streams get about half of their late-summer flow from glaciers. Since 1959, the glaciers have lost 80% of their ice, and in Thunder Creek specifically, receding glaciers reduced summer streams on a whole by 31%. At Mount Rainier National Park the mountain's glaciers lost 21% of their area between 1913 and 1994, and in Olympic National Park, glacier retreat has been recorded for Blue Glacier as well as others.

Beyond glacial retreat, Washington may see a shift in the expansive meadows that exist in Paradise Valley. This valley owes its special characteristics (wide-open expanse, wildflowers and views) to its heavy snows and short growing season—keeping it clear of trees. Higher temperatures may mean that trees will take over these meadows, also preventing wildflowers from growing. Scientists have already detected loss of mountain meadows on both the wetter and dryer east sides of the Olympic National Park.

Forestlands comprise a significant element of Washington's economy. Out of Washington State's 43,000,000 acres (170,000 km^{2}), 22,000,000 acres (89,000 km^{2}) are classified as forestland. These forestlands support a great variety and number of economic activities, from timber production to the protection of freshwater supplies and wildlife habitat. In 2002, total employment in lumber, wood products pulp, and paper was 43,700. Timber collected on public land represents 16% of the current output from the lumber industry.

==== Forest growth ====
Beyond affecting wildfires, climate change could impact the economic contribution of Washington's forests both directly (e.g., by affecting rates of tree growth and relative importance of different tree species) and indirectly (e.g., through impacts on the magnitude of pest or fire damage). The impacts are unknown and may be either positive or negative.

One sees that climate change arises from changing temperature levels, soil moisture, atmospheric CO_{2} concentrations, and other factors—all of these things affecting tree growth. While estimates for changes in Washington forests are unavailable, other studies suggest the impacts to be significant. A study of El Dorado County, California suggests a reduction of timber yields by 18-31% by the end of the 21st century, primarily because of increased summer temperatures.

==== Pests ====
Beyond growth rates, climate change could affect Washington forests by changing the range and life cycle of pests. Very little is known about the likely impacts here, and some changes could be positive, such as the possibility of the shifting of existing pests out of Washington's forests instead of attracting new pests in. More likely to dominate, however, are the downside risks. Washington's forests have evolved to deal with existing pests, causing the loss of such pests to be of little matter. More detrimental, could be the introduction of new pests—an example of which can be seen in British Columbia where the introduction of the mountain pine beetle, which is already native to nearly the entire Pacific coast of North America, has infested and decimated lodgepole pine forests. This infestation is linked in large part to increasing temperatures.

== Ecological impacts ==
Köppen climate types in Washington.

Ecological impacts are expected to be severe, with many indicators already visible. They will be caused both directly (warmer temperatures, greater storm event intensity/frequency, etc.) and indirectly (rising sea level, more frequent wildfires, etc.) by climate change. Washington is expected to have a 0.1–0.6 °C (0.18–1.08 °F) change per decade.(WA-CC-report, P. 22). Because of this, and an expected increase in fuel buildup in some forest types, wildfire frequency and devastation will increase.(P. 24) Wildlife will be affected by climate change, with most species or populations subject to problems as a result of changes in distribution and temporal mismatching of phenological events. Statewide assessments will be used to determine what species and habitats are to be preserved. These places may not provide protection to the same species in the future due to ecosystem variation brought on by climate change (WA-CC-report, P. 22). These range shifts are individual rather than community-based, and therefore will cause dramatic community shifts in composition and/or density. This will likely result in the eventual extinction of many local populations and potentially entire species, causing an overall loss of biodiversity.

=== Plant wildlife ===
Changes in plant wildlife as a result of climate change have already been observed. As a result of greater atmospheric carbon dioxide concentration, plants have exhibited increased efficiency in water use, potentially resulting in changes in community composition and vegetation types, as well as possible but unknown effects to the global hydrological cycle. In addition, increasing temperatures have cause tree lines to advance further north and upward vertically. (P. 7)

==== Non-vascular ====
There is little research to date on climate change's effects on non-vascular plants. However, current findings suggest that most lower elevation non-vascular plant communities will increase in biodiversity due to invasion from southern species moving north. In contrast, many higher elevation non-vascular plants are considerably more sensitive to changes in the environment and are expected to suffer from reductions of growth and range, as has already been seen in the Alaskan tundra. This is made worse by invading tree populations as the tree line rises, reducing non-vascular alpine habitat.

Due to reductions of snowpack, and therefore reductions in summer water availability, significant changes in species distribution and habitats are likely to be observed as well, dictated by each individual species' ability to adapt, or more specifically, their seed dispersal rate, barriers to seed dispersal, and basic competition. (P. 19)

==== Vascular ====
Initially, Climate change will result in a lengthening of the annual growing season. However, while apparently a positive change, it is unknown to what extent plants will be affected by summer water shortages, whose effects are likely to be seen in changes of species distribution and habitats, all limited by the efficiency of adaptation of various species. (P. 19)

Like non-vascular plants, higher elevation vascular plants are expected to experience a reduction in habitat as a result of the upwardly invading tree line. Likewise, forest expansion at lower elevations into sagebrush steppe and grassland regions are also predicted as a result of increased water-use efficiency, due in part to greater atmospheric carbon dioxide concentrations. This will, in turn, result in the extinction or vast reduction of many grassland and sagebrush steppe communities.(P. 18–20)

Phenological effects will also be evident, as changes in growing season and temperatures will result in earlier leafing-out and/or flowering of many species. This may cause temporal mismatches between herbivores and availability of key food staples, and will also be seen, perhaps with more drastic effects, in parasite/host and pollinator/plant relationships. (P. 19)

=== Animal life ===
Range shifts in many species have been observed over the past century, with an average northward migration of approximately 6 km per decade. Should an expected increase in temperatures prove true, at the magnitude of two to ten times greater than the last 100 years, even more range shifts and reordering of ecological communities can be expected.

==== Invertebrates ====
The greatest impacts upon invertebrate land animals, such as butterflies or grasshoppers, will be seen in the areas of northward and vertical migration as well as a variety of phenological changes.

Changes have already been observed in the distribution of insects active year-round. As an example, during the past thirty years, the Sachem Skipper butterfly of California extended its northernmost edge 420 miles (680 km) north into WA State. We can expect to see many more examples of such changes in range or distribution in the future.

Temporal mismatching of species' biological events is likely to cause more complicated problems. One such example is the potential for the timing of butterfly hatching and the flowering of their host plants to drift apart, especially in years of drought or excessive snowpack. This may result in the complete crash or extinction of many species or populations, and may contribute to more species migrating further north.

The greatest ecological impact concerning invertebrates as a result of climate change will likely be seen in the destruction caused by insects whose populations expand in both range and lifespan, as can be seen with the mountain pine beetle throughout the northern United States and Canada. Due to a lack of low winter temperatures to reduce the beetle populations, their range and population expanded, resulting in extreme reductions and devastation of many Whitebark Pine trees, especially at higher elevations. (P. 21) As of October 2005, British Columbia, Canada, had lost more trees to beetle infestation than to wildfires or logging in an area three times the size of the US state of Maryland, resulting in 21,000,000 acres (85,000 km^{2}) of infestation, and 411 million cubic feet (11,600,000 m^{3}) of trees killed. This has had cascading effects, especially on grizzly bear populations as pine nuts are an important source of winter time food in periods of large snowpack. (P. 21)

==== Birds ====
Like other animals, the most apparent changes are expected in the areas of phenology and species and population distribution.

Poleward and upward elevation shifts have been observed already. However, in contrast to other species, the increased mobility of birds indicates that they will likely experience expansions in total livable habitat rather than reductions.

Though phenological changes may not be as detrimental to birds, between the years of 1971 and 1995, a UK study revealed that 31% of the birds studied were laying their eggs an average of 9 days earlier in 1995 than in 1971. (P. 22)

==== Mammals ====
Mammals appear to be more resilient to the effects of climate change, as little evidence can be found of its impact on their populations or individuals. It has been established that there are genuine connections between fecundity and juvenile survival and winter temperatures. Also, distribution shifts northward and upward in elevation can be expected.(P. 23)

==== Amphibians ====
Amphibians stand to be some of the worst affected by climate change, due largely to the dependence on water regimes and need for specific microhabitats, as well as their limited dispersal abilities. During the last century, rapid declines in amphibian populations were observed worldwide, and extinctions and reductions of amphibian species in the tropics have been caused both directly and indirectly by climate change. Indirect effects include the extinction of many amphibian populations and species worldwide due to changes in the distribution of pathogens and diseases. Other potential consequences include the indirect consequences of habitat modification caused by wildfires, fire changes, and changes in sea water levels and quality, as well as the direct consequences associated with rising temperatures.(P. 23–24)

Phenological challenges are considerably more prominent in amphibians than in other vertebrates. The calling and breeding phenology in spring has advanced. Six different frog species in New York State have experienced a 10- to 13-day advancement in callings associated with 1 °C to 2.3 °C rises in temperature during breeding months. Likewise, studies in England have shown an advancement of amphibian breeding by 2 to 7 weeks over a 17-year time period. Despite these surprisingly extensive effects, some amphibians appear unaffected in any negative way by these changes.(pg. 23–24)

==== Reptiles ====
The greatest impact upon reptilian species will be seen in changes in phenological events, but their limited dispersal abilities may also prove detrimental in conjunction with their specific physiological temperature constraints. Reproduction and development in many reptiles has been linked directly to climate, resulting in the possibility of very profound effects should temperatures continue to rise. For example, in some species the sex of the offspring is directly dependent upon the temperature of the egg. With the painted turtle, a 4 °C rise in temperature would result in solely female offspring. (P. 24)

==== Fish ====
Fish will likely be victim to extensive changes in distribution. Many species, such as salmon, cannot live in water over 21 °C. In addition to direct effects of temperature, increased volume and changed timing of stream flows are likely to cause many river-spawned eggs to wash downstream. Another significant factor is the timing of spring upwelling. Though unknown to what extent future climate change will affect upwelling, if at all, it is a phenomenon which is directly dependent upon climate and is essential in the survival of young fish when they reach the ocean.

The hardest hit freshwater fish habitats will be in mid to high elevations where reduced snowfall will have the biggest impact. Additionally, stream temperatures and the potential increased presence of invasive species is likely to have negative effects on most native fish.(P. 25)

==== Wetlands ====
Wetland area will reduce significantly, and most are in danger of flooding, drying up or relocating. This reduction is bad due to the role wetlands play in:

- Absorbing CO_{2}
- Efficiently absorbing surplus storm water (which will be more frequent and extensive in the future)
- Recharging aquifers and keeping streams from drying up during dry summers due to wetlands' natural water storage capacity (P. 7)
- Filtering pollutants from water, helping provide livable habitats for fish and wildlife. In Washington State, over half of all fish and wildlife depend on wetlands for their survival at some time in their lives, including bald eagles, coho salmon, and frogs. (P.1)

=== Preparing species, habitats, and ecosystems for climate change ===
In 2011, the Washington State Department of Ecology released the interim recommendations of a multi-stakeholder collaboration on preparing Washington's natural systems for the impacts of climate change, as part of the Dept. of Ecology's integrated climate change response strategy. The recommendations include goals and strategies for building the capacity of Washington's species, habitats, and ecosystems to adapt to the effects of climate change, and are available here.

== Fisheries ==
Washington, being located in the Pacific Northwest of the United States, depends heavily on the Pacific Ocean, Puget Sound, the Columbia River and many other rivers for its fishing industry. Therefore, changes in the current climate could have significant results.

On February 22, 2008, the United Nations Environment Programme (UNEP) issued a report titled "In Dead Water: Merging of climate change with pollution, over-harvest, and infestations in the world's fishing grounds", warning that three quarters of the world's key fishing grounds are at risk of being seriously impacted by rising temperatures. They reported potential consequences as changes in oceanic circulation patterns, currents that bring nutrients and remove waste from fisheries, rising surface temperatures that are expected to bleach and kill as much as 80% of the world's coral reefs – major tourist attractions and nurseries for many juvenile fish, and finally, the possible acidification of the ocean's waters as warmer water absorbs more atmospheric carbon emissions. Increased acidity would impact organisms that utilize calcium for shell-production.

Achim Steiner, UN Under-Secretary General and UNEP Executive Director, said: In Dead Water has uniquely mapped the impact of several damaging and persistent stresses on fisheries. It also lays on top of these the likely impacts of climate change from dramatic alternations in ocean circulation affecting perhaps three-quarters of key fishing grounds up to the emerging concern of ocean acidification... it is clear from this report and others that it will add significantly to pressures on fish stocks. This is as much a development and economic issue as it is an environmental one. Millions of people including many in developing countries derive their livelihoods from fishing while around 2.6 billion people get their protein from seafood."

In addition, rising temperatures are contributing to decreased snowfall and increased rain during winter months, leading to a decrease in the winter snowpack. The snowpack captures winter precipitation at higher altitudes where it acts as a bank, slowly releasing water during dryer months. The decrease in snowpack levels will lead to earlier peak flows in area streams and rivers, increased flooding, and loss of irrigation and drinking water. Also affected would be threatened salmon runs. As local water districts debate increasing water storage in dams and reservoirs, a push to consider the effects of increased water control on Washington's salmon fisheries is underway.

Climate change can also lead to loss of habitat and native species as warming temperatures allow the northern movement of invasive species. For example, the increased spread of the aquatic plant Swollen Bladderwort; a free-floating carnivorous plant, it is easily spread by waterfowl and has adapted itself to reproduce in multiple ways. Uncontrolled spread of the species, creates thick mats of vegetation which:

- Reduces the water's oxygen content
- Increases fish mortality rates
- Poses a danger to boats

While this is a single example of an invasive species given a stronger foothold by warming temperatures, this situation can lead to further invasions that risk countless native flora and fauna.

In 2007 the United States National Academy of Sciences reported that increased temperature coupled with loss of snowpack, and lower spawning flows are likely to lead to increased mortality among juvenile salmon, particularly Chinook, in the Snohomish River Basin and hydrologically similar watersheds. Increases in reservoirs and flood-control structures could mitigate peak-flow effects in lower reaches of Washington's watersheds. However, it would not have much impact on higher altitude headwaters where the effects of decreasing snowpack are more severe and the opportunities for flood-control are less likely. Increased loss of habitat and reduced escapement from increasing temperatures would have a significant economic impact on the state's overall commercial, recreational and tribal fisheries. Seattle is home to the Alaskan fish fleet. Any current change in the amount of fishing allowed will negatively affect Seattle's economy.

=== Commercial fisheries ===
The following is a partial section of the information provided by the Food and Agriculture Organization of the United Nations, Fisheries and Aquaculture Department and emphasizes the need for adaptability when looking at potential responses to the economic and ecological impacts of climate change on commercial fisheries: "The impact on fisheries of changes in the biological productivity of marine ecosystems will vary between fisheries and will depend of the specific environmental changes that occur and the particular biological characteristics of each species. Changes in a particular marine environment may become conducive to a rapid growth of a high-priced species found in that environment, while the reverse may be true in other instances. Climate change will also result in modifications of the area of distribution of marine resources. Most likely they will move towards the North or South pole, whichever is closest. Consequences for the fishing industry could be significant. An expected characteristic of global climate change is a likely increase in the variability of environmental conditions. Experience already gained in dealing with longer term fluctuations in marine environments, such as those induced by El Niño events, emphasize the need for adaptability. As well, ensuring sustainable economic levels of fishing capacity should be determined with the variability in mind. The effects of climate change on fisheries will impact a sector that is already characterized by full utilization of resources, large overcapacity and conflicts among fishers, and others, vying for alternative uses of marine ecosystems. Thus, climate change adds a further argument for developing effective and flexible fisheries management system in an ecosystem context."

According to the National Fisheries Conservation Center, in May 1994 and again in August 1995, widespread salmon fishery closures in Washington, Oregon, and Northern California resulted in the declaration of a fishery resource disaster declaration by the Secretary of Commerce. An estimated 8,000 commercial fisherman were affected by the closures. Following the declaration $25 million in economic aid, of which $13.6 million was allocated to the State of Washington, was provided via the Northwest Emergency Assistance Plan.

The funds supported habitat restoration, data collection and salmon license buyback programs. The Federal Emergency Management Agency (FEMA) provided and additional $10 million in disaster unemployment assistance, with $6.4 million of those funds being allocated to Washington. The Rural Development Administration provided $3 million in grants to finance small business development and the Small Business Administration made low-interest loans and debt-restructuring available. All costs that could potentially continue to increase as climate change further degrade existing commercial salmon fisheries.

Other potential costs may include an increase in the amount of government-sponsored buyback programs. These programs are designed to ease fishing pressure on declining stocks while providing financial assistance to those individuals who choose to exit the fishery. Buybacks take the form of Vessel Buyback Programs and License Retirement Programs. The average cost of a license or vessel purchased fewer than one of these plans is $10,000 for salmon and small vessel fleets but can rise as high as $10 million for a factory trawler such as those used further north in the Bering Sea. Nationally, these programs have totaled $160 million nationally since 1976.

=== Lake Washington ===
According to the Washington Department of Fish And Wildlife, Lake Washington is believed to hold the largest urban sport salmon fishery in the United States. Research has shown that the temperature of Lake Washington's upper layers or epilimnion, have risen more than 2.5 °F (1.4 °C) in the past 40 years. Overall the water temperature has increased a full degree Fahrenheit. The effects on local salmon runs are increasing as well. As the water warms, the lake's resident population of zooplankton such as Daphnia, important food for juvenile salmon, are declining. Increased temperatures are delaying fall turnover and maintaining stratification nearly 4 weeks longer than in previous years. Earlier stratification means earlier algal blooms, necessary food for zooplankton such as Daphnia.

Normally, the spring burst in the Daphnia population coincides with local algal blooms, providing them with the food they need to survive. However, earlier blooms now mean that other zooplankton are eating the algae before the main Daphnia bloom, severely curtailing Daphnia numbers which have dropped by more than 50% over the last 26 years. In addition, salmon in stratified lakes are more likely to seek shelter in lower cooler layers of water leaving them more vulnerable to predation. It is estimated that rising temperatures played a major part in the disappearance of roughly half the sockeye salmon returning to the Cedar River watershed through the Ballard Locks and Lake 4Washington in 2004.

=== Sport fishing ===
The U.S. Fish & Wildlife Department reported that nationwide, 27.85 million US residents purchased fishing licenses in 2006 and the federal tax revenue generated by sport fishers was $8.9 billion, roughly the equivalent to that year's budget for the U.S. Environmental Protection Agency. It has been noted that determining a definitive valuation of sport fishing is entirely subjective and based on supply and demand. Some factors that can be taken into account when determining value, other than tax revenue, are the market value of the fish that are caught, gross expenditures, i.e. travel, equipment, fishing license, expenses on site, etc., generation costs, defined as the cost of generating the demand, and market value of the fishing water, defined as the fisherman's willingness to pay for the ability to have access to the resource being valued.

A 2003 report by the U.S. Fish & Wildlife Service and a 2001 report by the American Sportfishing Association estimates that the economic impact in 2001 of restored salmon habitat on recreational fisheries in the state of Washington could potentially have yielded $1 billion in revenue and 9,400 jobs. Expanded to include Oregon and Idaho, revenue estimates for restored Northwest fisheries totaled $5.5 billion per year. The loss of these fisheries could then be assumed to potentially result in the loss of that revenue. In addition, as reported by the Save Our Wild Salmon Coalition, the numbers mentioned in these reports do not take into account the fact that recreational salmon and steelhead fishing is more costly than other sport fishing types and therefore accounts for more than their percentage of the total. In addition, these figures do not include economic totals from commercial or tribal fisheries.

=== Local economics ===
Salmon, Dungeness crab, steelhead and many other fish that are used economically will be negatively affected by the increase in temperatures. Southern species, including Hake and Mackerel are predators of baby salmon. Scientists say these species have been feeding on salmon migrating out of the Columbia River. These fish need cold and clean water to reproduce successfully. The high and low flows of the rivers will be shifted in the seasons, negatively affecting salmon rearing. Increases in water temperatures could affect the food for fish in rivers, lakes, Puget Sound and coastal ocean regions. Fishing is big business in the Pacific Northwest and many local economies depend on fishing. There is a current debate on how to allocate the run of salmon. The local Native American tribes get a modest percentage of the statewide income from salmon fishing, with the majority going to commercial fishermen. The ones left out are the sport fishermen, those who participate in recreational fishing. The economic problem with this is that sport fishermen spend much more money per fish caught, and since they are less efficient, they drive the economy through the Spending multiplier throughout the local economy.

The salmon allocation is hotly contested and when salmon populations are low, local economies suffer the majority of the impact. During 2007, the commercial fishermen caught 43% and the sport fishermen caught 57% of the total fish. Native Americans' treaties guarantee them a maximum of 50% of the total run before the commercial and sport fishers take their share, under the Boldt Decision of 1974.

== Agriculture ==
Climate change and agriculture are interrelated processes, both of which take place on a global scale. Agriculture is responsive to climate variability and weather extremes, such as droughts, floods, and severe storms. The forces that shape the climate are also critical to farm productivity. Human activity has already changed atmospheric characteristics such as temperature, rainfall, levels of carbon dioxide (CO_{2}) and ground level ozone and the scientific community expects such trends to continue. Warmer climate may give positive effects on food production; however, the increased potential for weather extremes will pose challenges for farmers. Moreover, water supply and soil moisture could make it less feasible to continue crop production in certain areas.

The Intergovernmental Panel on Climate Change (IPCC, 2007) concluded:

Recent studies indicate that increased frequency of heat stress, droughts and floods negatively affect crop yields and livestock beyond the impacts of mean climate change, creating the possibility for surprises, with impacts that are larger and occurring earlier than predicted using changes in mean variables alone. This is especially the case for subsistence sectors at low latitudes. Climate variability and change also modify the risks of fires, pest and pathogen outbreak, negatively affecting food, fiber, and forestry.

Climate Factors
Several factors directly connect climate change and agricultural productivity:

- Change in precipitation amount and patterns
- Rising atmospheric concentrations of CO_{2}
- Pollution levels such as ground level ozone
- Change in climatic variability and extreme events

Most agricultural impact studies have considered the effects of one or two aspects of climate change on a particular farming activity. Few, however, have considered the full set of anticipated shifts and their impact on agricultural production across the country.

The ways in which climate changes in Washington will affect agriculture are largely unknown. One benefit which climate change may potentially have on agriculture is the possibility of longer growing seasons. However, some of the negative effects include reduced water supply and higher demand for water. Some of the unknown effects are changes in the behavior of weeds, pests and crop diseases.

With the shifts in climate, Washington exports of agriculture goods may fluctuate. The impacts of these fluctuations are largely unknown due to the complexity and unknown extent of the changes to come.

=== Yakima Valley ===
The Yakima River Basin is the most productive and driest agricultural region in Washington state. Yakima, Kittitas, and Benton County of the River Basin produced $1.3 billion in agricultural economic output in 2004. Without adequate water available for irrigation, the basin will face serious economic impacts.

Research at the Pacific Northwest National Laboratory (PNNL) determined that the $1.3 billion output was due to water availability. Past droughts caused 10-15% losses of economic output, not including the accumulation of water loss over the years. Compared to a "good year" where the outputs are estimated at $901 million, droughts and crop losses will become more prevalent due to water shortages increasing from $13 to $79 million per year by mid-century. Water shortages will cause higher costs for farmers and amplify economic losses during drought years.

Expected global increases in temperatures will have economic effects not easy to quantify. Decreased snowpack and earlier runoff will decrease stream flow. Higher temperatures will increase evaporation in the soil and decrease its capacity to hold moisture for plants during the hottest parts of the growing season. Insects will find a haven in warmer temperatures and become a greater problem. The Columbia River Gorge is beginning show signs of adapting to warmer temperatures by producing a 3rd generation yearly. Increased numbers of hot days (over 100 °F) are expected to cause increased levels of heat-related illness, which makes the agricultural workers population especially vulnerable.

Simple tools developed to forecast the impacts of El Niño on agriculture irrigation can also be used to estimate the impacts of water shortages during climate change. Studies that focus on the water availability to the 370,000 acres (1,500 km^{2}) of orchards, vineyards, and food crops within the Yakima River Valley exploit the effects of a climate change in the region. Irrigation draws water from only five reservoirs and snowpack from the Cascades. With the arrival of early snowfall and a premature diminish, irrigation water supply is predicted to drop 20-40% in a year at mid-century due to this dramatic change. The loss to agriculture in the Yakima River Valley would be $92 million for a 2 °C increase and $163 million for a 4 °C increase.

While the amount of rainfall may not change in this region, the snowpack will due to rising temperatures. The reduction of snowpack will lower the availability of water during critical growing seasons. As water-related losses make agricultural methods less productive, reduction in the economic viability of the Yakima River Basin follows. The changes in temperature and precipitation caused by climate change means risk management options will take a more permanent form when addressing changes in crops, cultivators, and adding storage.

=== Dairy production ===
A significant rise in global temperatures will negatively affect dairy production in Washington state, which had a total of 560 dairy farms at the end of 2004. Each region will be affected differently based on the different climate and temperature fluctuations. Current predictions forecast that by 2075, milk production in the Yakima River Valley will drastically decrease during the summer months. The worst effects of climate change will be a decrease in daily milk production from 27 kg to 20 kg in the month of August. Whatcom County dairy farms are predicted to be less affected by climate change than Yakima Valley.

Summer milk production in Whatcom County is projected to fall from a little under 27 kg per cow per day to slightly more than 25 kg per cow per day. In both regions the lower milk production is directly correlated to the decrease in consumption of food stuffs. The decrease in food availability during summer is due to increasing annual temperatures that shift precipitation levels and cause a faster run-off of snowpack. With less food for the cows, milk production drastically decreases during the summer months. Higher temperatures cause a decrease in milk production.

=== Wine ===
Washington State holds second place, following California, for US wine production. A change in climate will cause vineyards to move. In 2004, wine grapes accounted for $127.5 million and were the state's 4th largest fruit group in terms of value. In 2005, the wine industry as a whole was a $3 billion industry, providing the equivalent of 14,000 full-time jobs. While it is a young industry in the state (introduced in the 1960s), it has been consecutively gaining momentum. Climate change could negatively impact Washington's wine industry.

The Yakima and Mid-Columbia valleys are the most heavily populated vineyard regions. The predicted water shortage within the next decades, due to early snow melts and unavailability in seasons following, could lead to a potential crop loss increase from $13 million to $79 million by mid-century. Because wine varieties are highly sensitive to temperatures, an increase could cause several Eastern Washington areas to move out of the ideal range for certain varietals. The climate shift could make western areas such as Puget Sound more ideal for wine production. If the magnitude of the warming is 2 °C or larger, then a region may potentially shift into another climate maturity type, which is the specific climate favorable to maturing a certain type of grape.

For instance, the chardonnay grapes of Western Washington mature well at 14–16 °C, while merlots typically produced in Eastern Washington do best at 16–19 °C. The shift of vineyard concentration to the coastal regions would mean a shift in local land value and use, production, revenue and employment. This shift would be due to an increase in average temperature. However, scientists' main concern is not the gradual increase, but that global climate change will cause more instances of extreme weather. Increased extreme weather would result in greater losses for vineyards, especially those grown east of the Cascade Range.

=== Wheat ===
Eastern Washington produces a large amount of wheat, with wheat being one of the top five Washington commodities at a $524 million production value in 2006, that is affected by climate. Some models of daily temperature do not account for the topography in Eastern Washington, resulting in distorted temperature predictions. Both topography and temperature affect the yield of wheat, but a new system called the Regional Climate Model (RCM) considers topographical data, resulting in a more accurate temperature estimate. In a 2002 study, winter wheat productions were taken at different elevations, both with and without irrigation, and the best yields were in areas with a lot of rainfall, temperate conditions, and at elevations from 1000 to 1500 meters. Both non-irrigated and irrigated harvests have increased with climate change, which has also allowed for increased production at higher elevations. The harvests also improved with the presence of higher levels of carbon dioxide.

=== Cranberries ===
Cranberry production in Washington makes up a moderate amount (less than a tenth of a percent) of agricultural revenue for the state. These berries could be affected by higher winter temperatures due to climate change. This would mean considerable losses in revenue in Washington. Washington is the fifth largest supplier of cranberries in the U.S., producing 3% of total U.S. production. There are three growing regions in Washington, including Whatcom County, Grays Harbor County, and Pacific County.

== Human health ==
=== Municipal water supply ===
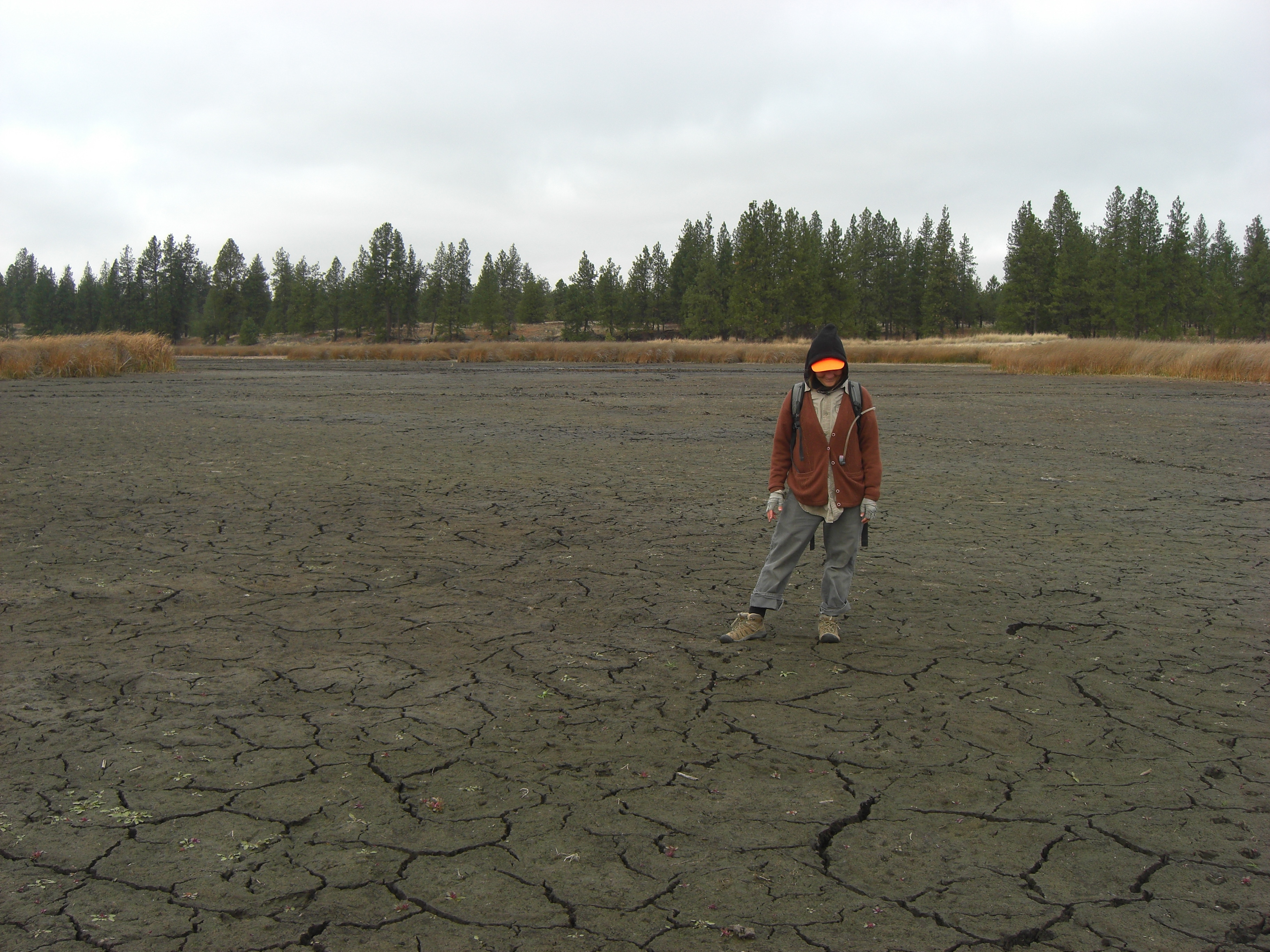
Turnbull Slough in drought, 2014

Seattle's municipal water systems may hit capacity in 2050. In the October 2005, King County Climate Change Conference, a key topic of discussion was municipal water supply. Experts predict shorter winters and longer summers, which potentially can lead to winter flooding and more severe summer droughts. A 2005 University of Washington study states that the city of Seattle could see a 14% drop in water supply by 2040. This decrease in the water supply would be equivalent to about 170,000 more people moving into the area. The Seattle Public Utilities (SPU) estimates that it will be able to maintain 171 million US gallons (650,000 m^{3}) per day production for the next 50 years and meet demand which is estimated to maintain itself at 130 million US gallons (490,000 m^{3}) as other cities such as Bellevue begin to use their own water supply. However, these numbers fail to take into account the effects of climate change. It is predicted that by 2040 the water levels will actually decrease to 147 million US gallons (560,000 m^{3}) per day.

In 2023 a drought emergency for 12 counties was declared in the state of Washington because of 75% below normal expected water supply. The impacts of climate change had probably contributed to the creation of this emergency situation.

With a predicted increase in temperature of 3° by 2040, the region's water supply as a whole is expected to decline. Water supplies come from glaciers and mountain snowpack. As temperatures rise, the elevation at which snow normally falls will increase, and there will be less water available during run-off seasons. Winter and early spring will produce more water than late spring flows, which will decrease the amount of available water during the summer. A lack of water will be problematic for both humans and the region's wildlife. This issue is also concerning because as water levels decrease, there is an expected increase in population in the Puget Sound region. The municipal water supply problem will affect different regions differently depending on the amount of public served by them and the amount of water supply that they can tap into. Everett for example, has a population of 100,000 and the Sultan river provides it with a vast amount of water compared to its population, so climate change will have a minimal effect on the supply of water to it.

The Seattle region gets the bulk of its water from the Cedar River and Tolt River watersheds. As the effects of climate change cause water levels to decrease in these watersheds, new water sources must be found. One idea proposed by a utility consortium, Cascade Water Alliance, is to use Lake Tapps, located in Pierce County as a new source of drinkable water. The project is projected to cost $450 million and take decades to complete. These reservoirs are very important to the continued stability of the municipal water supply. Reservoirs hold the early spring melt of snow so that in the summer months it can be released when the snowpack is gone. Reservoirs must be made larger to hold more of the early spring runoff. This will cost millions, if not billions, of dollars to the states' taxpayers. This, however, will only help slightly since it is projected that by the year 2040 snowpack levels that used to dip to a dangerously low level appeared every 50 years will do so every 5. No matter the size of the reservoir, if there is not enough water to fill them then they will be of little help. The other alternative to curtailing water usage would be to increase the price the consumer has to pay for the water.

=== Impacts on infectious diseases ===
West Nile fever is a serious disease linked to climate change in the US that is transmitted by mosquitoes. It favors periods of drought and heavy rain, which are likely to become more common as increased average temperatures in Washington State result in rain replacing snowfall during the winter, resulting in drier summers (chance of drought, particularly east of the Cascades). The mosquitoes will also survive longer because the warmer winters will not eliminate as many bugs as it usually does. Documentation of the West Nile virus is just beginning in Washington State, but Colorado has been grappling with cases of it since 2002. Total costs there have been estimated at $120 million or $670 million (P. 58), both as of 2006. Louisiana has been battling cases since 2001, with total costs of $190 million by 2006. In the hopes of avoiding these costs, the Washington Department of Health spends $246,000 per year on surveillance for the virus and Epidemiological follow-up and testing on suspected human cases (P. 59)

Dengue fever is an infectious disease also carried by mosquitoes and caused by any of four related dengue viruses. It is also called "break-bone" fever because it sometimes causes severe joint and muscle pain that feels like bones are breaking. Health experts have known about dengue fever for more than 200 years.

An epidemic in Hawaii in 2001 was a reminder that many locations in the United States are susceptible to dengue epidemics because they harbor the particular types of mosquitoes that carry the dengue virus.

Worldwide, 50-100 million cases of dengue infection occur each year. This includes 100-200 cases in the United States, mostly in people who have recently traveled abroad. Many more cases probably go unreported, because some health care providers do not recognize the disease.

=== Impacts on respiratory illnesses ===
Washington's asthma prevalence is among the highest in the nation, costing the state over $400 million yearly. 400,000 adults and 120,000 children suffer from it in Washington. Though increases in average yearly temperatures is the hallmark of climate change, human activities are the cause of greenhouse gases like emissions from cars, power plants, and airborne particles from human-caused forest fires. Climate change has a "direct" effect on respiratory illnesses because increased CO_{2} levels stimulate pollen production, which stimulates allergies.

More frequent flooding in WA State will increase the growth of fungus, also exacerbating allergies. Increased carbon dioxide levels have already and will continue to increase the level of pollen output in the state. In 2001 when carbon dioxide levels were 370 parts per million the pollen output for a common ragweed was twice the level of output that plants used to give out at 270 parts per million, which was the level before the Industrial Revolution. One possible scenario for the coming years is that pollen count could increase to 20 grams per cubic meter. This would cause a serious increase in the need for medication for allergies and exacerbate the effects of climate change on the economy.

=== Impacts on heat-related illnesses ===
Heat-related deaths will increase as average yearly temperatures increase. More frequent days over 100 °F (38 °C) will cause several problems for humans, including heat cramps, heat exhaustion, and heat stroke. The amount of heat waves has increased in the state of WA over the past 20 years. The average cost for each mortality from heat-related deaths is $6,250. These occur when the human body is so overwhelmed by heat that it no longer can combat the extreme level of heat. Urban settings will see even worse conditions. At night, heat levels can remain dangerously high. This is because buildings and roads absorb heat during the day and release this heat at night. Studies of heat-related mortality in eastern WA had highs of 107 °F in 2006. Hospital charges for heat-related admissions in 1998 was roughly $6250 per patient.

== Policy ==
To reduce the impacts of climate change, the state of Washington has enacted several pieces of legislation in recent years. These pieces cover areas such as construction, waste, water, air quality, and so on. There are different policies to pursue specifically in Washington State to reduce greenhouse gas emissions. Efforts to reduce GHG emissions have to take place in Washington as well as across the globe in order to minimize further warming.

As Washington State backs the need to decrease carbon emissions, the legislature is searching for ways to fund the formation of renewable energy sources. The bill SHB 1032 from 2008 taxes families and businesses to generate financial support for new renewable energy sources, and raised several concerns for taxpayers and ratepayers, and also questions as to whether it would efficiently reduce CO_{2}. This bill would begin to tax every utility customer up to $1.90 a month to fund the development of more sustainable energy projects. It would also leave industrial users paying the same as poverty-level families. Concerns arose that the taxation would impact low-income families more heavily than wealthy families. Second, because the fee is a surcharge, there was no way to reduce the fee by taking affirmative action in reduction of energy use. This left no incentive for people to reduce their use, but may have the opposite effect of encouraging more use since it was already being paid for.

Analysis of SHB 1032: Adding Subsidies for Renewable Energy Production

Executive Order 07–02, signed by Governor Gregoire on February 7, 2007, presented goals of decreasing emissions that contribute to climate change overall, as well as decreasing the use of foreign oil allowing for more employment in fields that make clean energy such as hydropower and solar power. Washington State has also encouraged public participation in the incorporation of clean energy practices into citizen's daily lives. The Climate Advisory Team (CAT) put together a collection of incentives for factories to reduce their greenhouse gas emissions. The Preparation and Adaptation Working Groups (PAWGS) proposed proactive approaches to decrease or accommodate the effects of climate change such as rising sea levels. The Citizen Engagement and Action Framework (CEAF) also furnished suggestions to decrease citizens' impacts. The CEAF also encouraged the public to take responsibility in arranging actions when some of the impacts are observed.

=== CAT's proposed reduction of greenhouse gases ===
Washington's Climate Advisory Team (CAT) published its guide to reducing Washington State's greenhouse gases on February 1, 2008. While comprehensive in nature, the report's goals can be summarized as follows:

- Build market-based mechanism to unleash investment in the creativity and innovation of Washington's economy to deliver cost effective emission reductions.
- Establish emissions reporting so that progress in emission reductions can be tracked and acknowledged.
- Analyze greenhouse gas emissions and mitigation options early in decision-making, planning processes, and development projects.
- Invest in worker training for the emerging Clean Economy to ensure having a skilled workforce and to provide meaningful employment opportunities throughout the State.
- Build and continue to redesign communities that offer real and reliable alternatives to single occupancy vehicles.
- Ensure Washington has vehicles that are as efficient as possible and use non-carbon or lower carbon intensity fuels developed sustainably from regional resources.
- Focus investments in Washington's transportation infrastructure to prioritize moving people and goods cleanly and efficiently.
- Design, build, upgrade, and operate new and existing buildings and equipment to maximize energy efficiency.
- Deliver energy from lower or non-carbon sources and more efficient use of fuels.
- Restore and retain the health and vitality of Washington's farms and forest lands to increase carbon sequestration and storage in forests and forest products, reduce the releases of greenhouse gas emissions, and support the provision of biomass fuels and energy.
- Reduce waste and Washington's emissions of GHGs through improved product choices and resource stewardship.
- Allocate sufficient state resources to maintain Washington's leadership role regionally and nationally and to fulfill its responsibilities for structuring and guiding implementation of emission reduction strategies.

=== Coastal management ===
The University of Washington's Climate Impacts Group (CIG) has worked to study the factors that affect the coastal regions. One prominent area of focus for CIG is forestry practices. To help protect coastal waters, there has been a reforestation act that states that satisfactory reforestation must take place within need a number here? years after logging. How does this citation correspond to what is cited? And what would be considered "satisfactory reforestation?" Research results suggest that as forest cover decreases to a point where less than 65% of the forest has surface cover greater than 10%, the conditions stray outside the norm. Despite the research, there is still much uncertainty as to how pollution and logging will affect the climate.

Washington's Coastal Zone:

The quality of life, cultural heritage, and continued revenues of the state all depend on a vital coastal zone as do innumerable species of flora and fauna. The Coastal Zone Management Program seeks to provide a method for making those tough choices necessary to ensure Washington's coastal zone remains a valued and treasured part of a Washington citizen's life.

In 1976, it marked the development and first ever approval by the Federal Government of Washington State's (WA) Coastal Zone Management (CZM) program. The terms and features of a state's approved CZM program are provided in what is commonly known as a state's "CZM Program Document." WA's 2003 updated program document is referred to as "Managing Washington's Coast."

One of the features of the federal CZM program important to the states is "Federal Consistency." This simply means that any public federal project carried out by a federal agency, or private project licensed or permitted by a federal agency, or carried out with a federal grant, must be determined to be consistent with the state's CZM program.

Coastal water quality has always been an important part of the federal—state coastal zone management program. In 1992 Congress provided for increased emphasis on coastal non-point pollution. WA, along with other states in the national CZM program is developing a Coastal Non-point Pollution Management plan.

WA also participates in the federal Coastal and Estuarine Land Conservation Program (CELCP); its purpose is to protect critical coastal and estuarine areas having significant conservation, recreational, ecological, historical, or aesthetic values, and threatened by conversion. Although dedicated grant funds have yet to be authorized by Congress, a state plan has been drafted to assure WA's eligibility for future participation.

There is also research on the effects on coastal boundaries in Oregon and California.

=== Seattle's Climate Action Plan and the Kyoto Protocol ===
The Kyoto Protocol requires developed countries to reduce their GHG emissions below levels specified for each country in the Treaty. Even though the United States federal government did not ratify the protocol, mayors around the United States have accepted the challenge. In February 2005, Seattle Mayor Greg Nickels challenged other mayors across the states to unite in the fight to meet or exceed the Kyoto Protocol's emissions reduction goals. In March 2006, the Mayor's green ribbon Commission delivered its report giving recommendations on how the city should go about to beat Kyoto's goal of a 7 percent reduction in green house gas emissions by 2012. The end affect should be a reduction of greenhouse gases (GHG) by about 680,000 tons per year. Seattle's Climate Action Plan consists of: reducing Seattle's dependence on cars, increasing fuel efficiency and the use of biofuels, achieving more efficient and cleaner energy for Seattle's homes and businesses, building on Seattle's leadership policy action, and to sustain Seattle's commitment policy action.

Seattle's first plan is to reduce Seattle's dependence on cars which is projected to cut emission by 170,000 tons. Their first plan of action is to significantly increase the supply of frequent, reliable and convenient public transportation. The single largest source of Seattle's GHG's come from the approximate two billion miles driven by gasoline fueled cars and trucks. The success of reducing this is to supply an alternative to driving. The city plans to invest $1.5 million to increase transit services and Transit Now plans to match the $1.5 million if the ballot passes in Seattle. Another alternative to driving is Sound Transit's Link light rail system that will operate between downtown Seattle and Seattle-Tacoma International Airport. The city will also implement a 10% commercial parking tax to set in over a three-year period beginning July 2007. Seattle also plans to rezone certain areas to provide neighborhoods easy access to transits, light rail systems, and provide amenities close enough to walk or bike. Mayor Nickels has allocated $100,000 to work with regional partners in an effort to explore and develop road pricing scenarios. Road pricing can take the form of tolling based on road congestion, the time of day, or even miles driven. These courses of action are to increase the incentives to substitute driving for a much more environmentally friendly commute.

Seattle's second plan is to increase fuel efficiency and the use of biofuels; the projected cut in emissions is expected be 200,600 tons. Seattle will start by increasing the biodiesel blend from 20 percent biodiesel to as much as 40 percent in 2007. The use of biodiesel is growing and Seattle wants to promote the use of biodiesel by making it state law to require at least 2 percent by volume of diesel sales to be biodiesel. The port of Seattle uses B99 biodiesel (99% biodiesel 1% petroleum diesel) for its own use and also cuts emissions by turning off their diesel engines when in port by using electricity from Seattle City Light. The electricity from Seattle City Light reduces GHG emissions from ferries by 30 percent. The Seattle Police department will begin replacing all of its non-pursuit vehicles to efficient gas-electric hybrids in 2007. Seattle will also provide incentives for taxicab owners to use gas-electric hybrids, and will also work in conjunction with taxi companies to decrease the amount of GHG emitted from their vehicles.

Seattle's third plan is to achieve a more efficient and cleaner energy for Seattle homes and businesses which is projected to cut GHG emissions by 316,000 tons. City Light has committed to acquire at least an average of 7.5 megawatts through conservation measures in 2007 and 2008, and they have already achieved its net-zero emissions status for 2007 by offsetting whatever emissions they produced by reducing emissions elsewhere. City Light spends about $2 per customer per year to meet its approximate carbon offset of 200,000 metric tons. City Light will continue to purchase 3 percent of its energy from Stateline Wind, a wind energy company. Seattle Steam Company, which provides heat and hot water to customers, will convert one of its fossil fuel boilers to an urban wood waste biofuel that will cut GHG emissions by 50,000 metric tons a year.

Seattle's fourth plan is to extend the city's leadership. Seattle's second largest department, Seattle Public Utilities, will evaluate its own greenhouse gas emission inventory and create a reduction target and action plan. Seattle plans on purchasing carbon-offset projects to compensate emissions from all business-related air travel by City employees. Seattle also plans to launch a campaign to encourage all City employees to reduce climate pollution not only on the job but also at home. Also, a new Department of Executive Administration green team will assess, and decide on whether to purchase climate friendly products, such as super-efficient "80-plus" computers and servers.

Seattle's fifth plan is to inspire action. The Seattle Climate Partnership will provide employers with resources for assessing their climate pollution and implementing strategies for reducing emissions. The Department of Neighborhoods will launch a Neighborhood Climate Protection Matching Fund to help promote and finance neighborhood based projects that are geared towards reducing emissions and climate pollution.

As of October 2007, the city of Seattle released that they have exceeded their goal reducing emissions to 8 percent of 1990 levels. There are 218 cities that have joined Mayor Nickels in a campaign to reduce emissions to at least 7% of 1990 levels. Even though the United States as a whole has not ratified the protocol, if all cities meet their goal, the joint reduction of emissions from the 219 cities, representing 44 million people, is equivalent to reductions from the United Kingdom, the Netherlands and the Scandinavian countries combined, says Denis Hayes, co-chairman of the mayor's Green Ribbon Commission on Climate Protection, which released the plan. Although Seattle is exceeding their goal of reducing GHG emissions, population growth fueled with their resistance to alternate methods of transportation is threatening their Kyoto goals.

For a cap and trade situation or even a tax to be truly effective they need to affect the individuals of the populations. Applying a tax to gas would greatly reduce the population's willingness to drive and make alternatives to drive more attractive. Also, there are incentives to purchase hybrid cars, use biodiesel, and other climate friendly alternatives will greatly reduce fossil fuel dependence and use.

=== Green building ===
In February 2000, Seattle became one of the first U.S. cities to enact a green building policy. Called the Sustainable Building Policy, it requires all city-funded projects covering more than 5,000 square feet (460 m^{2}) to achieve at least a LEED-silver rating. Leadership in Energy and Environmental Design (LEED), developed by the U.S. Green Building Council, is a voluntary, national green building rating system that certifies buildings for their sustainable construction and operation. Projects can receive four levels of certification - Certified, Silver, Gold and Platinum. These four levels are determined by the number of points a project receives using the LEED rating system. As of May 2006, the city has 9 LEED-certified buildings, with the most notable examples being the Seattle City Hall and Seattle Public Library, both of which are LEED-silver rated. On April 21, 2005, Washington became the first state to require that new public buildings meet the LEED standard. Similar to the Sustainable Building Policy, this law covers all state-funded facilities larger than 5,000 square feet (460 m^{2}), including school buildings.

Examples of innovative green building techniques appear here at the Green Building Features Page.

==== Economic gains from green building ====
Green building has proven not only to be good for the environment but for economic gains as well. A green building can yield increased value to the owner. A "green" designation can also increase a buildings market value as assessed by appraisers and investors. An upfront cost of 2% to support green design would on average result in life cycle savings of 20% of total construction, more than ten times the initial investment costs. An initial investment of $100,000 to build green in a $5 million project would result in savings of $1 million over the lifetime of the building. Green building enhances the community and local economy.

=== Prohibition of recyclables in garbage ===
Given that about one-quarter of Seattle's garbage consists of easily recycled materials (paper, cardboard, aluminum cans, plastic bottles and yard waste) the city council decided on a mandatory recycling ordinance for its annual economic value. The "Prohibition of Recyclables in Garbage" is estimated to save residents and businesses as much as $2 million per year by keeping future garbage cost low and aiding to the declining recycling rates since 1995 because the recyclable materials themselves hold value.

As of January 1, 2005 the city of Seattle (Ordinance # 121372) forbids the disposal of recyclables. In harmonization of commercial, residential, and self-haul, garbage penalties will now be enforced if more than 10% by volume of the container is recyclables. Enforcement with consequences began January 1, 2006. Enforcement of the ban varies dependent upon type of pick-up.

- Single-family Residents: City contractors will not pick-up garbage cans that have significant amounts of recyclables. A tag will be left instructing separation of the recyclables for the following week.
- Apartment Owners/Property Managers: City inspectors will mail two warning notices before a $50 fine is added to the apartment building's garbage bill.
- Business Owners/Property Managers: City inspectors will mail two warning notices before a $50 fine is imposed.
- Recycling and Disposal Station Customers: Self-haul customers will be asked to separate recyclables and not to dispose materials into the garbage pit.

Two years prior to the enforcement of this ordinance, in order to put the new recycling requirements into practice, Seattle Public Utilities started educational outreach programs through direct mail and an automated (206) RECYCLE phone number was established to help answer basic questions about recycling requirements. One year later, in 2005 contractors and inspectors placed notice tags on garbage cans and dumpsters that contained significant amounts of recyclables as an advanced fair warning.

=== Job growth ===
Forbes magazine ranked Washington State the fifth best state in the nation for business, and 3rd for environmental quality. The emerging "green economy" (green collar jobs) designed to achieve efforts toward low carbon and sustainability is anchored by clean energy. WA is a national leader in addressing climate change and has taken steps to reduce its climate impact, and as a result opportunities for growth in the economy have been generated. Sustainable family wage jobs are developed through a focus on cleaner energy, smarter use of natural resources, and adoption of advanced technology. State Energy Policy Office studies documented 3,800 clean energy jobs in 1998 and 8,400 jobs in 2004.

The Washington Climate Advisory Team (CAT) expects the state to meet Governor Gregoire's job creation goal of 25,000 clean energy jobs by 2020. And, Washington could potentially reach 31,000 family-wage jobs by 2025.

Clean energy sectors include:

- Energy efficiency
- Renewable energy (including solar, wind, fuel cell, geothermal, and biomass)
- Smart energy (using technological advances to improve all steps of the energy production to end-consumption process)

Clean energy industry at a glance:

- 241 organizations, 8,400 jobs
- Average salary $60,000
- More than $2.1 billion in 2004 revenues
- 64% greater concentration of clean tech jobs in WA (highest per capita jobs and revenues were in Eastern WA) than the U.S. average.

=== Mitigation ===
The Western Climate Initiative (WCI) is working to develop regional strategies to mitigate climate change in 6 states of the western U.S., including Washington, and in the westernmost provinces of Canada. Its main thrust as of 2008, is to develop a region-wide multi-sector cap-and-trade program.

In 2007, Washington Governor Christine Gregoire's executive order passed putting into effect her climate change challenge goals

Governor Gregoire aims to:

- Reduce Climate Pollution, and reduce emissions to 1990 levels by 2020.
- By 2050, reduce emissions by half of the 1990 levels.
- Grow the Clean Energy Economy and create jobs that use cleaner energy. (Clean energy jobs grew 45% between 1998 and 2004).
- Generate an increase in job growth to 25,000 by 2020.
- Move toward Energy Independence (in 2006, $9 billion were spent on imported fuel—Gregoire hopes to recover that money to cycle it back into our economy by generating our own renewable fuel industry).
- By 2020 reduce spending on imported fuel by 20 %.

In 2005, Seattle reduced its greenhouse gas emissions by 8% when compared to 1990 emissions. Despite Seattle's economic/population growth since 1990, energy use has gone down. Programs, such as the Seattle Bicycle Master Plan (SBMP) will reduce emissions even further by increasing the number of bike lanes and improving pedestrian sidewalks. Mayor Greg Nickels, "Center City Strategy," will cluster growth within Seattle by promoting urban/compact living within its downtown and local neighborhoods. Mayor Nickels, along with 700 other Mayors nationwide, signed the US Mayors Climate Protection Agreement that requires cities to meet or beat the Kyoto Treaty emission targets by 2012.

== See also ==
- Attribution of recent climate change
- Climate change denial
- Regional Greenhouse Gas Initiative
- United States federal register of greenhouse gas emissions
- Western Climate Initiative This article also discusses Idaho, Oregon, California
- Plug-in electric vehicles in Washington (state)
