= List of federal lands in Washington =

The following are protected federal lands in the U.S. state of Washington:

== National Parks ==
There are three National Park within the state of Washington:

- Olympic National Park near Port Angeles
- Mount Rainier National Park near Tacoma
- North Cascades National Park near Sedro Woolley

== National Monuments ==
The three National Monuments in the state of Washington are:

- Mount St. Helens National Volcanic Monument near Castle Rock
- Hanford Reach National Monument near Richland
- San Juan Islands National Monument near Friday Harbor

== National Recreational Areas ==
The three National Recreation Areas within the state of Washington are:

- Lake Chelan National Recreation Area near Chelan
- Lake Roosevelt National Recreation Area near Spokane
- Ross Lake National Recreation Area near Newhalem

== National Historic Sites ==
The two National Historic Sites within the state of Washington are:

- Fort Vancouver National Historic Site near Vancouver
- Whitman Mission National Historic Site near Walla Walla

== National Scenic Areas ==
The single National Scenic Area in the state of Washington is:

- Columbia River Gorge

== National Forests ==
The eight National Forests within the state of Washington are:

- Colville National Forest
- Gifford Pinchot National Forest
- Idaho Panhandle National Forest
- Kaniksu National Forest
- Mount Baker–Snoqualmie National Forest
- Okanogan–Wenatchee National Forest
- Olympic National Forest
- Umatilla National Forest

Note: the Okanogan and Wenatchee National Forests were formerly two separate National Forests that are now managed as one by the US Forest Service.

== National Wildlife Refuges ==
There are 23 National Wildlife Refuges are located in the state of Washington including:

- Dungeness National Wildlife Refuge
- Little Pend Oreille National Wildlife Refuge
- Nisqually National Wildlife Refuge
- Ridgefield National Wildlife Refuge
- Saddle Mountain National Wildlife Refuge
- San Juan Islands National Wildlife Refuge
- Turnbull National Wildlife Refuge
- Willapa National Wildlife Refuge

== See also ==
- List of Washington state parks
- List of National Register of Historic Places in Washington
