= Plug-in electric vehicles in Washington (state) =

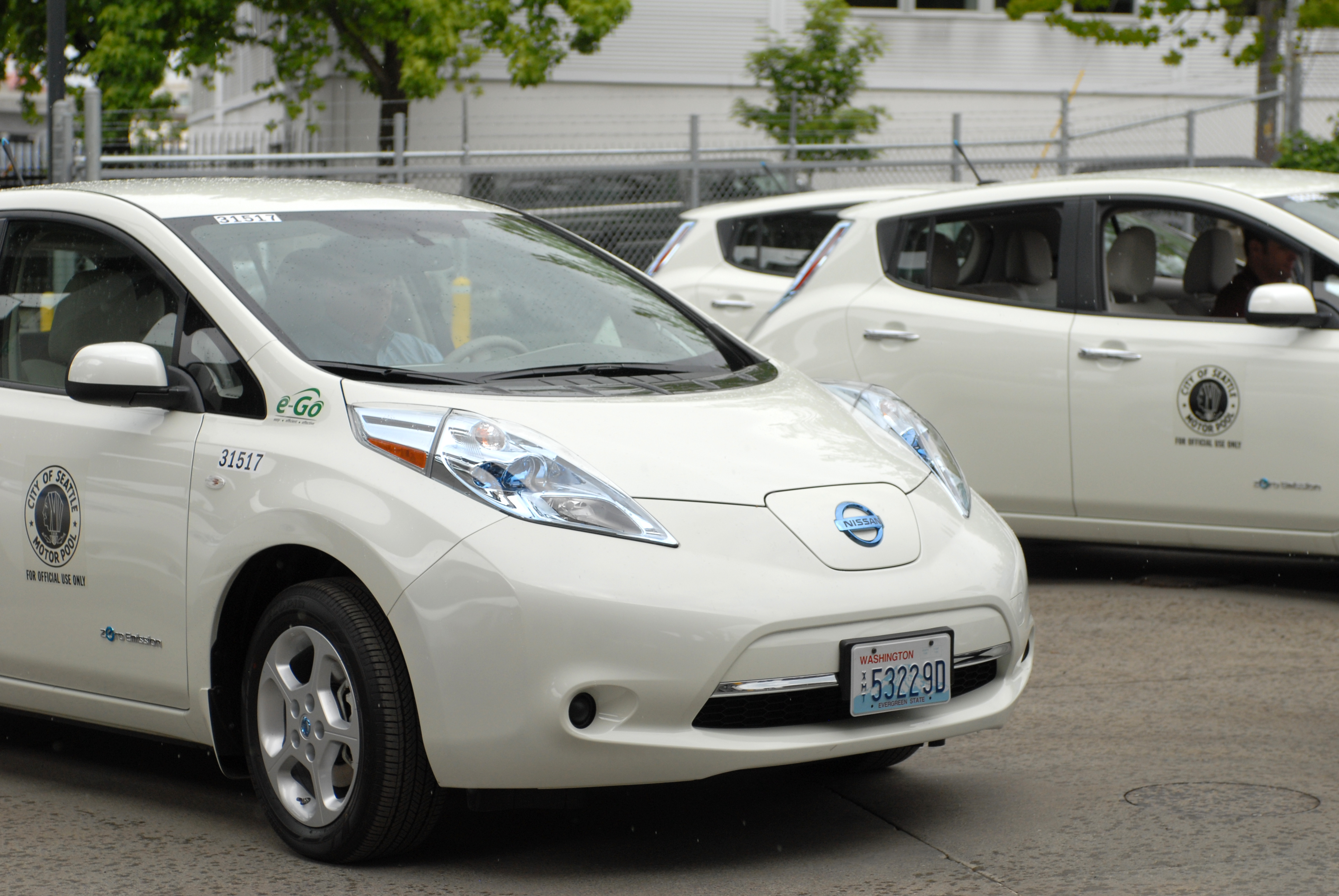
A Nissan Leaf in the Seattle city fleet

As of March 2022, there were about 92,000 electric vehicles registered in the U.S. state of Washington. As of 2021, 7.8% of new vehicle sales in Washington were electric.

In 2021, Washington was ranked by Bumper.com as the best state in the country for electric vehicle ownership.

== Government policy ==
In April 2021, the state legislature passed a bill requiring all new cars sold by 2030 to be electric; however, it was vetoed by Governor Jay Inslee. The legislature passed another bill again in March 2022, which was signed into law by Inslee, which sets an official target of 2030 for the phase-out of gasoline-powered vehicles, but does not explicitly ban their sale after that date.

In December 2021, Governor Inslee proposed a $7,500 state tax rebate for electric vehicle purchases; however, the rebate failed in the state legislature.

== By region ==
Counties in Washington by number of electric vehicles (as of March 2022)
County	EVs
Adams	35
Asotin	42
Benton	1,141
Chelan	555
Clallam	648
Clark	5,309
Columbia	8
Cowlitz	477
Douglas	180
Ferry	19
Franklin	295
Garfield	3
Grant	250
Grays Harbor	378
Island	1,100
Jefferson	597
King	47,918
Kitsap	3,297
Kittitas	295
Klickitat	140
Lewis	404
Lincoln	25
Mason	466
Okanogan	119
Pacific	131
Pend Oreille	26
Pierce	6,965
San Juan	623
Skagit	1,086
Skamania	107
Snohomish	9,878
Spokane	2,250
Stevens	105
Thurston	3,450
Wahkiakum	28
Walla Walla	256
Whatcom	2,437
Whitman	138
Yakima	505

=== Seattle ===
As of 2021, 11.7% of new vehicle sales in King County were electric.

In June 2021, Pierce County passed an ordinance requiring all new homes built from January 2022 to have dedicated parking spaces for electric vehicle charging.

=== Spokane ===
In 2021, the Spokane Police Department purchased its first electric vehicles, with a plan of transitioning the department's fleet to electric by 2030; however, the new vehicles were met with significant pushback from officers, and were subsequently withdrawn from the fleet.

In March 2022, Spokane introduced a surcharge on gasoline and diesel used by city vehicles. The city plants to convert its entire fleet to electric by 2030.
