= Electoral reform in Washington (state) =

U.S. state electoral reform

There have been several efforts at electoral reform in the U.S. state of Washington. In 2006, Pierce County's electorate adopted Amendment 3, voting to switch to instant-runoff voting, a voting system in which voters rank candidates in order of preference. Part of the impetus for this measure was dissatisfaction with the "pick-a-party primary" system. Washington requires 1,000 petition signatures for printed ballot access. Voting rights of felons are restored upon completion of sentence, including prison, parole, and probation. Bills to join the National Popular Vote Interstate Compact and award Washington's 11 electoral votes to the winner of the nationwide popular vote were introduced in both houses of the Washington State Legislature in 2007, but they died. The Bill was reintroduced in 2009, passed, and was signed into law.

In 2005, Toby Nixon, a Republican member of the Washington State House of Representatives, started a campaign to implement the Schulze method for the election of the governor of Washington. This campaign ended when Nixon left office after a failed 2006 campaign for the Washington State Senate.

== See also ==
- Electoral reform in the United States
