= Washington State Office of Education Ombuds =

State agency of Washington

The Office of the Education Ombuds, formerly the Office of the Education Ombudsman is a state agency in the Governor’s Office of the U.S. state of Washington. It is separate from the public education system. The office, a traditional government ombudsman position, handles complaints, disputes, and problems between families and K-12 schools "in all areas that affect student learning." The office also makes recommendations to the Governor and legislators for the improvement of public education.

The office addresses bullying.

== See also ==
- Education in Washington (state)
