= Bayview, Island County, Washington =

Unincorporated community in Washington, United States

Bayview, Washington
- Unincorporated community
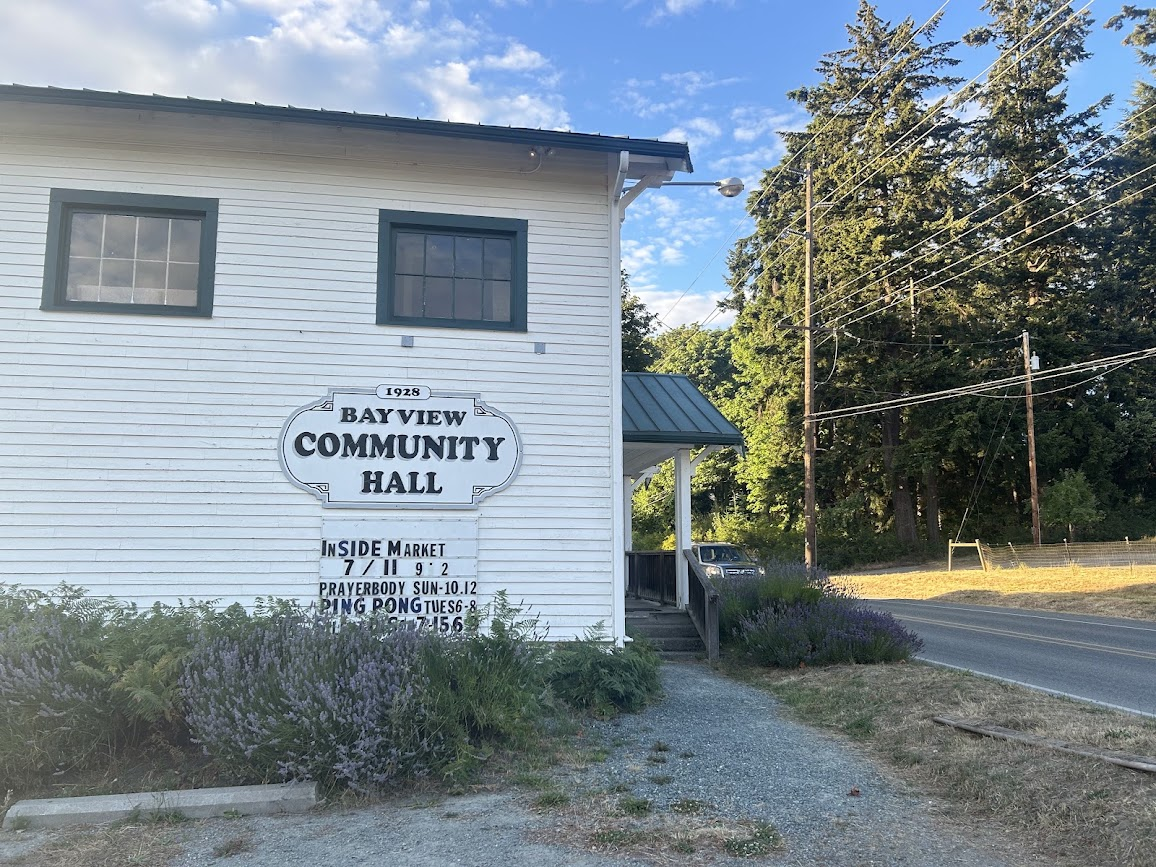
- Bayview Community Hall, built 1928

- Location within Washington (state) Location within the United States
- Coordinates: 48°00′27″N 122°27′41″W
- Country: United States
- State: Washington
- County: Island
- Elevation: 52 ft (16 m)
- Time zone: UTC-8 (Pacific (PST))
  - Summer (DST): UTC-7 (PDT)
- ZIP: 98236 Clinton; 98249 Freeland; 98260 Langley
- Area code: 360
- Telephone exchanges: 321
- FIPS code: 53-04790
- GNIS feature ID: 1530802

Bayview (formerly Whidbey City) is an unincorporated community centered at the intersection of State Route 525 and Bayview Road on Whidbey Island in Island County, Washington, United States. However, the community does not have its own legal identity, and is with the ZIP Codes for both Clinton and Langley, with the division of the two postal zones cutting through Bayview Center.

It is approximately 5 miles (8 km) west of the town of Clinton, and 4 miles (6 km) south of the city of Langley.

Bayview has two commercial centers, both near the alignments of the previous routing of the state highway, from before the current iteration was built in the 1960s. These are "Bayview Center" located in the triangle bordered by Bayview Road, Howard Road, and SR 525; and "Bayview Corner" located in the triangle bordered by Bayview Road, Marshview Avenue, and SR 525.

Bayview Center contains many of the higher traffic businesses, including a grocery store, hardware store, gas station, appliance store, and craft store. Across Howard Road from Bayview Center is one of two lumber yards on South Whidbey, along with associated garden shop.

Bayview Corner, largely focused on the Bayview Cash Store, an early 20th-century structure that was deconstructed and reclaimed and rebuilt in the early 2000s, as a commercial center by the Goosefoot Community Fund. In the adjacent area there is a restaurant, tavern, nursery, mechanic, offices, Good Cheer Food Bank, and Whidbey Telecom.

Bayview Community Hall is located just south of Bayview Corner. Built in 1927 on donated land with volunteer help, the hall is run as a nonprofit organization and is owned by the people living in the South Whidbey School District. It is listed in the county historical registry.

Across Bayview Road from this area is a renovated Sears kit house. This house was originally built in Greenbank, and for approximately 90 years it occupied a prominent corner at Hwy 525 & Wonn Road near the Greenbank Farm, before being displaced by a highway re-alignment project. It was later renovated and moved to Bayview.

Bayview is not to be confused with Bay View, located on the mainland in Skagit County.
