= Whidbey Scenic Isle Way =

The Whidbey Scenic Isle Way is a Washington State Scenic and Recreational Highway on Whidbey Island in Island County, Washington that follows two different highways:

- SR 20 from SR 525 to Deception Pass; and
- SR 525 from the Clinton ferry terminal to SR 20
