= Greenbank, Washington =

Unincorporated community in Washington, United States

- Unincorporated community
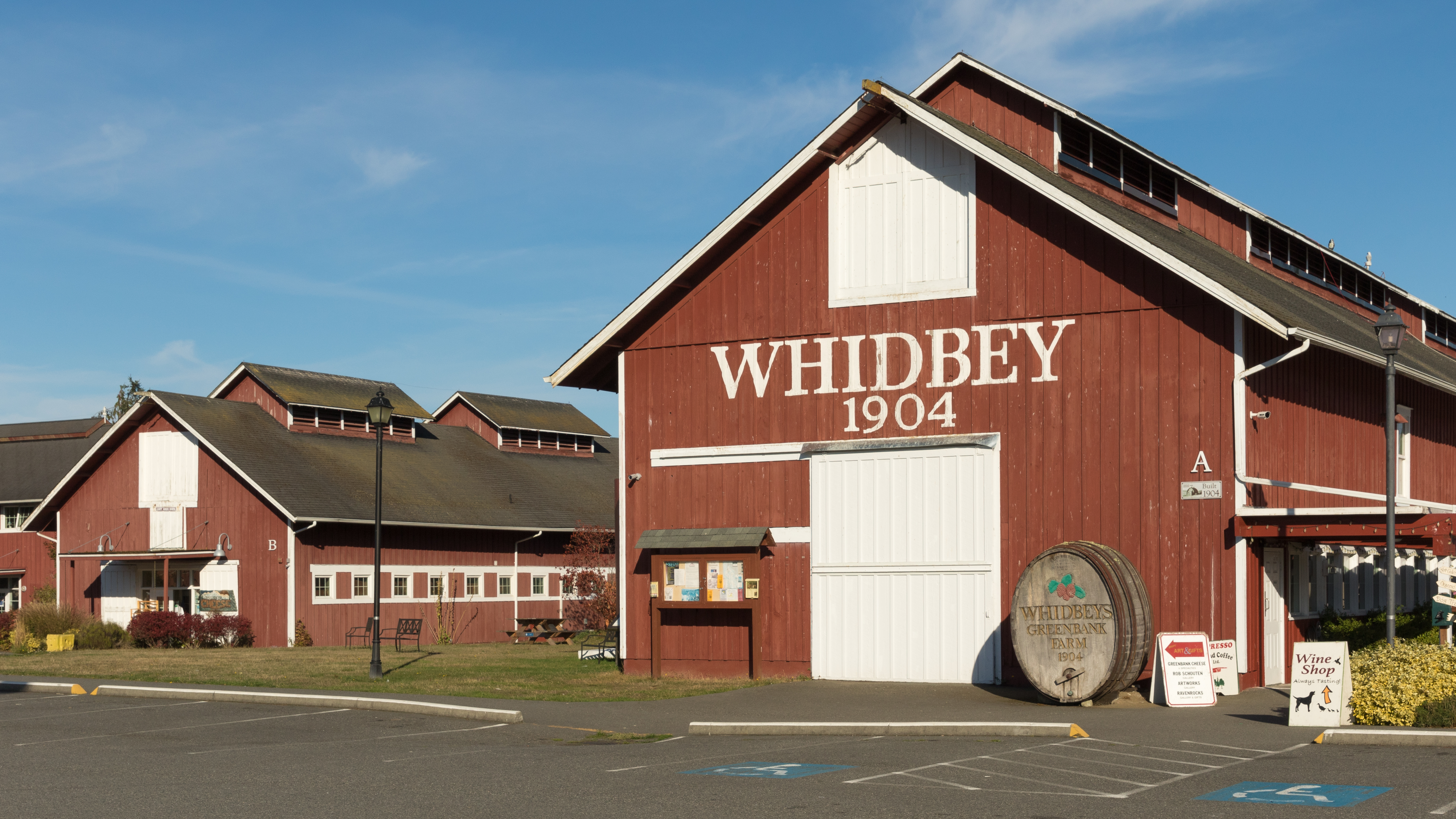
- Greenbank Farm

- Location within Washington (state) Location within the United States
- Coordinates: 48°05′53″N 122°34′23″W
- Country: United States
- State: Washington
- County: Island
- Elevation: 157 ft (48 m)
- Time zone: UTC-8 (Pacific (PST))
  - Summer (DST): UTC-7 (PDT)
- ZIP: 98253
- Area code: 360
- Telephone exchanges: 222, 678
- FIPS code: 53-04790
- GNIS feature ID: 1505281

Greenbank is an unincorporated community on Whidbey Island in Island County, Washington, United States. State Route 525 bisects the community.

== History ==
Greenbank, which was named by Calvin Philips after his homestead in Delaware, has a population around 1626. It is the location of the Greenbank Farm, once the largest loganberry farm in the world, and the Greenbank Store, which was once owned and run by the Coupe family, descendants of Captain Thomas Coupe, founder of Coupeville and is now owned and run by new owners unrelated to the Coupe family. Opening in 1904, Greenbank Store features access to the post office and a small grocery store, as well as other amenities.

== Art and culture ==
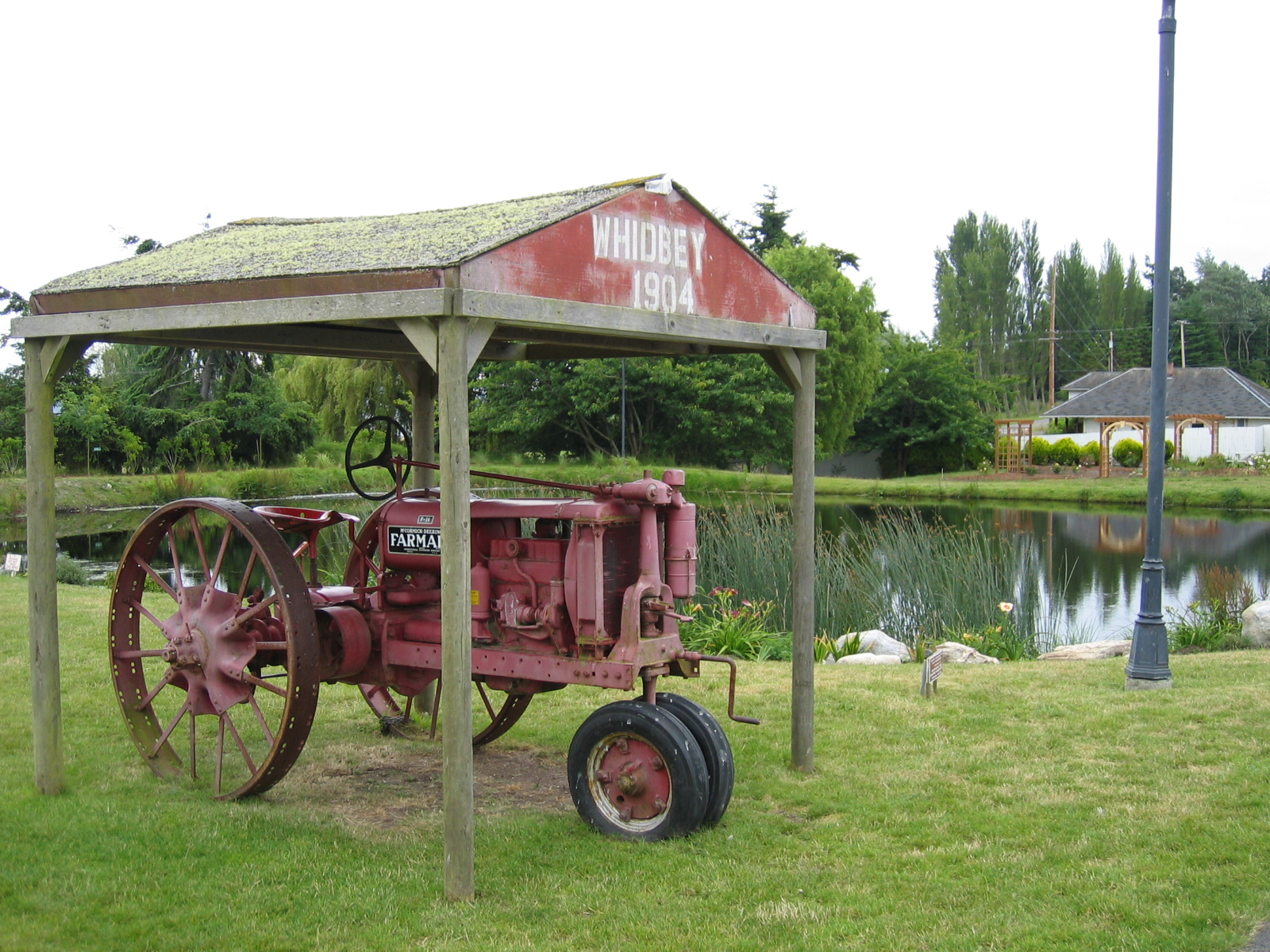
An antique tractor at Greenbank

Greenbank Farm, once the largest loganberry farm in the country, now has fields of trails and an off-leash dog area. The farm was saved from development when the Port of Coupeville agreed to purchase the 151-acre property and take on a 20-year bond payment in 1997. The purchase was completed in 2017 and continues to be operated by the Port of Coupeville.

Greenbank Farm with its large historic, “Whidbey 1904 Barn” is a popular venue for weddings, social gatherings and seasonal markets. The Shops at Greenbank Farm, independent tenants of the Port of Coupeville, are located here as well.

Other points of interest include Meerkerk Rhododendron Gardens and South Whidbey State Park.

== Environment and ecology ==
Behind the barns at the Greenbank Farm is a small marsh with a viewing platform recently built by the Whidbey Audubon Society. Many species of birds can be observed here including Red Wing Black-Birds and Warblers. Several solar projects have been implemented to reduce impact on the environment as well as offer free EV charging for all visitors.
