= Maxwelton, Washington =

Unincorporated community in Washington, US

- Unincorporated community
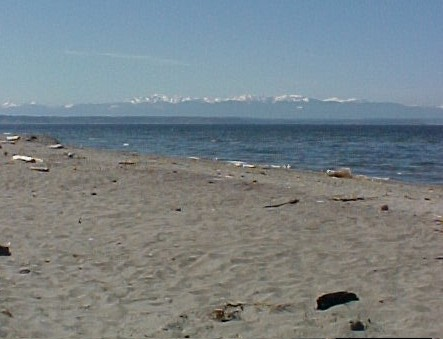
- Maxwelton Beach

- Location within Washington (state) Location within the United States
- Coordinates: 47°56′14″N 122°26′40″W
- Country: United States
- State: Washington
- County: Island
- Established: 1908
- Elevation: 10 ft (3.0 m)
- Time zone: UTC-8 (Pacific (PST))
  - Summer (DST): UTC-7 (PDT)
- Area code: 360
- GNIS feature ID: 1512437

Maxwelton is an unincorporated community located on the south end of Whidbey Island, Washington.

A post office called Maxwelton was established in 1908 and remained in operation until 1924. The community was named after Maxwelltown, in Scotland.
