= Coveland, Washington =

Unincorporated community in Washington, US

- Unincorporated community
- Location within Washington (state) Location within the United States
- Coordinates: 48°13′58″N 122°44′09″W
- Country: United States
- State: Washington
- County: Island
- Platted: 1850
- Elevation: 10 ft (3.0 m)
- Time zone: UTC-8 (Pacific (PST))
  - Summer (DST): UTC-7 (PDT)
- Area code: 360
- GNIS feature ID: 1510893

Coveland is an unincorporated community on Whidbey island in Island County, in the U.S. state of Washington.

== History ==
Coveland was laid out in 1850. The community was named for nearby Penn's Cove. A post office called Coveland was established in 1857, and remained in operation until 1881.
