= South Whidbey State Park =

State park in the U.S. state of Washington

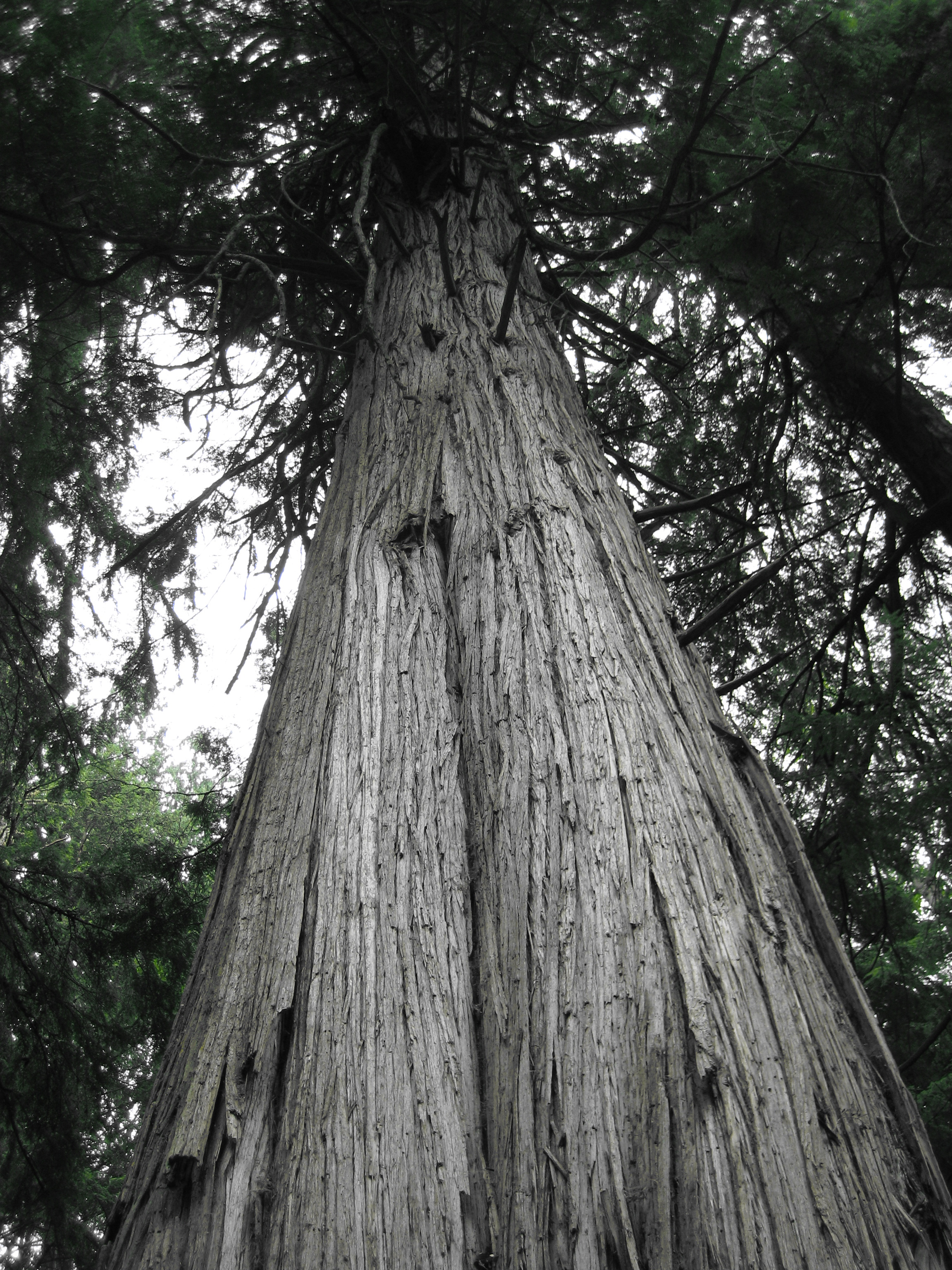
- A 500-year-old western red cedar in South Whidbey State Park

- Location within Washington (state) Location within the United States
- Location: Island County, Washington, United States
- Coordinates: 48°03′23″N 122°35′29″W
- Area: 381 acres (154 ha)
- Elevation: 210 ft (64 m)
- Established: 1960
- Administrator: Washington State Parks and Recreation Commission
- Website: Official website

South Whidbey State Park is a public recreation area consisting of 381 acres (154 ha) of old-growth forest and tidelands with 4,500 feet (1,400 m) of shoreline on Admiralty Inlet along the west shore of Whidbey Island in Island County, Washington. The state park contains many mature specimens of western red cedar, Douglas fir, Sitka spruce, and western hemlock, some of the largest on Whidbey Island, including a giant cedar over 500 years old.

== History ==
When the park was created in 1974 it consisted of approximately 87 acres of shoreline along Puget Sound. In 1977 local citizens filed a lawsuit against the Washington Department of Natural Resources, which managed the park, when they learned that the state agency planned to grant logging contracts on an adjacent 267 acre parcel of land known as "Classic U," which contained one of the few remaining stands of old-growth conifers on the island. Activists pursued legal solutions to prevent logging of the parcel, forming a nonprofit foundation called Save the Trees and seeking a temporary injunction on logging from the state government. Many also practiced civil disobedience—laying down in front of bulldozers to prevent the destruction of ancient trees.

After many years of negotiation and litigation, 255 acres of the Classic U parcel were officially added to the state park system by action of the legislature. In 1992, the parcel was officially purchased from the DNR and added to South Whidbey State Park.

In 2006 an additional 7.3 acre parcel was added to South Whidbey State Park, bringing the total acreage to 347. This land, known as the "Ryan addition" in honor of local conservationists Al and Maureen Ryan, who were instrumental in the battle to preserve the Classic U groves from logging, was purchased with funds contributed by the state Parks and Recreation Commission, the Island County Commission, and private donors in an effort organized by the non-profit Whidbey Camano Land Trust.

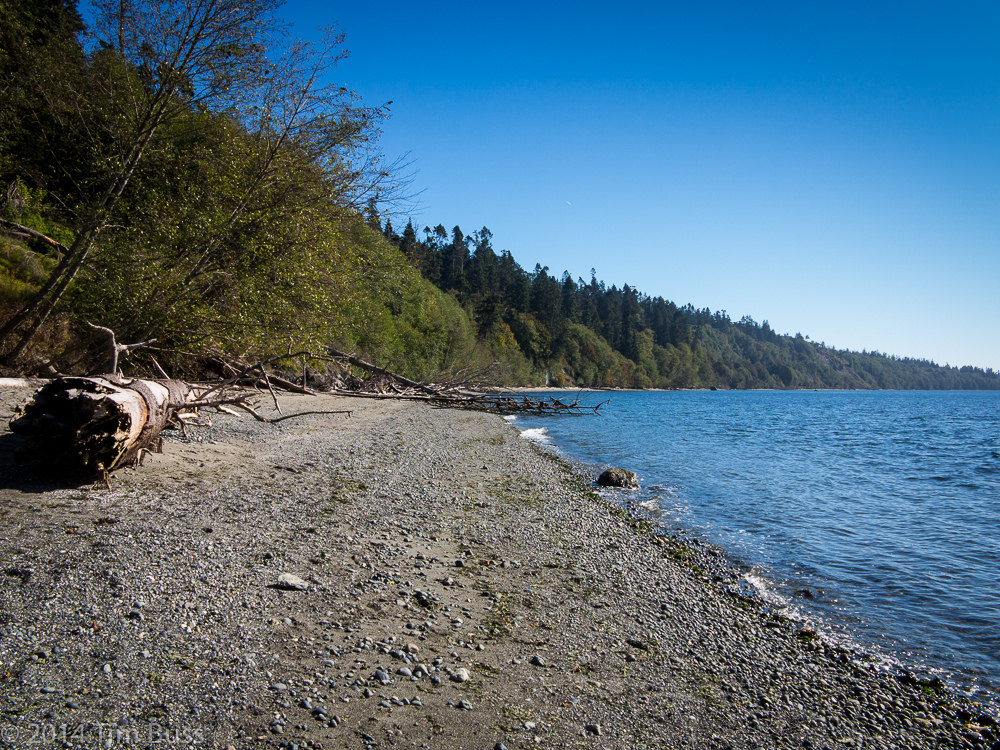
Beach at South Whidbey State Park

In 2015 the campground and overnight use of the park closed indefinitely due to dangerous conditions from “advanced levels of heart rot in the stems of large old-growth trees.”

== Amenities ==
Park activities include picnicking, hiking on 3.5 miles (5.6 km) of trails, camping, crabbing, clamming, fishing, swimming, beachcombing, birdwatching, and wildlife viewing.
