= Glendale, Washington =

Unincorporated community in Washington, US

- Unincorporated community
- Location within Washington (state) Location within the United States
- Country: United States
- State: Washington
- County: Island
- Founded: c. 1905-1907
- Elevation: 43 ft (13 m)
- Time zone: UTC-8 (Pacific (PST))
  - Summer (DST): UTC-7 (PDT)
- Area code: 360
- GNIS feature ID: 1512242

Glendale is an unincorporated community in Island County, in the U.S. state of Washington. It is located on the southeast coast of Whidbey Island, and should not be confused with the neighborhood in Seattle.

== History ==
Glendale was founded around 1907, and was descriptively named. A post office called Glendale was established in 1905, and remained in operation until 1943.
