= Price Sculpture Forest =

Outdoor collection of sculptures on Whidbey Island

- Location within Washington (state)
- Location: Whidbey Island, Washington, United States
- Nearest city: Coupeville, Washington
- Coordinates: 48.2236°N 122.6542°W
- Area: 16.3 acres
- Opened: October 23, 2020
- Founder: Scott Price
- Operator: Price Sculpture Forest
- Open: All year, from 8 am to 7 pm or sunset
- Terrain: Forest
- Website: sculptureforest.org

Price Sculpture Forest is an outdoor collection of sculptures located east of Coupeville on Whidbey Island, Washington, United States. The land is 16.3 acres and contains just over a half mile of trails. The park features two path loops through a century-old forest; one is called Nature Nurtured and features sculptures that take inspiration from nature, while the other is called Whimsy Way and features more playful sculptures. It is managed by the non-profit Price Sculpture Forest, which was established by the Price family.

== History ==
The park was created by Scott Price. He originally bought the property in 2008 with the intention of building a house for his family there. However, the family ended up building elsewhere. They wanted to sell the property, but they knew if someone bought it, it would probably be subdivided and the forest cut down. The Price family did not want that to happen. They formed a partnership with the Whidbey Camano Land Trust to preserve the natural space. They placed a conservation easement on the land, which will protect it forever from being clearcut or used for residential development.

The sculpture forest opened to the public on October 23, 2020.

== Sculptures ==
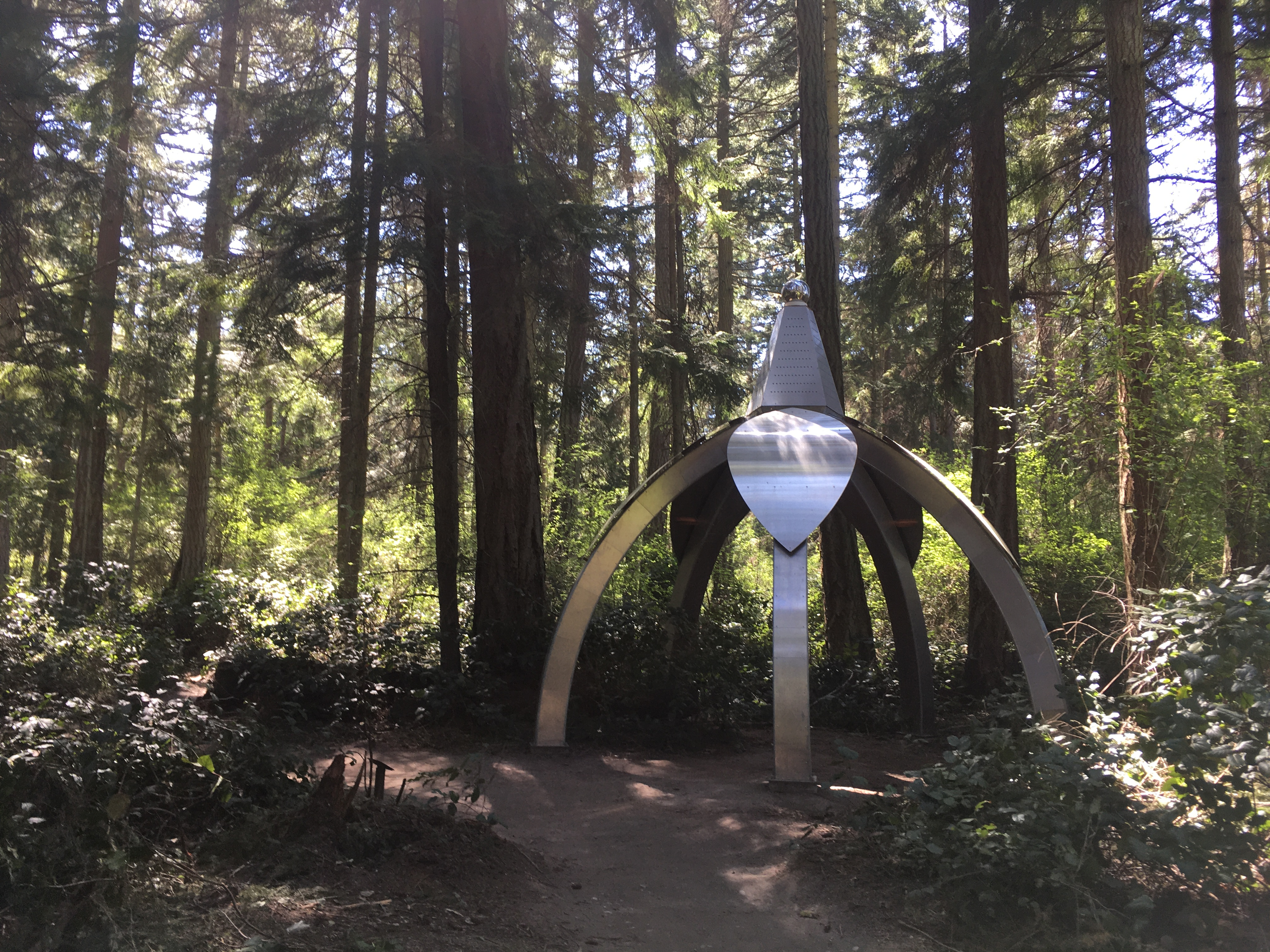
Pentillium by Gary Gunderson

As of March 2021, there are 27 sculptures in the park. Some of the pieces have been donated, some are on loan, and some are for sale.
