= San de Fuca, Washington =

Unincorporated community in Washington, US

- Unincorporated community
- Location within Washington (state) Location within the United States
- Coordinates: 48°14′6″N 122°43′23″W
- Country: United States
- State: Washington
- County: Island
- Established: late 19th century
- Elevation: 26 ft (7.9 m)
- Time zone: UTC-8 (Pacific (PST))
  - Summer (DST): UTC-7 (PDT)
- Area code: 360
- GNIS feature ID: 1513201

San de Fuca is an unincorporated community and geographical location on Whidbey Island in Island County, Washington, United States. Formerly a small town in the 19th century, it lies on the north side of Penn Cove across from Coupeville.

San de Fuca was envisioned as the terminus of a shipping channel across Whidbey Island, which would connect to Anacortes by rail. The site was said in 1890 to have "no possible rival as the most desirable and advantageous point for a general railroad terminus and point of interchange for land and water traffic." The planned canal was ultimately cancelled due to the Panic of 1893. Nonetheless, San de Fuca remained a stop on steamer lines carrying passengers to and from Seattle for several decades. The San de Fuca hotel remained standing until at least 1970, and the historic San de Fuca pier (built 1911) was still standing as of 2014.
