= Washington State Route 525 =

State highway in western Washington, US

State Route 525

- SR 525 highlighted in red

Route information
- Auxiliary route of I-5
- Maintained by WSDOT
- Length: 30.68 mi (49.37 km) Mileage does not include ferry route
- Existed: 1964–present
- Tourist routes: Cascade Loop Scenic Byway; Whidbey Scenic Isle Way

Major junctions
- South end: I-5 / I-405 in Lynnwood
- SR 99 in Lynnwood; SR 526 in Mukilteo
- North end: SR 20 near Coupeville

Location
- Country: United States
- State: Washington
- Counties: Snohomish, Island

Highway system
- State highways in Washington; Interstate; US; State; Scenic; Pre-1964; 1964 renumbering; Former
| ← SR 524 | → SR 526 |

State Route 525 (SR 525) is a 30.68-mile-long (49.37 km) state highway located in Snohomish and Island counties in the western region of the U.S. state of Washington. SR 525 begins at an interchange with Interstate 5 (I-5) and I-405 in Lynnwood and travels north to SR 99 as a four-lane controlled-access freeway. From Lynnwood, the highway serves Mukilteo and becomes the terminus of SR 526 before taking its ferry route to Clinton on Whidbey Island. SR 525 traverses the island's interior as part of the Whidbey Island Scenic Byway before the designation ends at an intersection with SR 20 south of Coupeville.

SR 525 was established during the 1964 state highway renumbering as the successor to Secondary State Highway 1D (SSH 1D) on Whidbey Island and SSH 1I in Mukilteo and Lynnwood, themselves established in 1937. The highway, at its codification in 1970, traversed the north–south length of Whidbey Island and ended at SR 536 near Anacortes until it was replaced by SR 20 in 1973. SR 525 was converted to its present freeway in Lynnwood during the 1980s and widened to four lanes during the late 1990s, including an overpass over SR 99. The highway also has a spur route in Mukilteo that has connected SR 525 to SR 526 via Paine Field Boulevard since it was signed in 2001.

== Route description ==
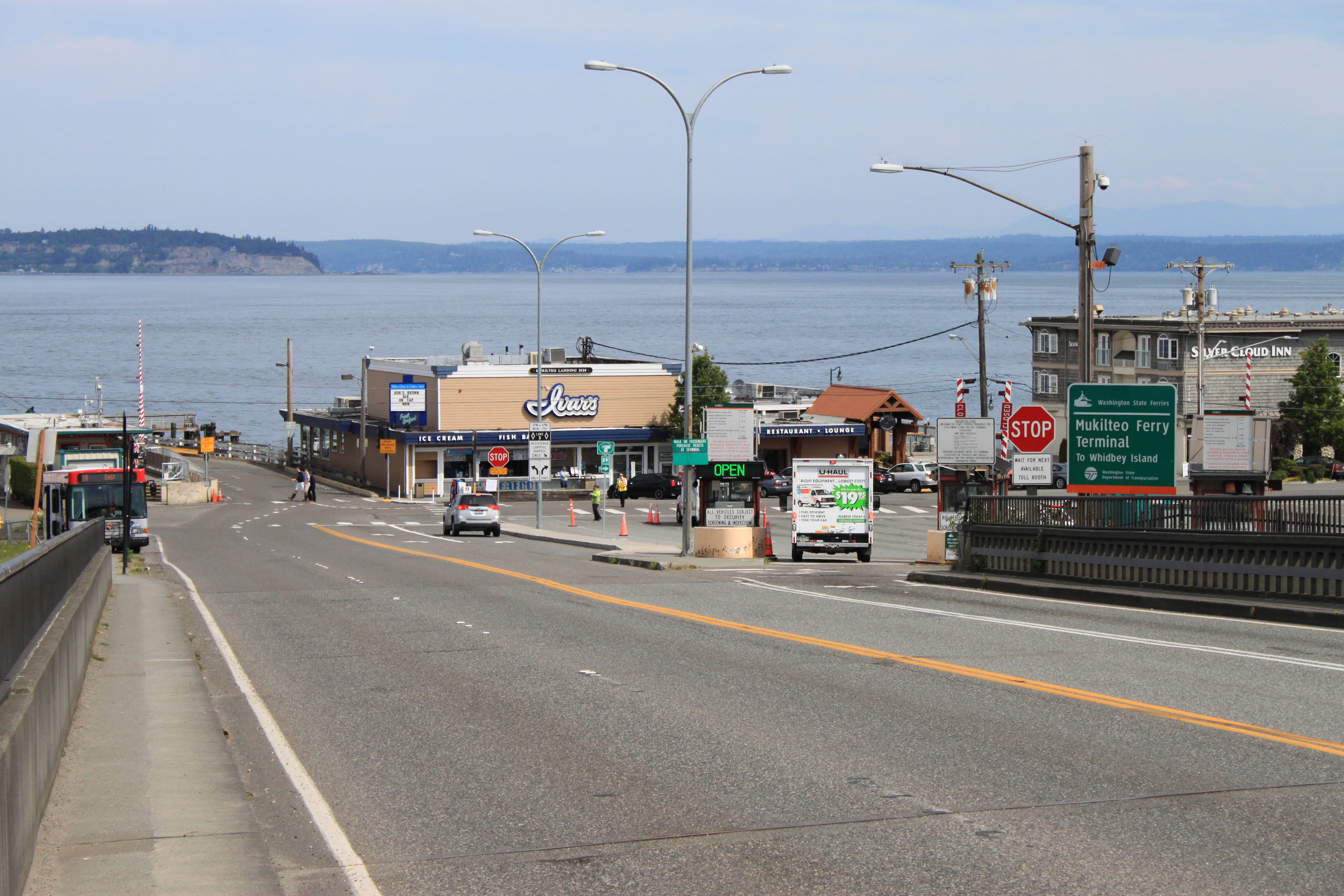
SR 525 and its holding lanes at the former Mukilteo ferry terminal

SR 525 begins at the Swamp Creek Interchange with I-5, also serving as the northern terminus of I-405, located in Lynnwood in southern Snohomish County. The four-lane controlled-access freeway travels north past Alderwood Mall and a partial cloverleaf interchange with Alderwood Mall Parkway, which serves the eponymous mall. SR 525 continues north under overpasses carrying 164th Street and 148th Street before reaching its partial cloverleaf interchange with SR 99, where the freeway ends. The highway becomes the four-lane Mukilteo Speedway and travels northwest into the city of Mukilteo, serving its commercial and industrial areas located south of Paine Field. SR 525 intersects its spur route, which travels north as Paine Field Boulevard towards the Boeing Everett Factory, before it serves as the western terminus of SR 526. The highway gains a ferry holding lane on its northbound shoulder as it approaches the Mukilteo ferry terminal, where the designation of SR 525 is carried onto the Whidbey Island Ferry across Possession Sound. The terminal is east of Mukilteo Lighthouse Park and adjacent to a train station served by Sounder commuter trains.

The Mukilteo–Clinton ferry, operated by Washington State Ferries (WSF), takes approximately 20 minutes for each of its 39 daily round-trip crossings. SR 525 leaves the ferry terminal at Clinton and travels west through the interior of Whidbey Island in unincorporated Island County as part of the Whidbey Island Scenic Byway, a state scenic byway. The highway turns north along Holmes Harbor in Freeland and continues through Greenbank before SR 525 terminates at SR 20 south of Coupeville and the Naval Outlying Landing Field Coupeville.

Every year, the Washington State Department of Transportation (WSDOT) conducts a series of surveys on its highways in the state to measure traffic volume. This is expressed in terms of annual average daily traffic (AADT), which is a measure of traffic volume for any average day of the year. In 2012, WSDOT calculated that the busiest section of SR 525 was its southern terminus at I-5 and I-405, serving 61,000 vehicles, while the least busiest section of the highway was at the Mukilteo ferry terminal, serving 5,700 vehicles. SR 525 is designated as part of the National Highway System from Lynnwood to the Mukilteo ferry terminal, classifying it as important to the national economy, defense, and mobility. WSDOT designates the entire route of SR 525 as a Highway of Statewide Significance, which includes highways that connect major communities in the state of Washington.

== History ==
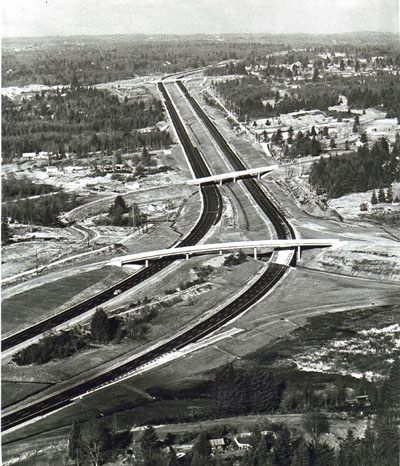
The Swamp Creek Interchange in Lynnwood, the southern terminus of SR 525 and the northern terminus of I-405, viewed from above in 1967. The overpass in the distance is 164th St. SW, where SR 525 was designated at that time.

SR 525 uses the Whidbey Island Ferry between Mukilteo and Clinton, which began as a route of the Island Transportation Company in 1919. The ferry was later taken over by the Puget Sound Navigation Company, later sold to the state government in 1951 to form the WSF. The Mukilteo and Whidbey Island highways were added to the state highway system in 1937 as SSH 1D and SSH 1I, both branches of PSH 1. SSH 1D traveled 54.73 miles (88.08 km) on Whidbey and Fidalgo islands from the Clinton ferry dock to an intersection with the Anacortes branch of PSH 1 at Sharps Corner. It was later realigned on Whidbey Island in October 1959. SSH 1I traveled 10.63 miles (17.11 km) in a circular arc from Everett to Lynnwood, traveling on Mukilteo Boulevard and the Mukilteo Speedway.

SR 525 was established during the 1964 state highway renumbering and codified in 1970 as the successor to both SSH 1D and SSH 1I. The 62.04-mile (99.84 km) highway was extended south and east from Highway 99 to the newly-completed I-5 in February 1965, using 164th Street NE until a new freeway could be constructed. The highway was truncated from Anacortes to its present terminus south of Coupeville after SR 20 was extended across the state on the North Cascades Highway in 1973. SR 525 was re-aligned onto a two-lane freeway between SR 99 and the Swamp Creek in the 1980s, extending the route to I-405. The Swamp Creek Interchange itself was completed in November 1984.

WSF ferry routes were added to its respective state highways in 1994, eliminating one of two gaps along the route of SR 525, the other being a concurrency with SR 99 that was replaced by a partial cloverleaf interchange in 2000 during the widening of the freeway segment in Lynnwood. A spur route, located completely in Mukilteo, was added to SR 525 in 2001 along the route of the four-lane Paine Field Boulevard, connecting the main highway to SR 526.

The Mukilteo ferry terminal, originally completed in 1957, was replaced by a new facility that opened on December 29, 2020. The new terminal, which includes a waiting area, longer car queues, and a transit center, cost $187 million to construct.

In April 2024, Mukilteo mayor Joe Marine floated the idea of renaming Mukilteo Speedway during a work session with the city council to better reflect the city's history; it was axed two months later after it received overwhelming opposition among participants in an online survey and a Facebook post soliciting feedback.

== Major intersections ==
| County | Location | mi | km | Destinations | Notes |
|---|---|---|---|---|---|
| Snohomish | Lynnwood | 0.00 | 0.00 | I-405 south – Bellevue | Continuation beyond I-5 |
| Snohomish | Lynnwood | 0.00 | 0.00 | I-5 – Seattle | Southern terminus, southbound exit to I-5 southbound only; I-5 exit 182 northbound |
| Snohomish | Lynnwood | 0.64 | 1.03 | Alderwood Mall Parkway | |
| Snohomish | Lynnwood | 2.76 | 4.44 | SR 99 – Everett, Lynnwood | Access to SR 99 via Lincoln Way |
| Snohomish | North end of freeway | | | | |
| Snohomish | Mukilteo | 5.77 | 9.29 | SR 525 Spur north (Paine Field Boulevard) to SR 526 | |
| Snohomish | Mukilteo | 6.68 | 10.75 | SR 526 east (84th Street Southwest) | |
| Puget Sound | | 8.64– 8.65 | 13.90– 13.92 | Clinton–Mukilteo Ferry; Mileage does not include ferry | |
| Island | | 30.68 | 49.37 | SR 20 – Coupeville, Deception Pass, Port Townsend Ferry | Northern terminus |
1.000 mi = 1.609 km; 1.000 km = 0.621 mi: Incomplete access; Route transition

== Spur route ==
State Route 525 Spur
- Location: Mukilteo, Washington
- Length: 0.86 mi (1,380 m)
- Existed: 2001–present

SR 525 has a 0.86-mile-long (1.38 km) spur route on Paine Field Boulevard in Mukilteo that connects the northbound lanes of the Mukilteo Speedway to SR 526 eastbound towards Everett and the local Boeing factory. Paine Field Boulevard was constructed as part of compensation for Boeing's expansion of the Everett factory to accommodate the 777 program in the 1990s; a bypass of the 84th Street section of SR 526 was selected in lieu of expanding SR 525. The new highway was opened in 1999 and signed as SR 525 Spur in 2001. It was subsequently widened and improved in 2003 by WSDOT. A proposal to extend Paine Field Boulevard through Japanese Gulch and create a bypass of the Mukilteo ferry terminal has been a part of the city's transportation plan since 2001, but has not been built. WSDOT estimated, during its annual AADT survey, that 21,000 vehicles used the highway in 2012.
