= Meerkerk Rhododendron Gardens =

Woodland garden in Greenbank, Washington, U.S.

Coordinates: 48.0811°N 122.5618°W

Meerkerk Gardens
- Interactive map of Meerkerk Gardens
- Location: Whidbey Island in Island County, Washington
- Founder: Ann and Max Meerkerk
- Website: www.meerkerkgardens.org

Meerkerk Rhododendron Gardens is an independent not-for-profit organization open to the public 365 days a year except during inclement weather. The Garden is located on Whidbey Island in Washington State in the United States.

The Gardens were originally built by Ann and Max Meerkerk in the early 1960s. After Ann’s death in 1979, the gardens were bequeathed to the Seattle Rhododendron Society.

The Meerkerk's legacy of 53 acres includes over 10 acre of display gardens that include hundreds of rhododendrons and an additional 43 acres of woodlands with over 2 miles of hiking trails.

== See also ==
- List of botanical gardens in the United States
