= Coupeville School District =

Public school district in Washington (state)

Coupeville School District 204 is a public school district headquartered in Coupeville, Washington, United States. It serves the central portion of Whidbey Island, including Coupeville and a small area of Freeland. As of the 2022–23 school year the district has an enrollment of 702 students.

== Schools ==
The district operates three schools and four educational programs.

- Coupeville Elementary
- Coupeville Middle School
- Coupeville High School
- Open Den, alternative high school
- Island County Juvenile Detention Education, a school within the Island County Juvenile Detention Center
