= Langley, Washington =

City in Washington, United States

Langley
- City
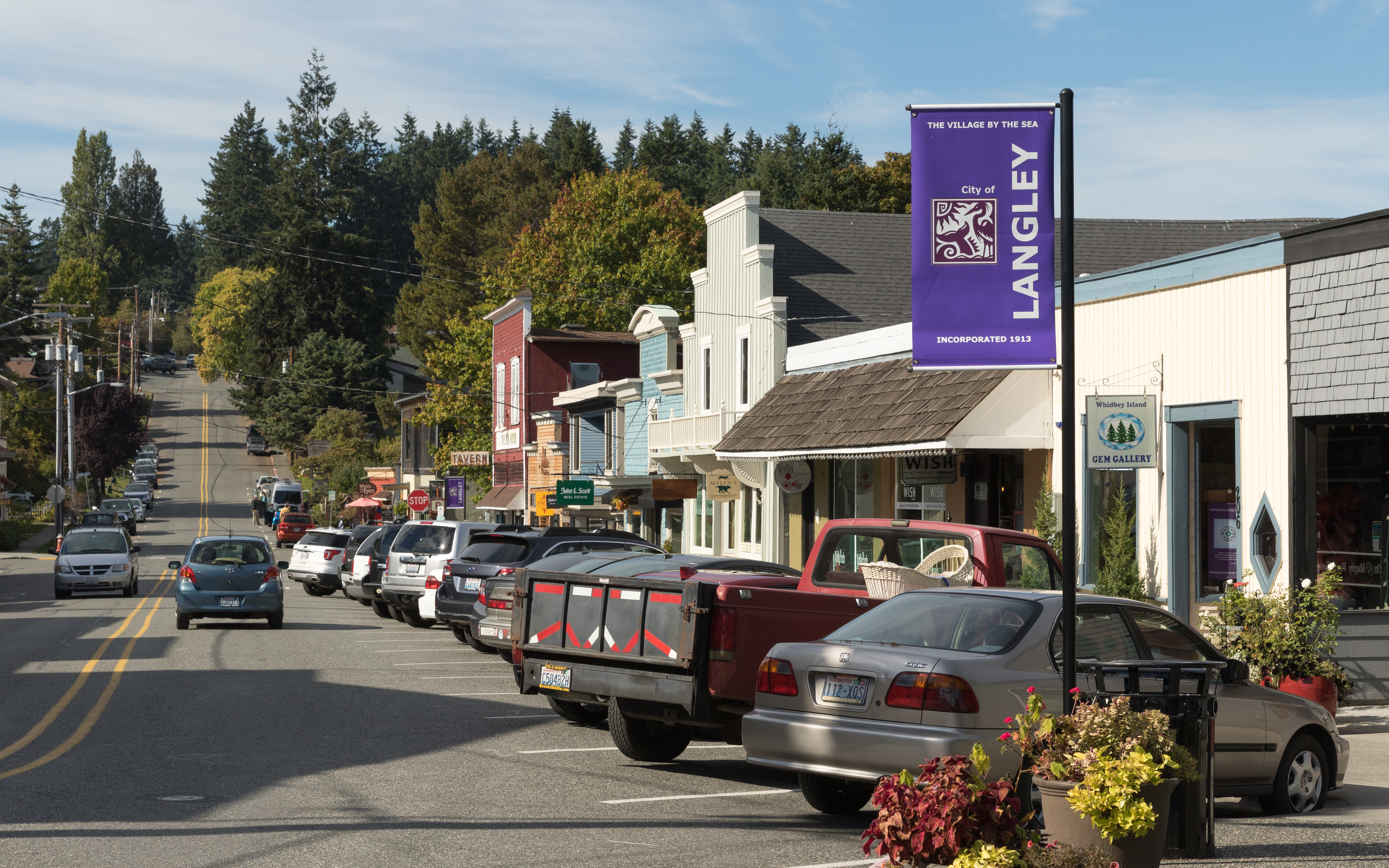
- Main Street in Langley

- Seal
- Nickname: "The Village by the Sea"
- Location of Langley in Washington
- Coordinates: 48°02′12″N 122°24′23″W
- Country: United States
- State: Washington
- County: Island
- Incorporated: February 26, 1913

Government
  - Type: Mayor–council
  - Mayor: Kennedy Horstman

Area
  - City: 1.58 sq mi (4.09 km^{2})
  - Land: 1.01 sq mi (2.61 km^{2})
  - Water: 0.57 sq mi (1.48 km^{2})
  - Metro: 26.20 sq mi (67.86 km^{2})
- Elevation: 102 ft (31 m)

Population (2020)
  - City: 1,147
  - Density: 1,140/sq mi (439/km^{2})
- Demonym: Langleyite
- Time zone: UTC-8 (PST)
  - Summer (DST): UTC-7 (PDT)
- ZIP Code: 98260
- Area code(s): 360, 564
- FIPS code: 53-38355
- GNIS feature ID: 2411623
- Annual budget: 2012, approximately $5.5 million
- Website: City of Langley

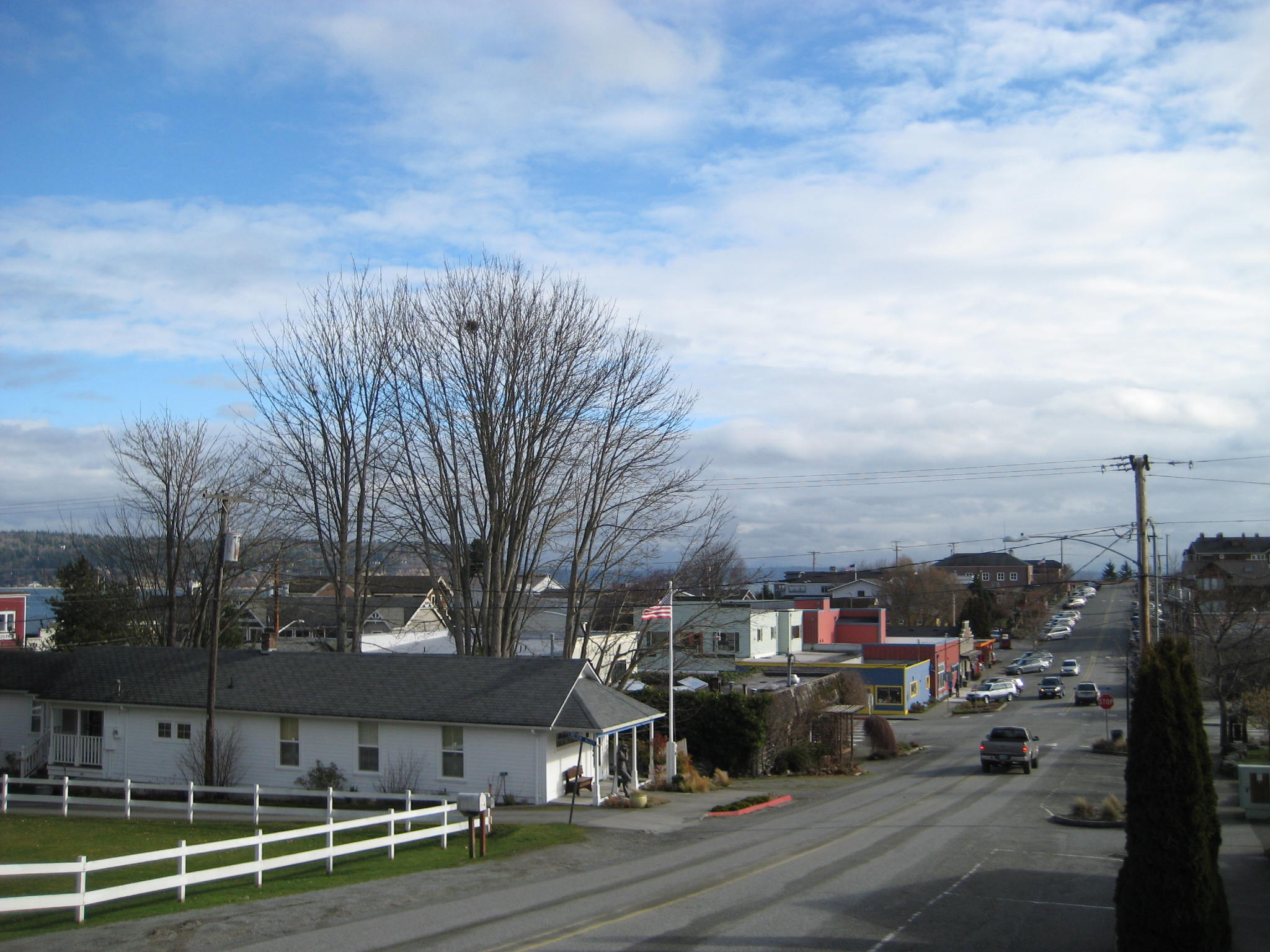
Downtown Langley from Second Street

Langley is a city in Island County, Washington, United States. It sits at the south end of Whidbey Island, overlooking Saratoga Passage. The 2020 census, the population increased to 1,147 people. Langley proper only covers 0.8 square miles (2.1 km^{2}), but its ZCTA extends for 26.20 square miles (67.9 km^{2}).

Snohomish people historically camped near the modern-day site of Langley and had a village at Sandy Point. They were removed to the Tulalip Reservation in the late 1800s, and the village was abandoned. The modern settlement of Langley was founded in the 1890s by Jacob Anthes, and the town was incorporated in 1913.

== History ==
=== Pre-contact ===
Snohomish people have inhabited south Whidbey Island for thousands of years. Langley is known in the Lushootseed language as sc̓q̓abac, (Note: also spelled sc̓əq̓abac or c̓əq̓abac) meaning "gooseberry bush."

The site of Langley was a camping spot used during clam harvesting in the summer months. Nearby, there was a village of the dəgʷasx̌abš, a Snohomish band, approximately one mile east of Langley on Sandy Point (Lushootseed: č̓əč̓ɬqs). (Note: meaning "ripped nose") This village had a large potlatch house, which brought visitors, even as distant as the Samish, during festivities.

In the 18th and 19th centuries, smallpox epidemics rocked the Northwest Coast, killing 90 percent of the population. In 1792, the village at č̓əč̓ɬqs was seen by Joseph Whidbey, who noted that the population seemed to be about 200 people. Later, the village would be abandoned in the late 1800s after the removal of the Snohomish people to the Tulalip Reservation.

=== American settlement ===
Langley was founded in the 1890s by Jacob Anthes, and was named for J.W. Langley of Seattle. In 1902, Anthes built a logger bunkhouse that still stands in the downtown core (now functioning as the South Whidbey Historical Society Museum). Langley was officially incorporated on February 26, 1913.

In the late 1900s, a number of 4H rabbits escaped their enclosures at the Island County Fair and went on to thrive as a large feral population initially residing around the county fairgrounds and later spreading throughout Langley and south Whidbey Island. In the 2010s the rabbits became a controversial issue in local politics, with citizens and groups advocating for public policy positions from removal and relocation to eradication. Some favored controlling the rabbit population using raptors, while others advocated for a more lenient position of community acceptance. Several diseases decimated the feral rabbit population between 2021 and 2023. The majority of the rabbits to service were native species; however, a very small number of feral rabbits have been seen in the summers of 2024 and 2025.

=== The Olympic Club ===
The Dog House was opened in 1908 as an elite gentlemen's club called "The Olympic Club". However, on opening night the founder realized that he didn't have enough money to pay the entertainers, so he left town with all the money. Over the years, the building has acted as host to many businesses.

During the Prohibition era, the building was host to underground boxing and wrestling matches which were illegal on the mainland.

When Prohibition ended, the club became a public bar, and operated as a restaurant and bar until its closure in 2008. The Clyde Theatre began in the top floor of this building.

The building has been undergoing massive renovations by the new owners since the early 2010s. They are hoping to be able to reopen the building to business by 2027.

== Geography ==
According to the United States Census Bureau, the city has a total area of 1.08 square miles (2.80 km^{2}), all of it land.

== Demographics ==
Historical population
Census	Pop.	Note	%±
1920	274		—
1930	268		−2.2%
1940	338		26.1%
1950	427		26.3%
1960	448		4.9%
1970	547		22.1%
1980	650		18.8%
1990	845		30.0%
2000	959		13.5%
2010	1,035		7.9%
2020	1,147		10.8%
U.S. Decennial Census

=== 2020 census ===
As of the 2020 census, Langley had a population of 1,147. The median age was 63.5 years. 12.0% of residents were under the age of 18 and 47.7% of residents were 65 years of age or older. For every 100 females there were 72.7 males, and for every 100 females age 18 and over there were 73.1 males age 18 and over.

99.0% of residents lived in urban areas, while 1.0% lived in rural areas.

There were 630 households in Langley, of which 16.5% had children under the age of 18 living in them. Of all households, 38.6% were married-couple households, 17.5% were households with a male householder and no spouse or partner present, and 37.5% were households with a female householder and no spouse or partner present. About 41.8% of all households were made up of individuals and 30.2% had someone living alone who was 65 years of age or older.

There were 743 housing units, of which 15.2% were vacant. The homeowner vacancy rate was 0.5% and the rental vacancy rate was 4.4%.

Racial composition as of the 2020 census
Race	Number	Percent
White	1,011	88.1%
Black or African American	8	0.7%
American Indian and Alaska Native	8	0.7%
Asian	16	1.4%
Native Hawaiian and Other Pacific Islander	1	0.1%
Some other race	17	1.5%
Two or more races	86	7.5%
Hispanic or Latino (of any race)	58	5.1%

=== 2010 census ===
As of the 2010 census, there were 1,035 people, 555 households, and 271 families residing in the city. The population density was 958.3 inhabitants per square mile (370.0/km^{2}). There were 678 housing units at an average density of 627.8 per square mile (242.4/km^{2}). The racial makeup of the city was 94.1% White, 0.1% African American, 0.6% Native American, 1.6% Asian, 0.1% Pacific Islander, 0.7% from other races, and 2.8% from two or more races. Hispanic or Latino people of any race were 3.2% of the population.

Of the 555 households, 16.6% had children under the age of 18 living with them, 39.1% were married couples living together, 7.6% had a female householder with no husband present, 2.2% had a male householder with no wife present, and 51.2% were non-families. 43.6% of all households were made up of individuals, and 23.6% had someone living alone who was 65 years of age or older. The average household size was 1.86 and the average family size was 2.51.

The median age in the city was 57 years. 14% of residents were under the age of 18; 3.4% were between the ages of 18 and 24; 14.4% were from 25 to 44; 39.8% were from 45 to 64; and 28.4% were 65 years of age or older. The gender makeup of the city was 40.9% male and 59.1% female.

=== 2000 census ===
As of the 2000 census, there were 959 people, 486 households, and 268 families residing in the city. The population density was 1,165.9 people per square mile (451.6/km^{2}). There were 542 housing units at an average density of 658.9 per square mile (255.2/km^{2}). The racial makeup of the city was 96.25% White, 0.31% African American, 0.42% Native American, 0.52% Asian, 0.42% from other races, and 2.09% from two or more races. Hispanic or Latino of any race were 1.88% of the population.

There were 486 households, out of which 24.3% included children under the age of 18, 40.9% were married couples living together, 12.1% had a female householder with no husband present, and 44.7% were non-families. 39.9% of all households were made up of individuals, and 21.2% had someone living alone who was 65 years of age or older. The average household size was 1.97 and the average family size was 2.61.

19.7% of the population was under the age of 18, 5.8% from 18 to 24, 15.7% from 25 to 44, 35.5% from 45 to 64, and 23.3% who were 65 years of age or older. The median age was 49 years. For every 100 females, there were 76.9 males. For every 100 women age 18 and over, there were 72.3 men.

The median income for a household in the city was $34,792, and the median income for a family was $51,563. Men had a median income of $41,750 versus $30,125 for women. The per capita income for the city was $24,940. About 5.2% of families and 10.6% of the population were below the poverty threshold, including 10.7% of those under age 18 and 6.6% of those age 65 or over.

== Arts and culture ==
=== Events ===
Mystery Weekend is an annual mystery game where players to seek out characters played by local residents.

The annual Whidbey Island Area Fair was founded in 1912.

Choochokam was an event that ran for annually in the town from 1975 to 2015, before a sudden cancellation of the 2016 festival. It was held on a July weekend and was Langley's largest street fair.

=== Library ===
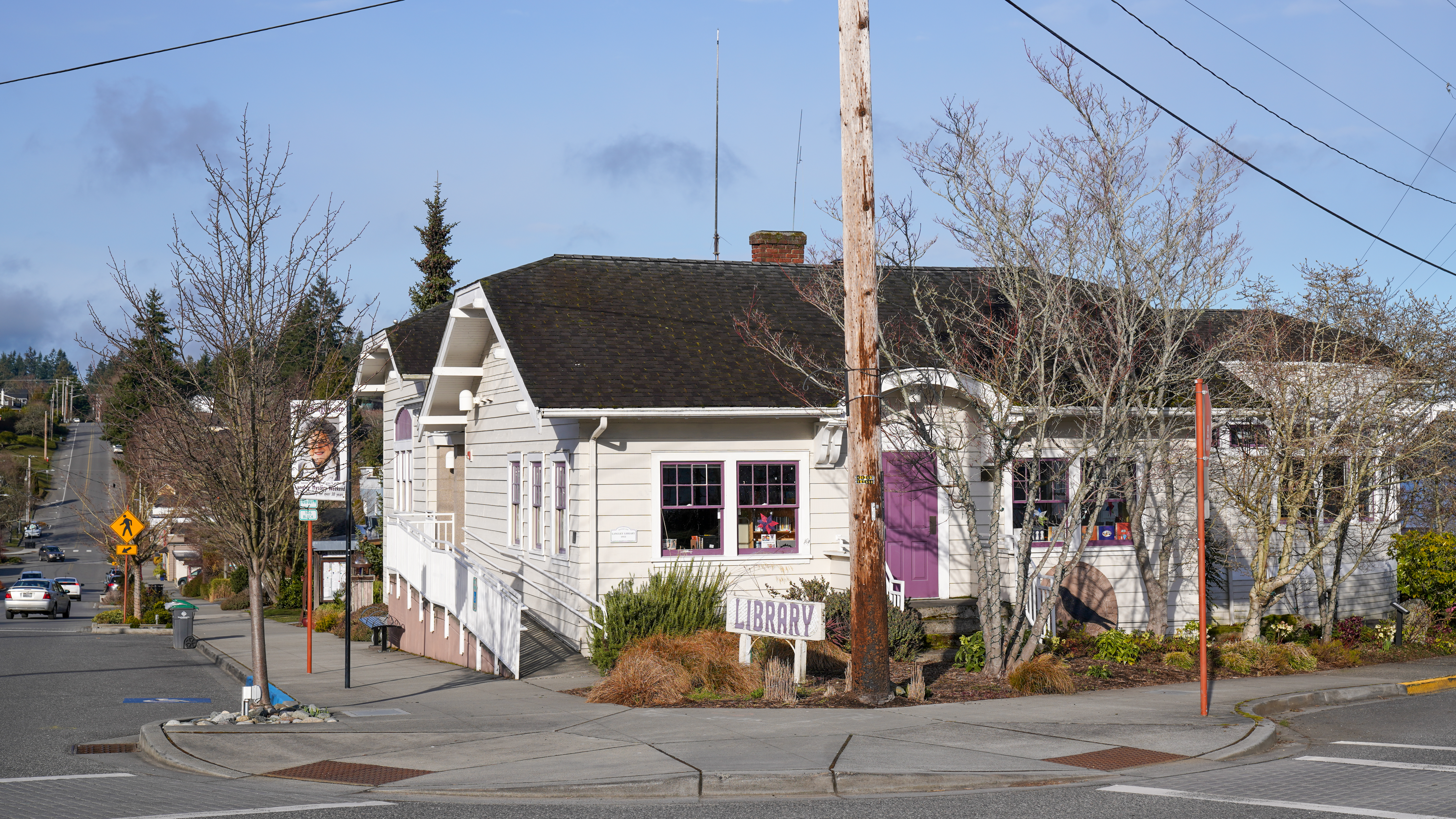
The Langley Library, part of the Sno-Isle Libraries system

The Langley Library was constructed in 1923 and has been a branch of the Sno-Isle Libraries system since an annexation in 2010. The 3,600 sq ft (330 m^{2}) building was temporarily closed in February 2024 for a renovation and expansion project. The existing lower level was expanded by 1,400 sq ft (130 m^{2}) to add public spaces; solar panels were also added to the roof. The library reopened in March 2025.

== Parks and recreation ==
Langley Marina includes a boat launch and fuel pump.

== Government ==
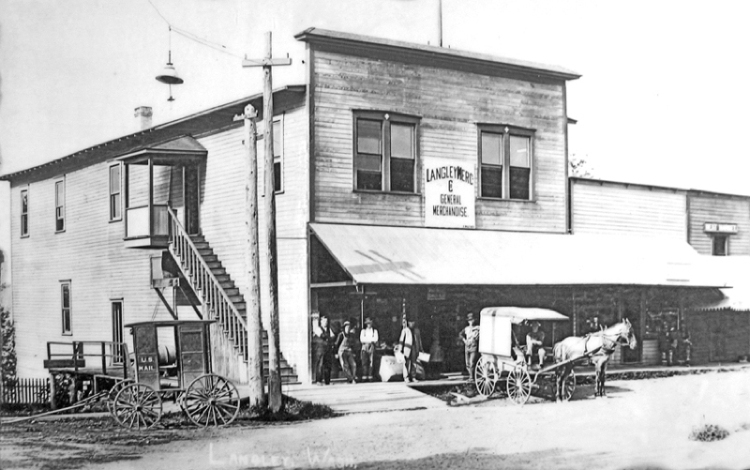
The Dog House

Langley operates under a mayor–council government. The mayor and city council members are elected for four-year terms. The city council enacts ordinances and resolutions, holds public hearings, receives citizen comments, authorizes payment of city funds, approves contracts, and creates committees and boards to assist in the operation of city government.

The current mayor is Kennedy Horstman, who was elected in November 2023.

== Education ==
Langley is in the South Whidbey School District.

=== School history ===
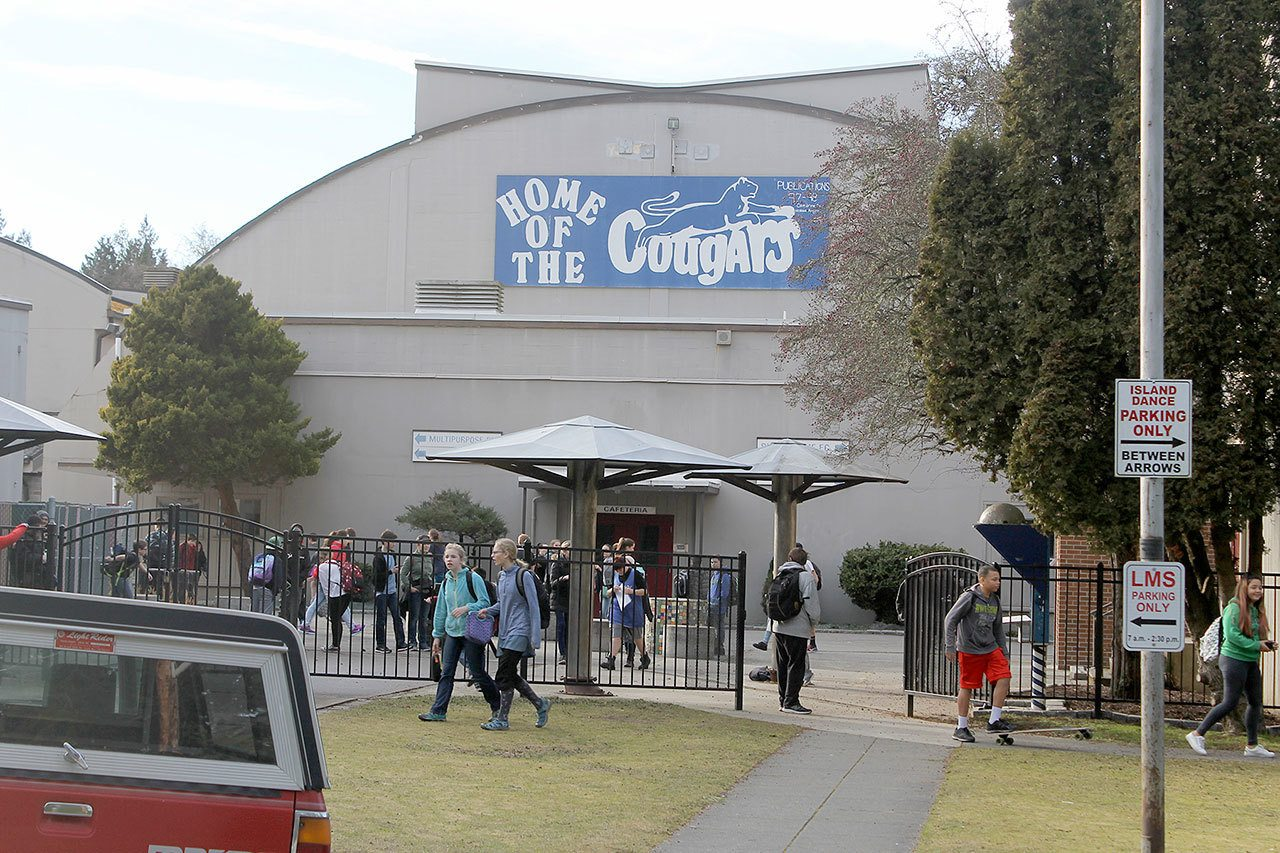
Langley Middle School

The first school constructed in Langley, the original Langley High School and later the Langley Middle School after the new High School was constructed, closed permanently in 2017 and is now managed by local nonprofits and companies.

The main building has been converted into an artistic community classroom, known as the South Whidbey Community Center.

The gym has been converted into a CrossFit studio. The football field and track and field area are still maintained by the Community Center, and the science building is now home to the Veteran's Resource Center of South Whidbey.

Whidbey Children's Theatre is housed in the former school auditorium.

The library is now home to the Whidbey Dance Theatre and the Island Dance Studio.

=== High School ===
The high school absorbed grades 7–8 with the closure of the middle school in 2017. In 2023, grade 6 joined the high school building, as well. Grades 6-12 are now housed at the high school.

== Infrastructure ==
Langley has a sewage treatment facility operated by the city's Public Works Department.

Langley is served by South Whidbey Fire/Emergency Medical Services, the Langley Police Department, and South Whidbey School District #206; the school district offices are located there.
