= Island County, Washington =

County in Washington, United States

- County
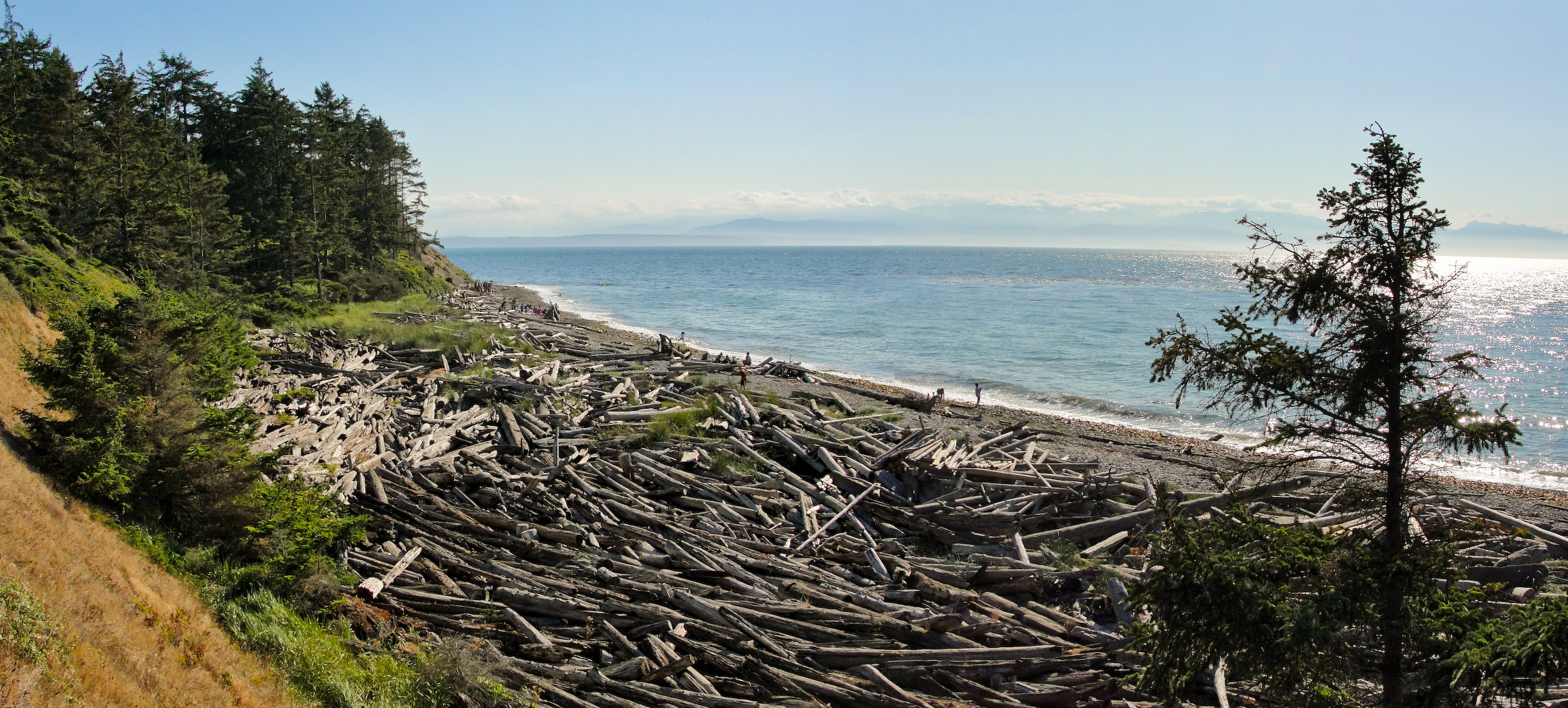
- Shoreline at Fort Ebey State Park within U.S. Ebey's Landing National Historical Reserve on Whidbey Island

- Location within the U.S. state of Washington
- Coordinates: 48°09′N 122°35′W
- Country: United States
- State: Washington
- Founded: 1852
- Seat: Coupeville
- Largest city: Oak Harbor

Area
  - Total: 517 sq mi (1,340 km^{2})
  - Land: 208 sq mi (540 km^{2})
  - Water: 309 sq mi (800 km^{2}) 60%

Population (2020)
  - Total: 86,857
  - Estimate (2025): 85,657 ▼
  - Density: 381/sq mi (147/km^{2})
- Time zone: UTC−8 (Pacific)
  - Summer (DST): UTC−7 (PDT)
- Congressional district: 2nd
- Website: islandcountywa.gov

Island County is a county located in the U.S. state of Washington. As of the 2020 census, its population was 86,857. Its county seat is Coupeville, while its largest city is Oak Harbor.

The county's name reflects the fact that it is composed entirely of islands. It contains two large islands, Whidbey and Camano, and seven smaller islands (Baby, Ben Ure, Deception, Kalamut, Minor, Smith, and Strawberry). Island County was created out of Thurston County on December 22, 1852, by the legislature of Oregon Territory, and is the eighth-oldest county in Washington. It originally encompassed what are now Snohomish, Skagit, Whatcom, and San Juan Counties.

Island County comprises the Oak Harbor, Washington Micropolitan Statistical Area, which is also included in the Seattle–Tacoma, WA Combined Statistical Area.

== Geography ==
According to the United States Census Bureau, the county has a total area of 517 square miles (1,340 km^{2}), of which 208 square miles (540 km^{2}) is land and 309 square miles (800 km^{2}) (60%) is water. It is the second smallest county in Washington by land area after San Juan, and second smallest by total area after Wahkiakum.

=== Geographic features ===
- Puget Sound
- Strait of Juan de Fuca
- Whidbey Island
- Camano Island
- Saratoga Passage

=== National protected areas ===
- Pacific Northwest National Scenic Trail (part)
- Ebey's Landing National Historical Reserve

=== Adjacent counties ===
- Jefferson County - west
- San Juan County - north & west
- Kitsap County - south & west
- Skagit County - north & east
- Snohomish County - south & east

== Demographics ==
Historical population
Census	Pop.	Note	%±
1860	294		—
1870	626		112.9%
1880	1,087		73.6%
1890	1,787		64.4%
1900	1,870		4.6%
1910	4,704		151.6%
1920	5,489		16.7%
1930	5,369		−2.2%
1940	6,098		13.6%
1950	11,079		81.7%
1960	19,638		77.3%
1970	27,011		37.5%
1980	44,048		63.1%
1990	60,195		36.7%
2000	71,558		18.9%
2010	78,506		9.7%
2020	86,857		10.6%
2025 (est.)	85,657	▼	−1.4%
U.S. Decennial Census; 1790–1960 1900–1990; 1990–2000 2010–2020

=== 2020 census ===
As of the 2020 census, there were 86,857 people, 35,917 households, and 24,229 families living in the county. The population density was 416.6 inhabitants per square mile (160.9/km^{2}).

Of the residents, 18.1% were under the age of 18 and 26.2% were 65 years of age or older; the median age was 45.8 years. For every 100 females there were 98.2 males, and for every 100 females age 18 and over there were 97.0 males. 52.2% of residents lived in urban areas and 47.8% lived in rural areas.

Island County, Washington – Racial and ethnic composition Note: the US Census treats Hispanic/Latino as an ethnic category. This table excludes Latinos from the racial categories and assigns them to a separate category. Hispanics/Latinos may be of any race.
Race / Ethnicity (NH = Non-Hispanic)	Pop 2000	Pop 2010	Pop 2020	% 2000	% 2010	% 2020
White alone (NH)	60,929	65,209	65,856	85.15%	83.06%	75.82%
Black or African American alone (NH)	1,634	1,641	2,265	2.28%	2.09%	2.61%
Native American or Alaska Native alone (NH)	639	561	543	0.89%	0.71%	0.63%
Asian alone (NH)	2,941	3,377	3,916	4.11%	4.30%	4.51%
Pacific Islander alone (NH)	291	370	414	0.41%	0.47%	0.48%
Other race alone (NH)	159	110	562	0.22%	0.14%	0.65%
Mixed race or Multiracial (NH)	2,122	2,943	6,183	2.97%	3.75%	7.12%
Hispanic or Latino (any race)	2,843	4,295	7,118	3.97%	5.47%	8.20%
Total	71,558	78,506	86,857	100.00%	100.00%	100.00%

The racial makeup of the county was 78.2% White, 2.8% Black or African American, 0.8% American Indian and Alaska Native, 4.6% Asian, 2.7% from some other race, and 10.4% from two or more races. Hispanic or Latino residents of any race comprised 8.2% of the population.

Of the 35,917 households, 24.1% had children under the age of 18 living with them and 22.4% had a female householder with no spouse or partner present. About 25.9% of all households were made up of individuals and 13.6% had someone living alone who was 65 years of age or older. There were 41,922 housing units at an average density of 201.1 inhabitants per square mile (77.6/km^{2}), of which 14.3% were vacant. Among occupied housing units, 73.7% were owner-occupied and 26.3% were renter-occupied. The homeowner vacancy rate was 1.1% and the rental vacancy rate was 5.9%.

=== 2010 census ===
As of the 2010 census, there were 78,506 people, 32,746 households, and 22,156 families living in the county. The population density was 376.6 inhabitants per square mile (145.4/km^{2}). There were 40,234 housing units at an average density of 193.0 per square mile (74.5/km^{2}). The racial makeup of the county was 86.1% white, 4.4% Asian, 2.2% black or African American, 0.8% American Indian, 0.5% Pacific islander, 1.5% from other races, and 4.5% from two or more races. Those of Hispanic or Latino origin made up 5.5% of the population. The largest ancestry groups were:

- 21.4% German
- 14.3% Irish
- 14.0% English
- 6.1% Norwegian
- 4.5% Scottish
- 4.3% French
- 4.1% Dutch
- 4.0% Swedish
- 4.0% American
- 3.6% Mexican
- 3.5% Italian
- 2.9% Filipino
- 2.5% Scotch-Irish
- 2.1% Polish
- 1.6% Welsh
- 1.5% Danish

Of the 32,746 households, 27.3% had children under the age of 18 living with them, 56.6% were married couples living together, 7.9% had a female householder with no husband present, 32.3% were non-families, and 25.9% of all households were made up of individuals. The average household size was 2.35 and the average family size was 2.81. The median age was 43.2 years.

The median income for a household in the county was $57,190 and the median income for a family was $68,106. Males had a median income of $46,801 versus $35,189 for females. The per capita income for the county was $29,079. About 5.7% of families and 8.0% of the population were below the poverty line, including 12.1% of those under age 18 and 4.0% of those age 65 or over.

== Transportation ==
The primary islands of Island County, Whidbey Island and Camano Island are served by a total of 3 Washington State Routes, those being SR 20 and SR 525 on Whidbey Island, and SR 532 on Camano Island. SR 20 enters Island County via the Port Townsend-Coupeville (Keystone) ferry route from the West, and departs via the Deception Pass Bridge in the North. SR 525 enters Island County from the East/South via the Mukilteo-Clinton ferry and terminates at an intersection with SR 20, South of Coupeville. SR 532 begins on Camano Island at Terry's Corner and departs Island County to the East via the Camano Gateway Bridge.

These islands are also served by a fare-free/pre-paid bus service called Island Transit.

== Government and politics ==
The county government is led by a board of commissioners with three elected members that represent geographical regions of Island County.

Island County is divided politically between its north and south. While the north (Oak Harbor) is conservative – Donald Trump received almost 55 percent of the 2016 vote and carried most precincts – most southern and central precincts voted for Hillary Clinton. The south-central area (Coupeville, Langley) voted over 50 percent for Clinton, just over 30 percent for Trump.

In 2024, despite the country and state of Washington shifting to the right, Democratic nominee Kamala Harris improved in the county and had one of the best performances in its history, winning 56.43% of the vote. Harris outperformed Lyndon B. Johnson's 1964 landslide performance, and was only exceeded by Franklin D. Roosevelt's 1932 and 1936 performances.

United States presidential election results for Island County, Washington
Year	Republican		Democratic		Third party(ies)	
Year	No.	%	No.	%	No.	%
1892	161	40.66%	127	32.07%	108	27.27%
1896	206	50.86%	191	47.16%	8	1.98%
1900	263	62.62%	123	29.29%	34	8.10%
1904	424	71.99%	83	14.09%	82	13.92%
1908	450	58.21%	192	24.84%	131	16.95%
1912	332	21.11%	310	19.71%	931	59.19%
1916	804	43.58%	855	46.34%	186	10.08%
1920	883	51.19%	285	16.52%	557	32.29%
1924	832	46.25%	114	6.34%	853	47.42%
1928	1,487	71.25%	556	26.64%	44	2.11%
1932	803	30.17%	1,517	56.99%	342	12.85%
1936	921	32.74%	1,687	59.97%	205	7.29%
1940	1,371	44.85%	1,626	53.19%	60	1.96%
1944	1,487	46.66%	1,662	52.15%	38	1.19%
1948	1,805	49.05%	1,694	46.03%	181	4.92%
1952	2,901	61.68%	1,772	37.68%	30	0.64%
1956	3,196	61.20%	2,009	38.47%	17	0.33%
1960	3,596	59.01%	2,470	40.53%	28	0.46%
1964	3,044	43.49%	3,946	56.38%	9	0.13%
1968	4,077	50.96%	3,238	40.48%	685	8.56%
1972	7,495	68.12%	3,149	28.62%	359	3.26%
1976	7,804	55.33%	5,859	41.54%	441	3.13%
1980	10,926	58.87%	5,422	29.21%	2,211	11.91%
1984	13,548	65.72%	6,850	33.23%	218	1.06%
1988	12,552	58.78%	8,510	39.85%	291	1.36%
1992	9,526	35.06%	9,555	35.17%	8,087	29.77%
1996	12,387	43.52%	12,157	42.71%	3,920	13.77%
2000	16,408	49.72%	14,778	44.78%	1,818	5.51%
2004	19,754	51.23%	18,216	47.24%	589	1.53%
2008	19,426	46.08%	22,058	52.32%	675	1.60%
2012	19,605	46.57%	21,478	51.02%	1,016	2.41%
2016	18,465	41.71%	20,960	47.34%	4,848	10.95%
2020	22,746	42.18%	29,213	54.17%	1,966	3.65%
2024	20,967	39.98%	29,595	56.43%	1,887	3.60%

== Communities ==
=== Cities ===
- Langley
- Oak Harbor

=== Town ===
- Coupeville (county seat)

=== Census-designated places ===
- Camano
- Clinton
- Freeland
- Whidbey Island Station, formerly listed as Ault Field

=== Other unincorporated communities ===
- Austin
- Baby Island Heights
- Bayview
- Bells Beach
- Beverly Beach
- Bretland
- Camp Diana
- Columbia Beach
- Coveland
- Glendale
- Greenbank
- Juniper Beach
- Keystone
- Lagoon Point
- Mabana
- Maxwelton
- Midvale Corner
- Northgate Terrace
- Pebble Beach
- Penn Cove Park
- Pioneer Blueberries
- Possession
- Rodena Beach
- San De Fuca
- Sandy Hook
- Saratoga
- Sheliegh Estates
- Smith Prairie
- Sunlight Beach
- Sunny Shore Acres
- Tyee Beach
- Utsalady

Juniper Beach, a wedding ceremony locale in past years, has given its name to the Juniper Beach Water District.

== Education ==
Island County has four school districts that provide public K–12 education to areas of the county: Coupeville School District, Oak Harbor School District, South Whidbey School District, and Stanwood-Camano School District.

== See also ==
- National Register of Historic Places listings in Island County, Washington
