= Whidbey Island =

Island in Puget Sound in Washington, United States

Native name: čaʔkʷulči Nickname: "The Rock"
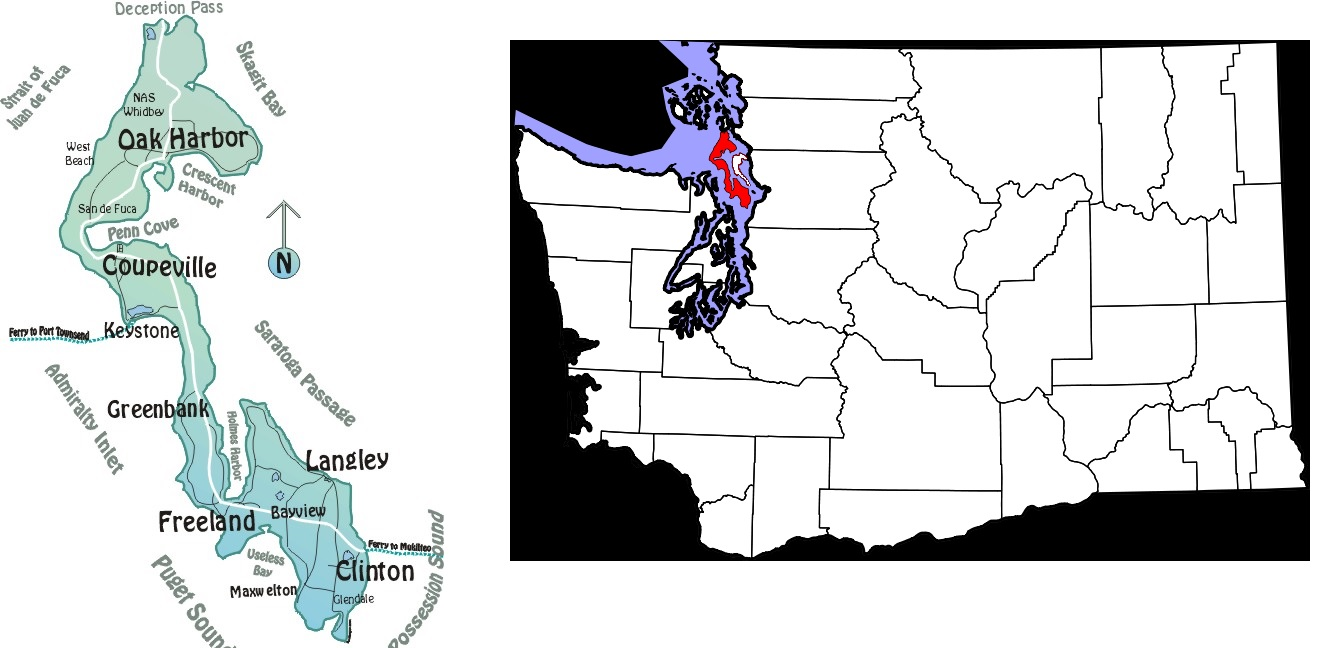
- Location of Whidbey Island

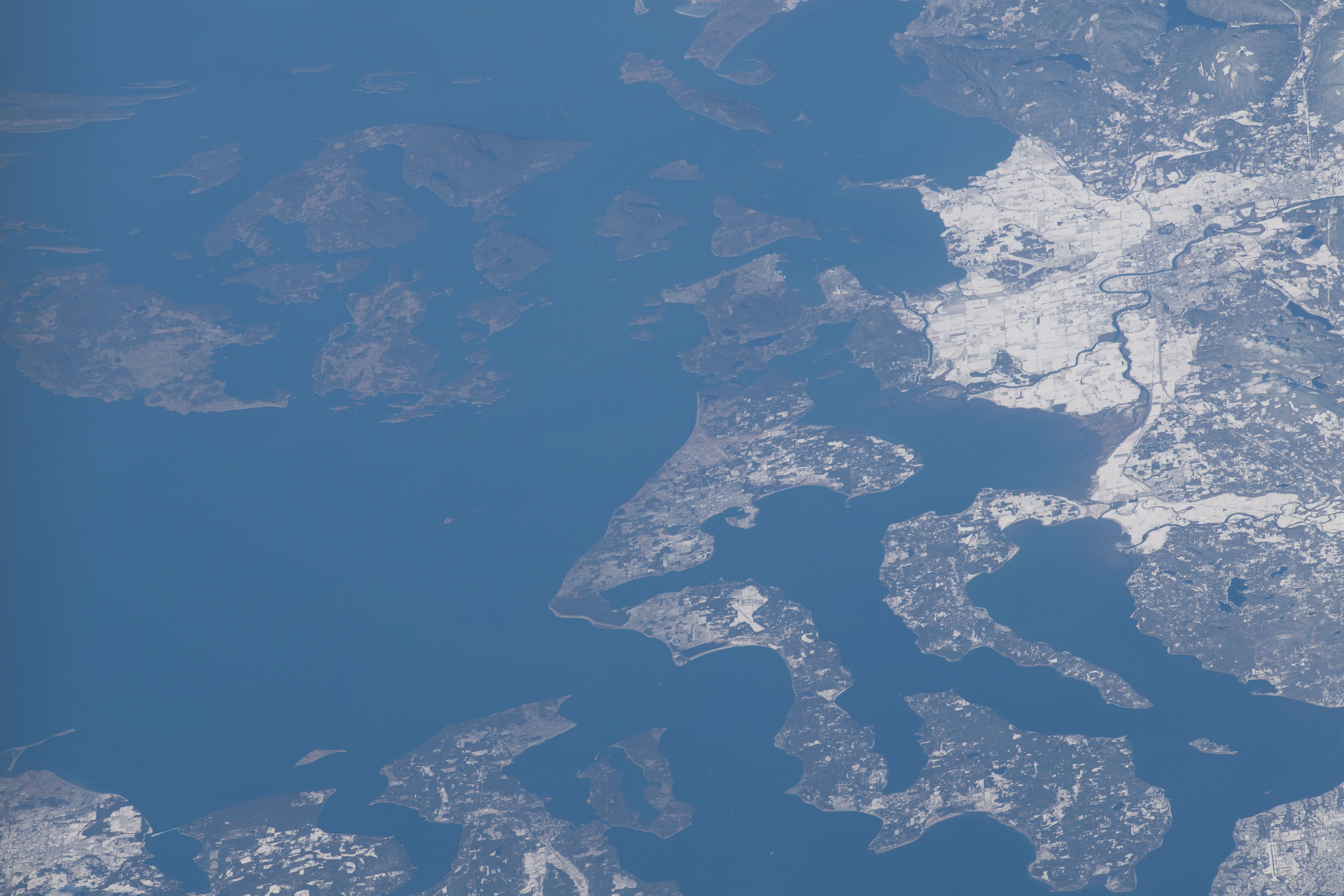
- Satellite image of Whidbey Island

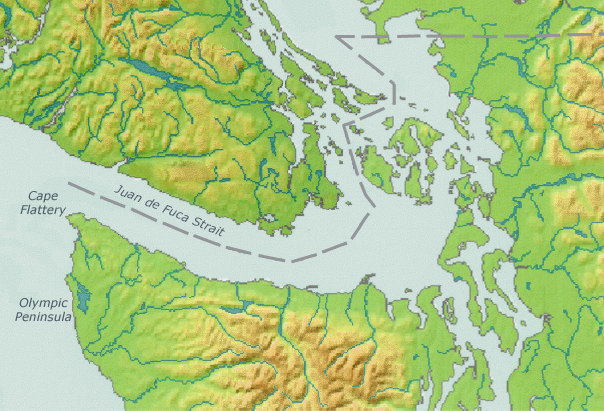
- Location within Strait of Juan de Fuca Location within Washington (state)
- Etymology: Joseph Whidbey

Geography
- Location: Puget Sound
- Coordinates: 48.1713°N 122.6092°W
- Area: 168.67 sq mi (436.9 km^{2})
- Length: 37 mi (60 km)
- Width: 10 mi (20 km)
- Highest elevation: 484 ft (147.5 m)
- Highest point: Goose Rock

Administration
- United States
- State: Washington
- County: Island County
- Largest settlement: Oak Harbor (pop. 24,622 as of 2020)

Demographics
- Demonym: Whidbey Islander
- Population: 69,501 (2020 census)
- Pop. density: 159.03/km^{2} (411.89/sq mi)

Additional information
- Official website: whidbeycamanoislands.com

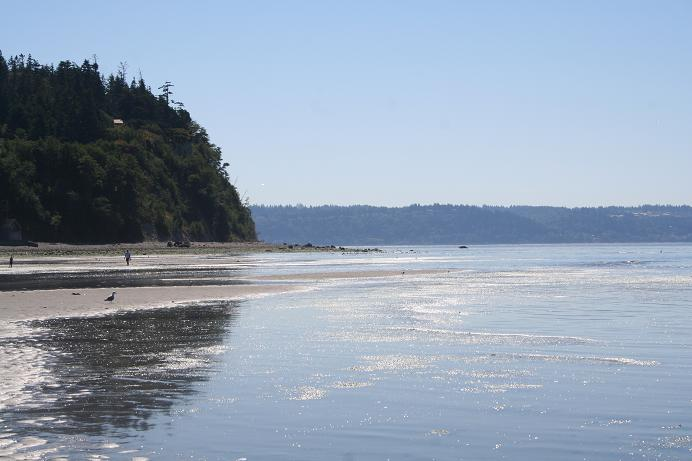
Cultus Bay at Low Tide

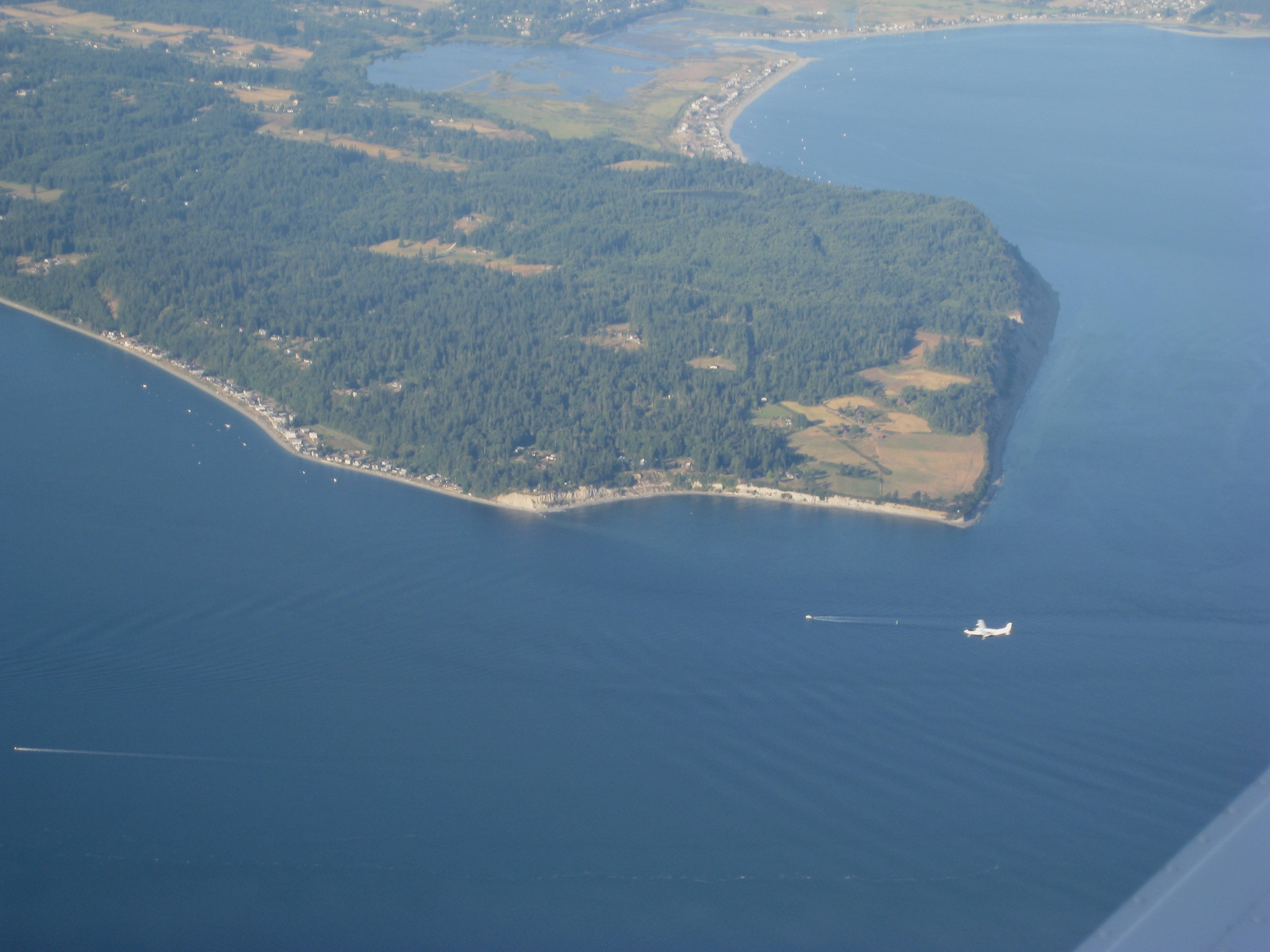
Double Bluff, with Useless Bay to the South (right) and Mutiny Bay to the North (left)

Whidbey Island (historical spellings Whidby, Whitbey, or Whitby) is the largest of the islands comprising Island County, Washington, in the United States, and the largest island in Washington state. Whidbey is about 30 miles (48 km) north of Seattle, and is separated from the Olympic Peninsula in the southwest by Admiralty Inlet. The island forms the northern boundary of Puget Sound. It is home to Naval Air Station Whidbey Island. The state parks and natural forests are home to numerous old growth trees.

As of the 2020 U.S. census, Whidbey Island has 69,501 total residents. The majority live in the center of the island, which includes its most populous city, Oak Harbor.

Whidbey Island is approximately 37 miles (60 km) from north to south, and 1.5 to 10 miles (2.4 to 16.1 km) wide, with a total land area of 168.67 square miles (436.9 km^{2}), making it the 40th largest island in the United States. It is ranked as the fourth longest and fourth largest island in the contiguous United States, behind Long Island, New York; Padre Island, Texas (the world's longest barrier island); and Isle Royale, Michigan. In the state of Washington, it is the largest island, followed by Orcas Island.

== History ==
=== Prehistory ===
Whidbey Island was originally the site of villages belonging to the Lower Skagit and Snohomish peoples. One name for the island that was recorded in the 19th century is "tscha-kole-chy," transliterated as čaʔkʷulči in one Lushootseed language translation. (Note: Kellogg cites the 19th century work of early Coupeville settler Flora Engle and a prominent Skagit man called Snakelum Charlie in compiling several Indigenous names relating to Whidbey Island, including "tscha-kole-chy.") (Note: SWSD provides a contemporary Lushootseed transliteration of the name "tscha-kole-chy.")

=== European contact ===
The first known European sighting of Whidbey Island was during the 1790 Spanish expedition of Manuel Quimper and Gonzalo López de Haro on the Princesa Real.

Captain George Vancouver fully explored the island in 1792. In May of that year, Royal Navy officers and members of Vancouver's expedition, Joseph Whidbey (master of HMS Discovery) and Peter Puget (a lieutenant on the ship), began to map and explore the areas of what would later be named Puget Sound. After Whidbey circumnavigated the island in June 1792, Vancouver named the island in his honor. By that time, Vancouver had claimed the area for Britain. On 4 June 1792, the King's Birthday, near Possession Point at the southern end of Whidbey Island, Vancouver took formal possession of all the coast and hinterland contiguous to the Strait of Juan de Fuca, including Puget Sound, under the name of New Georgia.

The first known overnight stay by a non-Native American was made on May 26, 1840, by a Catholic missionary, Father François Norbert Blanchet, during travel across Puget Sound. He had been invited by Chief Tslalakum. Blanchet remained on the island for nearly a year and guided the inhabitants in building a new log church.

Lieutenant Charles Wilkes, commander of the United States Exploring Expedition of 1838–1842, sailed the USS Vincennes into Penn Cove in 1841. By that time, the log church was already being built by the Native Americans beside a huge wooden cross (24 feet long) that they had erected. Wilkes ordered his men to use no force except in self-defense when dealing with the "savage and treacherous inhabitants". In fact, he encountered few problems with the indigenous people who had already been poorly treated by visitors and suffered from diseases they had introduced.

Wilkes named the lower cove Holmes Harbor, after his assistant surgeon, Silas Holmes. During this time he charted Puget Sound. Other sites in the area that were given names by Wilkes included Maury Island (Vashon), Hammersley Inlet, Totten and Budd Inlets, Agate Passage between the Kitsap Peninsula and Bainbridge Island, Hale Passage and Dana Passage.

The Oregon Treaty of 1846 established the boundary between Britain and the U.S.A. making Puget Sound and islands claimed by the United States.

Thomas W. Glasgow filed the first land claim on Whidbey Island in 1848, attempting to become the first settler. He built a small cabin near Penn Cove, planted some crops and married a local lady, Julia Pat-Ke-Nim. Glasgow left in August of that year however, having been forced out by the local inhabitants. Colonel Isaac N. Ebey arrived from Columbus, Ohio, in 1850 and became the first permanent white settler, claiming a square mile (2.6 km^{2}) of prairie with a southern shoreline on Admiralty Inlet. He took advantage of the 640 acres offered free of charge to each married couple, the first to do so, on October 15, 1850. In the fall of 1851, his children, his wife, three of her brothers and the Samuel Crockett family arrived to join Ebey. In addition to farming potatoes and wheat, Ebey was also the postmaster for Port Townsend, Washington and rowed a boat daily across the inlet in order to work at the post office there. Colonel Ebey also served as a representative in the Oregon Territory Legislative Assembly, as Island County's first Justice of the Peace, as a probate judge and as Collector of Customs for the Puget Sound District.

On August 11, 1857, at age 39, Colonel Ebey was murdered and beheaded by Native Americans, said to be Haida who had traveled to this area from Haida Gwaii. Some sources however, refer to his killers as "Russian Indians called Kakes or Kikans, [from] Kufrinoff Island, near the head of Prince Frederick's Sound." Ebey was slain in proxy-retaliation for the killing of a Haida chief or Tyee and 27 other indigenous people at Port Gamble. Fort Ebey, named for the Colonel, was established in 1942 on the west side of the central part of the island, just northwest of Coupeville.

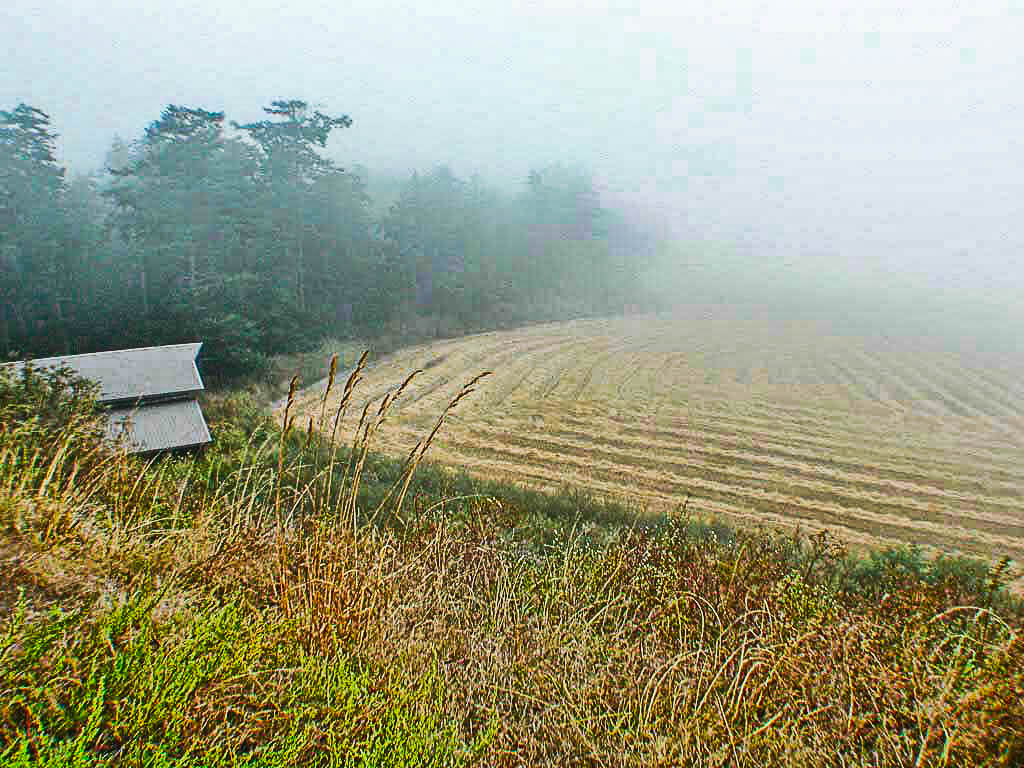
On the Bluff Trail in Ebey's Landing National Historical Reserve

Admiralty Head Lighthouse is located in this area, on the grounds of Fort Casey State Park. The area around Coupeville is the federally protected Ebey's Landing National Historical Reserve, named in honor of Isaac Ebey.

On September 25, 1959, a U.S. Navy P5M antisubmarine aircraft with an unarmed (it carried no nuclear material at the time) nuclear depth charge on board crash-landed into Puget Sound near Whidbey Island. The Mark 90 nuclear bomb casing was never recovered.

On August 8, 1970, the infamous Penn Cove capture of several orcas along with the deaths of several orcas occurred in Penn Cove off the island's east coast.

In December 1984, the island was the site of a violent encounter between law enforcement and white nationalist and organized crime leader Robert Jay Mathews of the group The Order. A large shootout occurred between Mathews and FBI agents in which Mathews was killed during a house fire. Mathews' followers have since gathered on the island at the location where he was killed by FBI agents on the anniversary of his death to commemorate it.

On June 10, 2022, the island dedicated one of its trash cans to late night talk show host Conan O'Brien in an elaborate ceremony in which O'Brien signed the top of the trash can with a black marker. O'Brien was visiting the island to attend the premiere of a play written by Liza O'Brien (his wife).

== Government ==
Whidbey Island, along with Camano Island, Ben Ure Island and six uninhabited islands, comprises Island County, Washington. The county seat is located in the town of Coupeville on Whidbey Island.

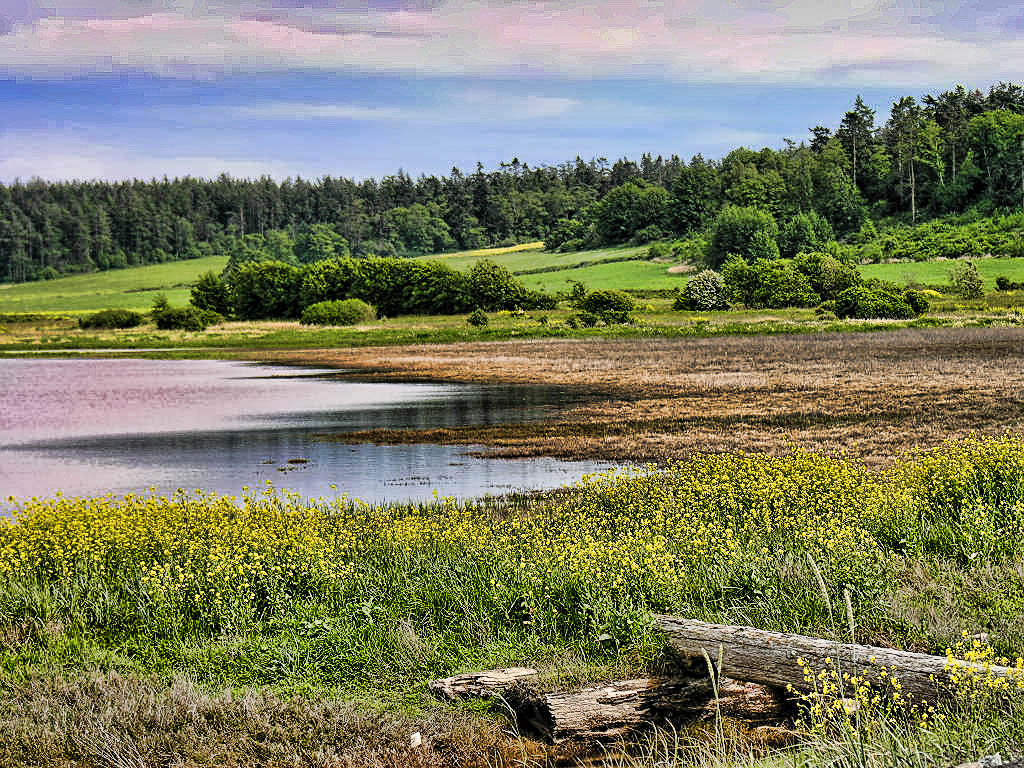
Looking east over Swantown Lake

Population centers of Whidbey Island include the City of Oak Harbor, the Town of Coupeville, the City of Langley, the Village of Freeland, the Community of Greenbank, the Village of Clinton and the Community of Bayview. Only Oak Harbor, Coupeville and Langley are incorporated, the others (with the exception of Greenbank and Bayview) are all census-designated places, and all but Bayview have their own post offices and ZIP codes.

== Economy ==
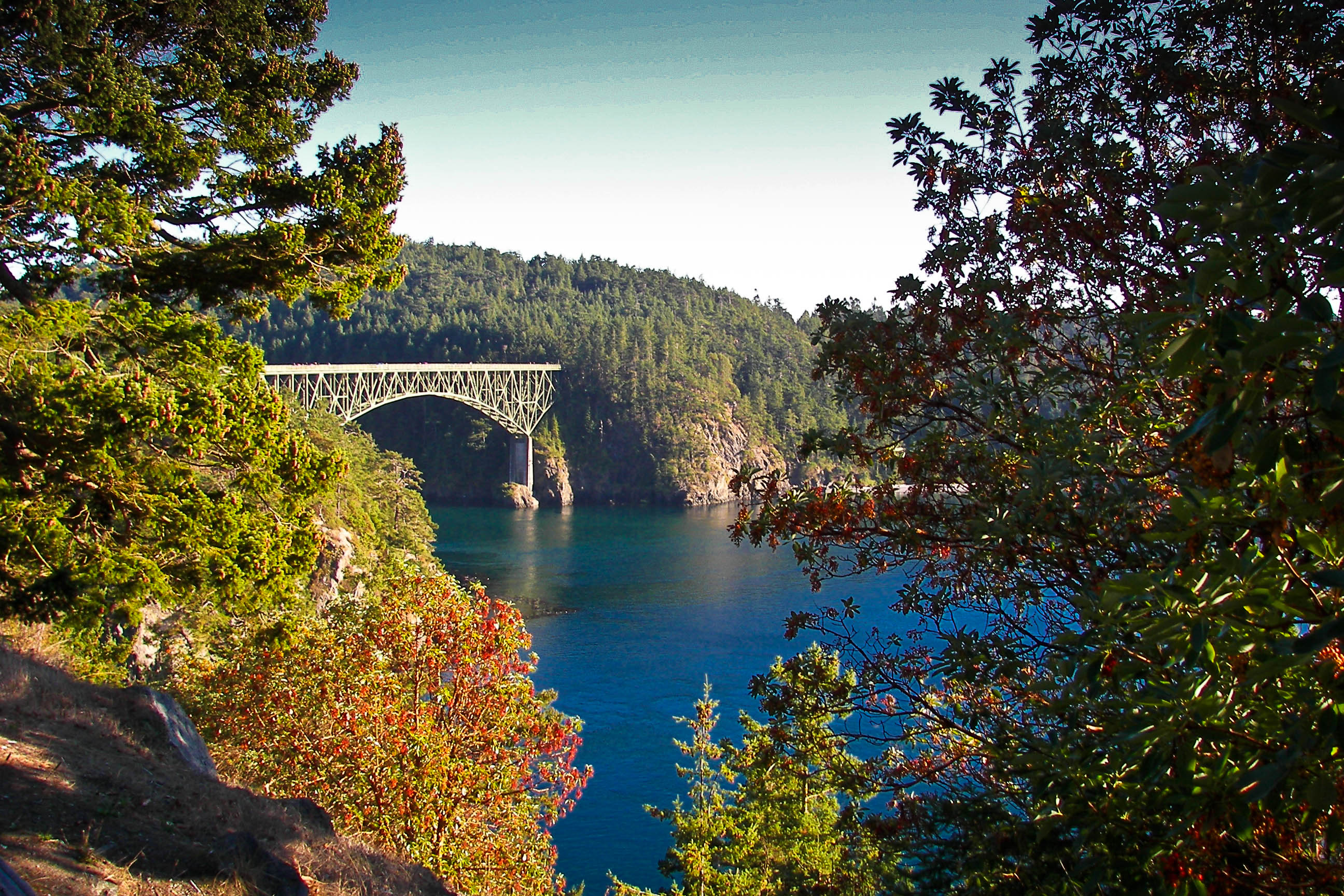
Deception Pass Bridge

Carved sign welcoming visitors as they arrive by ferry at Clinton

Whidbey Island is divided economically into two different regions: the northern end of the island (encompassing Oak Harbor and Whidbey Island Naval Air Station), and the remainder of the island (encompassing Coupeville, Greenbank, Freeland, Langley, Clinton and the smaller communities in-between).

The economy of the northern end of Whidbey Island is strongly influenced by the presence of Whidbey Island Naval Air Station near Oak Harbor (N.A.S. Whidbey). N.A.S. Whidbey is Oak Harbor's largest employer; thus, Oak Harbor has a predominantly service-based economy and several national chain stores have been attracted to the Oak Harbor area.

The economy of Whidbey Island south of Oak Harbor relies heavily on tourism, small-scale agriculture, and the arts.

Tourism is especially important for both Whidbey and Camano Islands. On Whidbey, tourists find a wide range of amenities in the towns of Oak Harbor, Coupeville, Freeland and Langley. Coupeville's Penn Cove Mussel Farm exports large quantities of its highly renowned Penn Cove Mussels. This aquaculture facility, along with a number of small farms, reflects the rural agricultural nature of most of central Whidbey Island. Many of these small farms host farm stands onsite, where customers may buy produce, flowers, meat, eggs and other locally raised products directly from the farmers.

Whidbey is home to numerous working artists, writers, and performers. These include many well-known painters, sculptors, glass artists, wood workers, metal workers, mixed media artists, photographers, authors, poets, actors, and musicians.

In addition to being a haven for artists, the southern end of Whidbey Island also serves as a minor bedroom community for the nearby cities of Everett, where the Boeing Everett Factory is located, and Seattle. Commuters to and from those areas use the Washington State Ferries system's run between Clinton and Mukilteo.

== Geography ==
Whidbey Island is often claimed to be the longest island in the continental United States (or another similar claim), but according to the Seattle Times it cannot be correctly considered so. The island has several bays, including on its east side Oak Harbor with the town of Oak Harbor at its base, and Penn Cove with the towns of Coupeville and San de Fuca on its south and north shores respectively.

Whidbey Island has four lakes that are part of its interior hydrology: Cranberry Lake (inside Deception Pass State Park), Deer Lake, Goss Lake and Lone Lake (both near the town of Langley).

== Demographics ==
=== 2020 census ===
As of the 2020 census, there were 69,501 people and 28,461 households living within the three census county divisions (CCDs) that encompass Whidbey Island. Of them, the North Whidbey CCD is the most populous with 40,814 residents, followed by the South Whidbey CCD at 15,082 residents and the Central Whidbey CCD at 13,605 residents. The island's population density was 412.1 inhabitants per square mile (159.1/km^{2}). There were 32,926 total housing units, of which 84.2% were occupied and 15.8% were vacant or for occasional use. The racial makeup of Whidbey Island was 75.9% White, 3.3% Black or African American, 0.8% Native American and Alaska Native, 5.3% Asian, 0.6% Native Hawaiian and Pacific Islander, and 3.1% from other races. Residents who identified as more than one race were 11.0% of the population. Hispanic or Latino residents of any race were 9.2% of the population.

== Parks and reserve areas ==
Whidbey Island contains several state and federal parks and recreation areas. The largest site is Ebey's Landing National Historical Reserve, created in 1978 as the first national historic reserve in the United States and maintained by the National Park Service to preserve the rural history and culture of the island and to protect the area's rare and sensitive plants.

Washington State Parks located on the island include Deception Pass State Park (the most visited state park in Washington), Joseph Whidbey State Park, Fort Ebey State Park, Fort Casey State Park, Possession Point State Park, and South Whidbey State Park. There is also a series of county operated parks throughout the Island including:

- Saratoga Woods, an 120-acre park on the south end of the island that has equestrian, biking and hiking trails. Its also features include an abandoned air field and a glacier erratic.
- Double Bluff County Park, a 3/4-acre park with beach access, a picnic area, and an off-leash dog park.

Earth Sanctuary is a nature reserve, sculpture garden and retreat center on Whidbey Island. The ponds and bog fen complex have been designated as a "habitat of local importance" by the Whidbey Audubon Society and Island County Critical Areas program.

The Price Sculpture Forest opened in October 2020 in Coupeville.

== Festivals ==
Whidbey Island hosts many festivals and celebrations throughout the year.

- Whidbey Island Area Fair ("Island County Fair" until 2012), on the third weekend of July, includes rides, food, and animal shows.
- Wag'n'Walk, which takes place towards the end of August, is Western Washington's premier celebration of dogs and things dog-related. It includes vendors, games, competition, demonstrations and the Wag'n'Walk itself.
- Whidbey Island Kite Festival, in September and includes children's kitemaking lessons, a sportkite competition, and sportkite lessons.
- Langley's Mystery Weekend in March or February. For the weekend the Town of Langley turns into the setting of a fictional murder mystery.
- Penn Cove Mussel Festival, in March, celebrates the bounty of the sea, especially the mussel.
- Island Shakespeare Festival, July through September.
- Loganberry Festival at the Greenbank Farm in July (This was discontinued after the 2014 festival.)
- Maxwelton Beach Fourth of July Parade and fireworks show, which takes place at the southern end of Maxwelton Road at Dave Mackie Park. After the parade, there are events for all ages, including three-legged races, divided into age groups, and the most popular event, the egg toss.
- Choochokam was an annual street fair and arts festival, started in 1975, held in downtown Langley during the second weekend of July. The last Choochokam was held in 2016.
- Tour de Whidbey, in September, is an organized bike ride with varying routes around Whidbey Island.
- The Whidbey Island Marathon and Half Marathon, in April since 2002.
- Whidbey Island Race Week: a week-long sailing regatta every summer based out of Oak Harbor with daily racing in Penn Cove and/or Saratoga Passage (depending on wind conditions). Usually held third week of July, varies slightly due to tidal conditions. Last held in 2019.)
- Whidbey Summer Classic Regatta: a replacement for Whidbey Island Race Week, a three day sailing regatta held in Penn Cove and/or Saratoga Passage in July.
- Whidbey Island Highland Games – 2nd Saturday in August. Competitions in Scottish Heavy Athletics, Highland Dancing, Pipe and drum bands.
- Oak Harbor Music Festival – An annual music festival held in the biggest city on the island, Oak Harbor. It is held over Labor Day Weekend, and consists of a wide variety of musical acts.
- DjangoFestNW – An annual 5-day music festival held in mid-September that celebrates the music of Django Reinhardt at Whidbey Island Center for the Arts.

== Climate ==
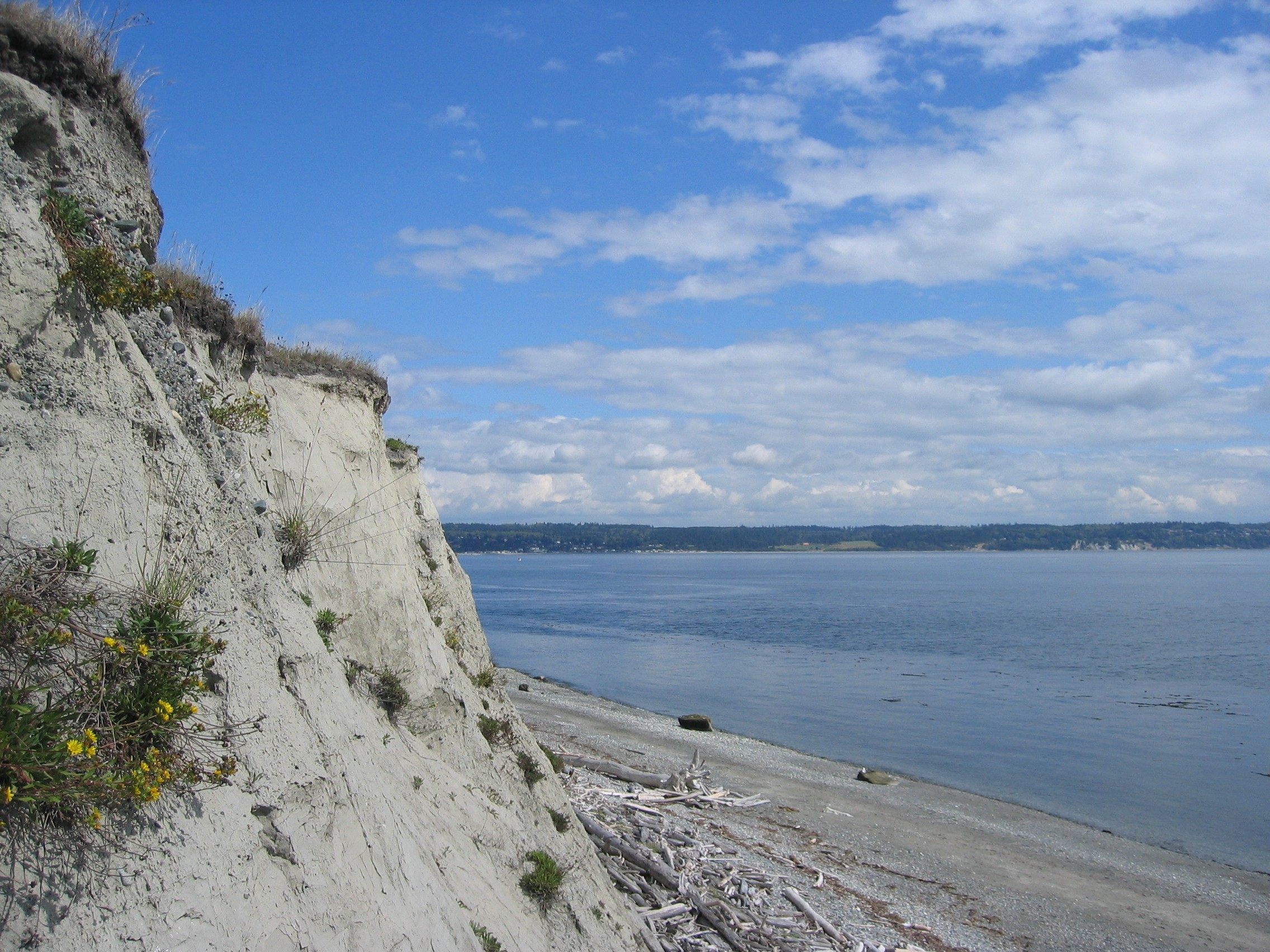
A cliff on Whidbey Island near Fort Casey

Whidbey Island lies partially in the rain shadow of the Olympic Mountain Range to the west, and has a variety of climate zones. This can be observed by rainfall amounts – wettest in the south with average rainfall of 36 inches (910 mm), driest in the central district of Coupeville with average rainfall of 20 to 22 inches (510 to 560 mm), and turning moister again farther north with average rainfall of 32 inches (810 mm). Microclimates abound, determined by proximity to water, elevation and prevailing winds.

Climate data for Whidbey Island NAS (1981−2010 normals)
Month	Jan	Feb	Mar	Apr	May	Jun	Jul	Aug	Sep	Oct	Nov	Dec	Year
Mean daily maximum °F (°C)	46.8 (8.2)	48.9 (9.4)	52.2 (11.2)	55.6 (13.1)	59.5 (15.3)	63.6 (17.6)	66.5 (19.2)	67.3 (19.6)	64.0 (17.8)	57.2 (14.0)	50.3 (10.2)	45.5 (7.5)	56.5 (13.6)
Mean daily minimum °F (°C)	36.2 (2.3)	35.4 (1.9)	38.4 (3.6)	41.5 (5.3)	46.1 (7.8)	50.0 (10.0)	52.1 (11.2)	51.8 (11.0)	48.0 (8.9)	43.2 (6.2)	39.2 (4.0)	35.1 (1.7)	43.1 (6.2)
Average precipitation inches (mm)	2.23 (57)	1.47 (37)	1.67 (42)	1.65 (42)	1.56 (40)	1.28 (33)	0.74 (19)	0.96 (24)	1.15 (29)	2.07 (53)	3.40 (86)	2.11 (54)	20.29 (515)
Average snowfall inches (cm)	0.9 (2.3)	1.5 (3.8)	0.1 (0.25)	0.1 (0.25)	0.0 (0.0)	0.0 (0.0)	0.0 (0.0)	0.0 (0.0)	0.0 (0.0)	0.0 (0.0)	0.9 (2.3)	1.7 (4.3)	5.2 (13)
Average precipitation days (≥ 0.01 in)	16.4	10.7	11.5	11.9	10.0	5.9	3.7	3.8	4.1	12.6	20.7	17.3	144.7
Average snowy days (≥ 0.1 in)	1.0	0.5	0.1	0.0	0.0	0.0	0.0	0.0	0.0	0.0	0.4	0.9	2.9
Source: NOAA

== Ecology ==
=== Ancient extinct fauna ===
During the Last Glacial Period, the Salish Sea region was populated by American mastodon, Columbian mammoth, Bison antiquus, giant ground sloth, saber-toothed salmon, Camelops (camels), and other animals. There is evidence in the shorelines of the island of mammoth hunts by Indigenous peoples extending beyond the formation of the major coastlines. The Island County Historical Museum currently possesses mammoth tusks which were unearthed by soil erosion.

=== Flora ===
Vegetation varies greatly from one end of the island to the other. Vegetation in the south is more similar to that of mainland Washington. The principal trees are Douglas fir, red alder, bigleaf maple, western red cedar, western hemlock, and Pacific madrone. Compared to the rest of western Washington state, vine maple is notably absent, except where they have been planted. Other under-story plants include the evergreen huckleberry, lower longleaf Oregon grape, elderberry, salal, oceanspray, and varieties of nettle. Non-native introduced plants such as foxglove, ivy and holly are also evident.

Farther up the island, however, the shorter Oregon-Grape and the blue Evergreen Huckleberry is seen less, while tall Oregon-grape and Red Huckleberry predominate. The native Pacific rhododendron is much more visible. Amongst the deciduous varieties, Garry oak (from which Oak Harbor takes its name) are seen more frequently in the northern portion of the island. In the conifer classification, grand fir is found more in the northern part of Whidbey Island along with Sitka spruce and shore pine. There are three open prairie areas on Whidbey Island – Smith Prairie, Crockett Prairie and Ebey Prairie. Some patches of prickly pear cactus are found along the slopes near Partridge Point.

=== Fauna ===
Gray whales migrate between Whidbey and Camano Islands during March and April and can be seen from both ship and shore. Orca also make use of the waters surrounding Whidbey Island, including the southern residents. Penn Cove was used as an orca-hunting area in the 1960s and 1970s by aquarium owner Ted Griffin, who captured several young southern resident orcas for sale to marine parks and killed others in the process. The southern residents did not return to Penn Cove until a sighting in 2024.

Clams and oysters are abundant locally and may be harvested from some public beaches. The Washington State Department of Health provides an online guide to assist in identifying shellfish varieties as well as providing guidance about where to find specific varieties.

According to the Whidbey Audubon Society, Approximately 230 bird species are reported to take advantage of the diverse habitats on the island.

== Education ==
=== Public school districts ===
Whidbey Island is served by three public school districts.

Oak Harbor School District operates in Oak Harbor. Within the district, there is one high school, one alternative high school, two middle schools, and five elementary schools. Within the Washington Interscholastic Activities Association, Oak Harbor High is listed as a 3-A school.

Coupeville School District operates in Coupeville, Washington, and Greenbank, Washington. Within the district, there is one high school, one middle school, and one elementary school. Within the Washington Interscholastic Activities Association, Coupeville High is listed as a 1-A school.

South Whidbey School District serves the southern end of the island, including Freeland, Langley, and Clinton. Within the district, there is one high school (grades 9–12), one alternative school (grades K–12), one middle school (grades 5–8) split between two campuses, and one elementary school (grades K–4). Within the Washington Interscholastic Activities Association, South Whidbey High is listed as a 1-A school.

=== Colleges ===
Skagit Valley College has one campus located in Oak Harbor.

Seattle Pacific University owns Camp Casey, a retreat center near Coupeville, which was once the barracks for the adjacent Fort Casey.

== Notable people ==
- Jeff Alexander, conductor and arranger. Lived on the island at the end of his life.
- Shayla Beesley, actress, grew up in Oak Harbor
- Bruce Bochte, American baseball player. Bochte lived on Whidbey Island for over three years after his baseball playing days were over.
- Aleah Chapin, painter, grew up on Whidbey Island
- Drew Christie, animator and filmmaker
- Lana Condor, known for her role in To All The Boys I've Loved Before
- Pete Dexter, writer
- Elizabeth George, author
- Anne Gittinger, majority shareholder of Nordstrom
- Grant Heiken, geologist and author retired to the island
- Nancy Horan, author
- Marti Malloy, Judo practitioner and Olympian
- Robert Jay Mathews, American neo-Nazi terrorist and leader of The Order (white supremacist group), an American white supremacist militant group, died on Whidbey Island during a shoot-out with federal law enforcement agents
- Jack Metcalf, member of the United States House of Representatives
- Patty Murray, United States Senator, lives on Whidbey Island
- Buell Neidlinger, jazz musician
- David Ossman, founder of Firesign Theater
- Aaron Parks, jazz pianist
- Frank Robinson, founder of the Robinson Helicopter Company
- Mark Sargent, conspiracy theorist
- Paul Schell, former Mayor of Seattle (founder of the Inn at Langley)
- Carl Weathers, actor and NFL player
- David Whyte, poet
- Juliet Winters Carpenter, translator of Japanese literature and author

== Infrastructure ==
=== Transportation ===
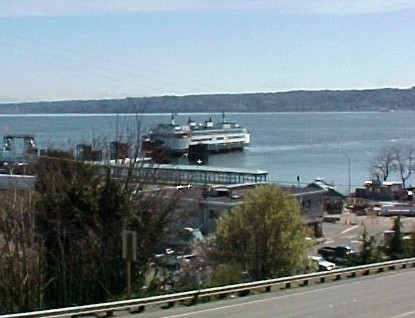
Ferry at Clinton

The only bridge that reaches Whidbey Island is the Deception Pass Bridge, State Route 20, which connects the north end of Whidbey to the mainland via Fidalgo Island. Prior to the completion of the bridge in 1935, Whidbey Island was linked to Fidalgo Island by the Deception Pass ferry, which ran from 1924 to 1935. Modern ferry service is available via State Route 20 on the Coupeville to Port Townsend ferry, and via State Route 525 on the Clinton to Mukilteo ferry service on the southern east coast.

Travel on the island involves use of an extensive county road system, or city infrastructure depending on location, all of which act as feeders to the two state highways State Route 525 and State Route 20.

Whidbey Island's State Routes 525/20 is the only nationally designated Scenic Byway on an island. It is named the "Whidbey Island Scenic Isle Way". It is also a part of the Cascade Loop.

Public transportation is provided by Island Transit, zero-fare bus service paid for by a 6/10th of 1% sales tax within the county. There are currently 11 bus routes serving Whidbey Island. The service operated 7 days a week, except for major holidays.

Two public airports provide service to Whidbey Island. Whidbey Air Park is located 2 miles (3.2 km) southwest of Langley with a 2,470 feet (750 m) long runway. A.J. Eisenberg Airport is located 3 miles (4.8 km) southwest of Oak Harbor with a 3,265 ft (995 m) long runway. Kenmore Air Express ran a scheduled airline service to Whidbey Island serving the Oak Harbor airport from 2006 to 2009.

The United States Navy operates two airports on Whidbey Island. The largest is a two-runway airport located at Whidbey Island Naval Air Station north of Oak Harbor. In addition, the Navy also operates a flight training facility named Naval Outlying Landing Field Coupeville (Coupeville OLF) located just southeast of Coupeville. The Navy named USS Whidbey Island (LSD-41) in honor of the island.

=== Health systems ===
Whidbey Health is the regional, county-run healthcare system with a general hospital in Coupeville. It also operates walk-in clinics in Clinton and Oak Harbor, along with four primary care facilities.

NAS Whidbey has a limited service hospital at the main base at Ault Field. The Veterans Health Administration also operates a clinic in Oak Harbor to supplement its larger facilities on the mainland.

== Communities ==
North to south:

- Deception Pass
- Oak Harbor – Largest city
- West Beach
- San De Fuca
- Coupeville – County Seat
- Keystone
- Admiral's Cove
- Lagoon Point
- Greenbank
- Baby Island Heights
- Langley
- Freeland
- Bayview
- Clinton
- Maxwelton
- Glendale

== See also ==
- Admiralty Head Lighthouse
- Meerkerk Rhododendron Gardens
- Price Sculpture Forest
