= Clinton, Washington =

- CDP
- Location of Clinton, Washington
- Coordinates: 47°58′26″N 122°20′49″W
- Country: United States
- State: Washington
- County: Island

Area
  - Total: 3.7 sq mi (9.5 km^{2})
  - Land: 0.97 sq mi (2.5 km^{2})
  - Water: 2.7 sq mi (7.0 km^{2})
- Elevation: 0 ft (0 m)

Population (2020)
  - Total: 956
  - Density: 990/sq mi (380/km^{2})
- Demonym: Clintonian
- Time zone: UTC-8 (Pacific (PST))
  - Summer (DST): UTC-7 (PDT)
- ZIP Code: 98236
- Area code(s): 360, 564
- Telephone exchanges: 341, 579
- FIPS code: 53-13155
- GNIS feature ID: 2407635

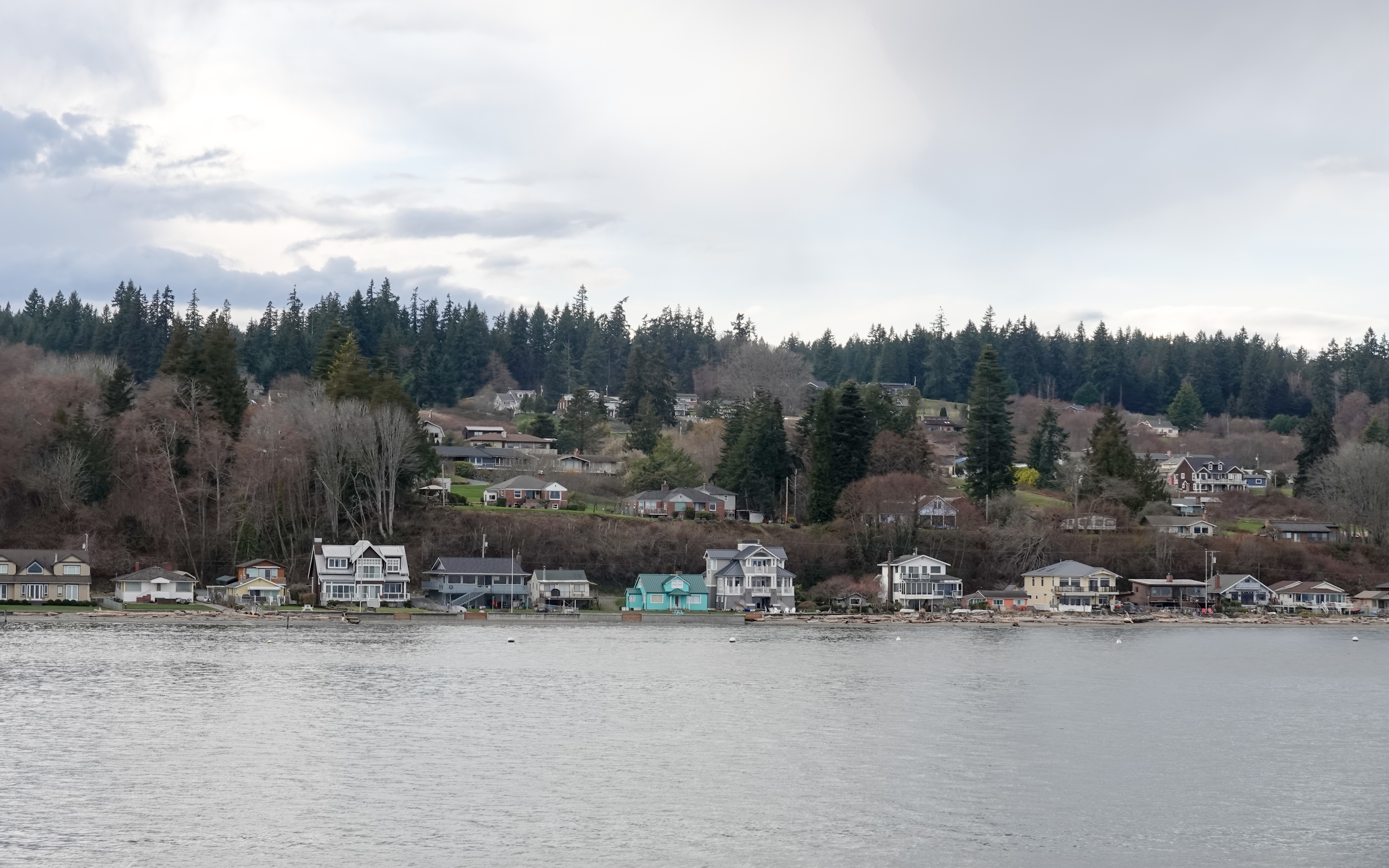
Clinton shore front

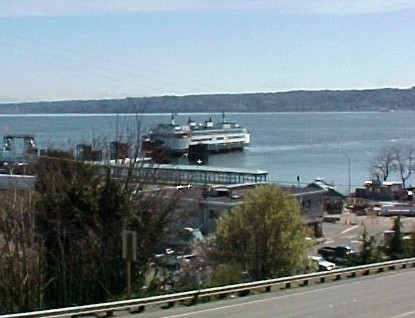
Ferry at Clinton

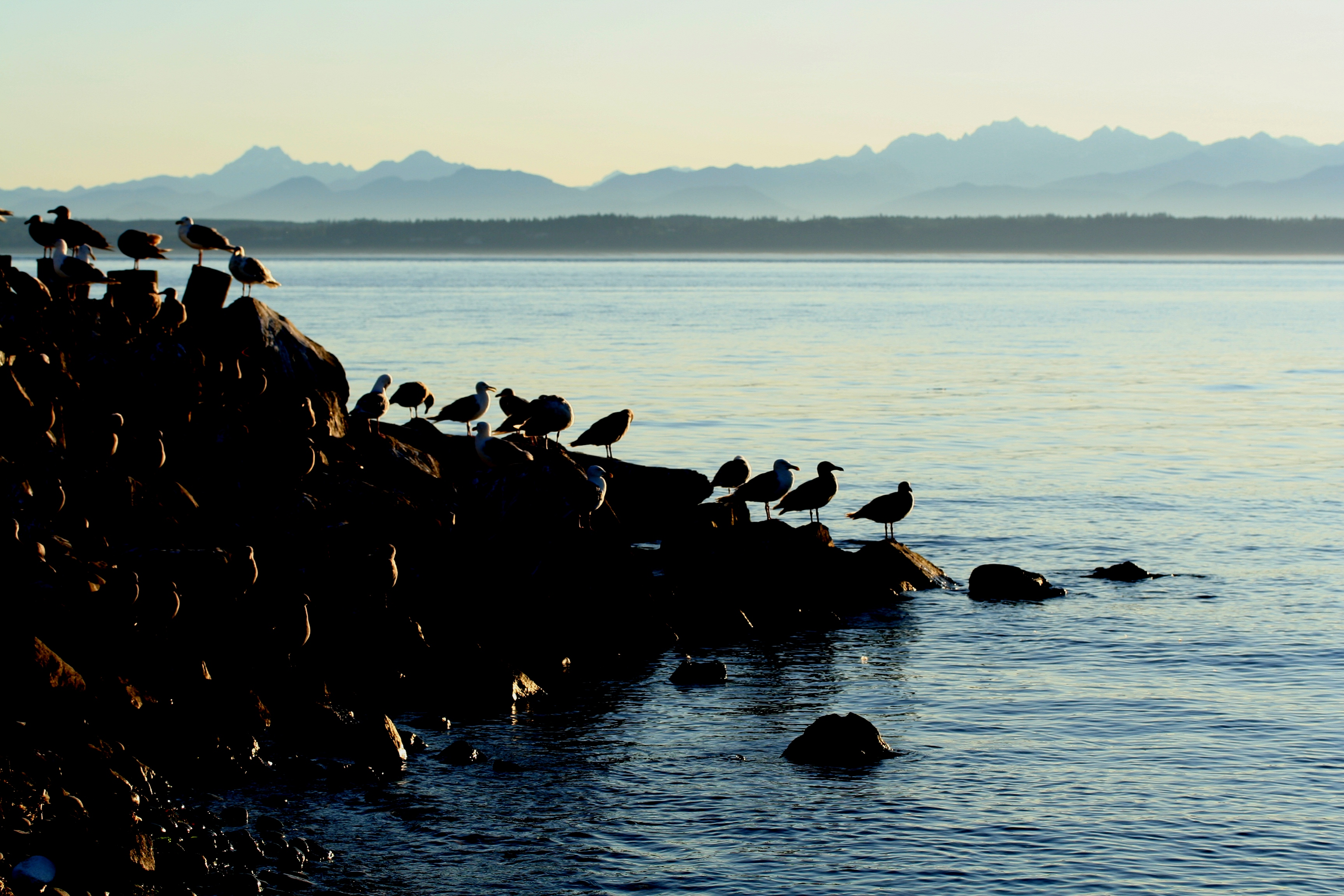
Gulls at Cultus Bay

Clinton is a community and census-designated place (CDP) located on southern Whidbey Island in Island County, Washington, United States. As of the 2020 census, the population was 956. The local post office, however, serves approximately 2,500 people in surrounding areas.

Clinton is the western terminus of the Mukilteo–Clinton ferry operated by Washington State Ferries, which serves Whidbey Island. The ferry carries State Route 525, which continues through Clinton to the rest of Whidbey Island. Much of Clinton is situated on a high bluff overlooking Saratoga Passage on Puget Sound. The community of Columbia Beach, however, rests at sea level. To the north of the ferry dock is old Clinton, where the community started.

== History ==
Whidbey Island was originally inhabited by Coast Salish tribes, including the Suquamish, Swinomish, Lower Skagit, and Snohomish. Clinton, was primarily inhabited by the Snohomish tribe. There were three main Snohomish villages in southern Whidbey: D’GWAD’wk (Digwadsh), TSEHT-skluhks, and SHET’LH-shet-lhuts. The Digwadsh, meaning "in the basket", was the largest of these villages. It had about seven longhouses and frequently welcomed visits from neighboring tribes like the Duwamish and Suquamish. Today, many descendants of the Digwadsh live on the Tulalip Reservation.

The local tribes built cedar-plank longhouses and lived off the island's natural resources, including berries, fish, and other local bounty. European contact began in the late 18th century with the arrival of explorer George Vancouver. By the late 1800s, more settlers began to move to Whidbey Island, bringing diseases that decimated many Native populations. In northern Whidbey, Colonel Isaac N. Ebey became the island's first permanent white resident.

Clinton was initially known as Brighton Beach but was later renamed Clinton, possibly after the Clinton family, some of the area's earliest settlers. By the late 1800s, Clinton developed a reputation for its milling and logging industries. The early town centers included the old Clinton Union Store, the Post Office, and the Salisbury Shingle Mill.

Mukilteo–Clinton ferry service began in 1911 as a passenger ferry and transitioned to a car ferry by 1919, significantly improving access to South Whidbey Island. Before that, traveling to Whidbey Island by road, via the Deception Pass Bridge, could take over an hour. Boats were also essential for delivering mail and supplies to the island. The ferry service initially operated under the Black Ball Line of the Puget Sound Navigation Company and was later acquired by the Washington State Department of Transportation, creating Washington State Ferries (WSF), now the largest ferry system in the U.S.

== Geography ==
According to the United States Census Bureau, the CDP has a total area of 3.7 square miles (9.6 km^{2}), of which, 1.0 square mile (2.6 km^{2}) of it is land and 2.7 square miles (7.0 km^{2}) of it (73.84%) is water. The community's coastline and bluff terrain offer panoramic views.

== Economy ==
The economy of Clinton, along with the surrounding Island County, is driven by a combination of tourism, service industries, agriculture, and small-scale manufacturing. Outdoor activities, such as boating, hiking, and beach activities, draw visitors to the area.

== Demographics ==
Historical population
Census	Pop.	Note	%±
U.S. Decennial Census; 1970 1980 1990; 2000 2010

As of the 2020 census, Clinton had a population of 956 people and 507 total households. The average age in the community was 49.5 years old, with 32.4 percent of residents over the age of 65. The racial makeup of Clinton was 86.0% non-Hispanic white, 0.05% Black, 0.09% Native American and Alaska native, 2.7% Asian, 0.01% Native Hawaiian and Pacific Islander, and 1.2% other. Multi-racial people made up 8.5% of the population. Hispanic or Latino of any race was 3% of the population.

According to estimates from the 2022 American Community Survey, approximately 57% of Clinton residents are U.S. citizens and 5.8% are foreign-born. The median household income stood at $69,570 in 2022. Approximately 13% of Clinton residents have an income below the poverty line. Clinton residents largely commuted by car, with an average commute time of 37.1 minutes.

== Education ==
The community is served by the South Whidbey School District.

The Sno-Isle Regional Library System has a library in Clinton, supported by the "Friends of the Clinton Library".

== Landmarks ==
There are two grocery stores in Clinton, one in the downtown area and another a few miles west.
