= Ebey =

Ebey may refer to:

== People ==
- Isaac N. Ebey (1818–1857), the first permanent white resident of Whidbey Island, Washington
- Margaret Louis Ebey (born 1935), known professionally as Margie Singleton, an American country music singer and songwriter

== Places ==
- Ebey Slough
- Ebey's Landing National Historical Reserve
- Ferry House (Ebey's Landing)
- Fort Ebey State Park in Island County, Washington is a camping park in the Washington State Park System

== See also ==
- eBay
