= Captain Whidbey Inn =

- U.S. Historic district – Contributing property
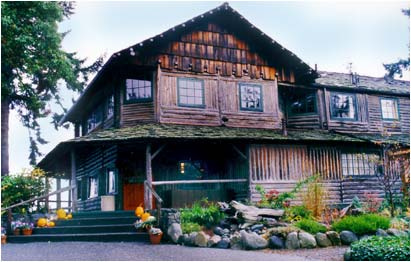

- Location within Washington (state)
- Location: On Whidbey Island near Coupeville, Washington
- Coordinates: 48°13.38′N 122°43.70′W
- Built: 1907
- Part of: Central Whidbey Island Historic District (ID73001869)

The Captain Whidbey Inn is a lodging and hospitality establishment built in 1907 located on Whidbey Island at the west end of Penn Cove just outside Coupeville, Washington. It is part of the National Register of Historic Places listed Central Whidbey Island Historic District.

== History ==
The Captain Whidbey Inn was built in the fall and winter of 1907 from Madrona logs and stone found on-site by Chris Fisher and his son Edward. The post and beam construction, with the log infill, sits intact as originally built. It was opened in May 1907 as part of a large recreation retreat then-called Still Park, with the inn given the short lived name of the “Whid-Isle Inn”. The inn and park were developed by Judge Lester Still. The park also had camping, cabins, horse trails, tennis courts and a warm salt water swimming pool. A collection of pictures from that period remain in a history collection at the inn, as well as in the Island County Historical Society’s collections.

The inn originally contained 15 sleeping rooms upstairs and a large gathering room downstairs with a two-sided fireplace. The fireplace was faced with native stone; it still forms the central meeting place for the inn, with one side facing the lobby sitting area and the other facing the restaurant. Daily steamers from both Seattle and Everett were the original links to the outside world bringing passengers, supplies and mail to the dock located at the eastward-facing front of the inn. Parts of the original dock and stone stairway can still be seen while walking the current pier. Automobile access was available via ferry before Deception Pass Bridge was completed in 1935; Judge Still is credited with bringing the first automobile to Whidbey Island. The vehicle can still be seen at the Island County Historical Society Museum. Over time, the Inn has served as a general store, a girls' school, and a post office. The property returned to offering accommodations open to the public in 1946.

== Present ==
Today, the main inn appears very similar to the way it was when it was built. The original wood floors are still visible in both the lobby and the bar. The large gathering room has become the dining room, kitchen, and Judge Still's Tavern. Over the years, electricity as well as Wi-Fi have been installed and upgraded throughout the building. The original inn now houses two suites and 10 regular rooms upstairs overlooking Penn cove and the gardens. The original cabins are now gone and have been replaced by four waterside cabins with private decks, views of Penn Cove and kitchens. The Lagoon Building houses 14 rooms that overlook the lagoon lawn and lagoon. Each of the 30 rooms has a unique style filled with rustic charm. Guests can arrive either by car or, during the summer, at the inns dock by boat or float plane.

In 2018, the Inn was bought by brothers Matt and Mike French, as well as their business partner Eric Cheong. After purchasing the Inn, they renovated the Lagoon Rooms, updated the decor in the main hotel, and opened an improved restaurant with a rotating menu.

== Bibliography ==
- Frommer's Washington State
- Access Seattle By Rachel Clements, Dena Dawson
- The Best Recipes from America's Food Festivals By James O. Fraioli
- Best Places Northwest: The Locals' Guide to the Best Restaurants, Lodgings ... By Giselle Smith
- Writers' and Artists' Hideouts: Great Getaways for Seducing the Muse By Andrea Brown
- Lynn, Holly, et al. Images of America: Coupeville. Charleston, SC: Arcadia Publishing, 2012. Print.
