= Sergeant Clark House =

Historic house in Washington, United States

- U.S. Historic district – Contributing property
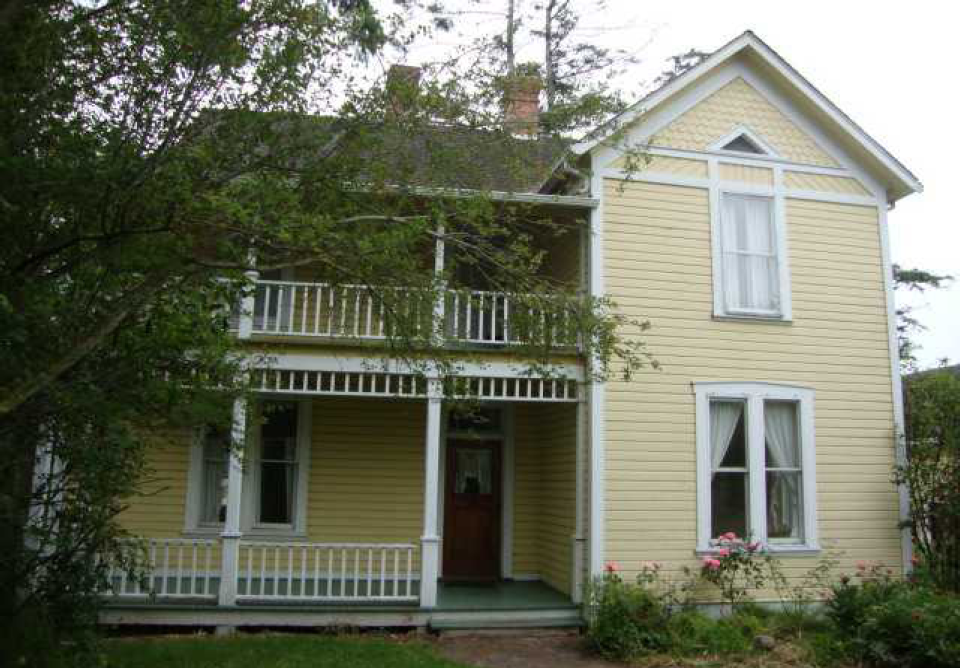
- Sergeant Clark House
- Nearest city: Oak Harbor, Washington
- Area: 17,400 acres (7,000 ha)
- Architect: Multiple
- Part of: Central Whidbey Island Historic District (ID73001869)
- Added to NRHP: December 12, 1973

The Sergeant Clark House, built in 1892, is a Vernacular style farmhouse located in Ebey's Landing National Historical Reserve in Coupeville on Whidbey Island, Washington. The Queen Anne Style—Eastlake movement architecture represents application of structural detail and ornamentation, and an early period of community growth.

The house is situated on a 40,000-square-foot (3,700 m^{2}) land parcel in and a part of the Thomas Coupe Donation Claim, in the Central Whidbey Island Historic District. Through continuous restoration, it has retained its integrity of design, materials, and workmanship.

== History ==
Thomas N. Richards was born in Devonshire England in 1847 and settled in Washington in 1869. He was likely a farmer and dairyman. According to Snohomish County records, he married Ruby Burce (born in Maine) in Seattle December 18, 1880. Ruby was the daughter of John Burce, an American Civil War veteran who died during the war, and Ada a resident of Whatcom County. Thomas and Ruby had sixteen children. Thomas Richards built the Sergeant Clark House in 1892. He died in 1899.

It was bought in 1908 by Sergeant Thomas Clark, a soldier stationed at nearby Fort Casey. Clark retired from the service and lived in the house until his death in 1930. "... Jo De Vries' ... grandfather, first ordnance sergeant Thomas Clark, a career Army man, was posted to Fort Casey around 1900. Her father, who was also named Thomas Clark, worked at the fort as a civilian engineer, under the first chief engineer, Mr. O.W. Degan. I was born in what was the old post office, up on the hill, De Vries recalls. At that time, the fort was bustling with 1,000 men. There was a hospital, a bakery, a bandstand, a tailor's shop, the post exchange, a blacksmith shop, and a jail, De Vries said. It was a lovely place. It makes her sad to think of the many old military buildings that have been torn down. De Vries remembers the huge noise made by the big guns. They shook the earth pretty good!"

Until 1941, the house was occupied by members of the Clark family, some of whom achieved important positions in county government. A son was a county engineer and a grandson, the county sheriff. In 1947 ownership of the house passed to Fred Burchell, who lived in one of the rooms on the lower floor until his death in 1969. The house sat vacant for ten years after Fred Burchell died and was deteriorating rapidly from neglect and vandalism. The previous owners, operators of a dairy farm, did not desire to restore the house or to sell to somebody who would. They agreed, however, to sell the house for removal from their land. Leonard and Linda Madsen purchased it in 1979 with the stipulation that the house would be moved to a new location. The new owners bought it under these conditions and moved it to its new site in July 1979, in the Central Whidbey Island Historic District on S. Main Street in Coupeville. The Madsen's completed restoration to the house in the mid-1980s.

=== New location ===
The original location of the Clark House was near the southwest corner of Fort Casey Road and Old State Highway. Before the house was moved, the new owners brought the matter before the local Historic Review Board. This group concluded that the plan to move the house to a nearby site was the best available option for preserving the structure. This conclusion was based on the lack of interest in the house on the part of the dairy farmers and on a number of other facts. Without attention, the house would soon deteriorate beyond saving.

Also, the proposed site was the nearest available one, still in the Central Whidbey Island Historic District, and easily visible from the original location of the house. The new location would "balance" with the Chauncey House, which is located across Main Street from the new site. The historic significance of the house was decided to derive from its architectural attributes, rather than from any associations with its original site."

=== Restoration ===
The walls were lath and plaster, which was badly deteriorated, especially on the second floor where rain has caused considerable damage. The perimeter walls were stripped to the studs on the inside and new wiring, plumbing and insulation were installed. All of interior walls were replaced with drywall except the interior hallways which retains the original lath and plaster. The plaster includes horsehair that was typical of the time to help keep the plaster connected to the keys. A new electric furnace was also installed at this time. Both Fireplaces were completely rebuilt with high-quality block and liners during the restoration but the chimney tops visible above the roof line were remade with the original bricks. Bricks from that time were typically darker red in color and higher quality (slightly thicker) than today's U.S. standard.

== Description ==
The Sergeant Clark House exemplifies the use of local materials and tools. The house used balloon framing constructed of lumber milled in Port Townsend. The timber was likely old-growth timber logged from the Olympic Peninsula just before President Grover Cleveland designated Olympic Peninsula as forest reserve in 1897. The high quality of the wood is one reason the house persists and the original double-hung windows show little wear and continue to operate.

=== Exterior ===
The west facade of the Clark House is visible through dense woods from Main Street. The trees extend only about fifty feet from the road, however, and the east facade looks out over open fields. The other facades are obscured from general view by the woods. The house, which has two stories and an attic, is basically rectangular with an intersecting side wing extending to the west.

The main part of the house has a gabled hip roof, while the wing has a plain gable. This design gives the house a balanced, symmetrical roof line from both the front and back. A spacious porch and upstairs verandah extend from the wing across the rest of the west facade. In the rear, there is a one-story extension. The roof is new wood shingles which faithfully replicate the roofing in historic photographs. Except for fishscale shingles above the window level, bevelled siding is used throughout. Fenestration is generally two-over-two double-hung wood sash. Small triangular windows in the gable and gablet light the attic and echo the roof line.

=== Interior ===
On the first floor are a living room, a parlor, a dining room, a kitchen, a bathroom, and a service porch. A central stairway leads to three upstairs bedrooms. All the rooms have high ceilings and generous dimensions. Original fir flooring is present in all of the rooms.

=== Neighborhood ===
To the south is a large frame house of historic character. To the west are two badly deteriorated out-buildings and, beyond them, the verdant fields of the Engle Dairy Farm. Another historic house, the Nuttal Home, is located to the north, on the other side of Fort Casey Road. The new location, 301 South Main, is to the northwest of the old, across more grassy pasture land. It is visible from the original site and from the Nuttal Home. To the south is a large dark-stained bungalow. Across Main Street is a small Cape Cod cottage and a large turn-of-the-century house. The latter, though it has fairly recent composition siding, retains its original massing and detailing.

== Gallery ==
- National Register of Historic Places - Central Whidbey Island Historic District Photos
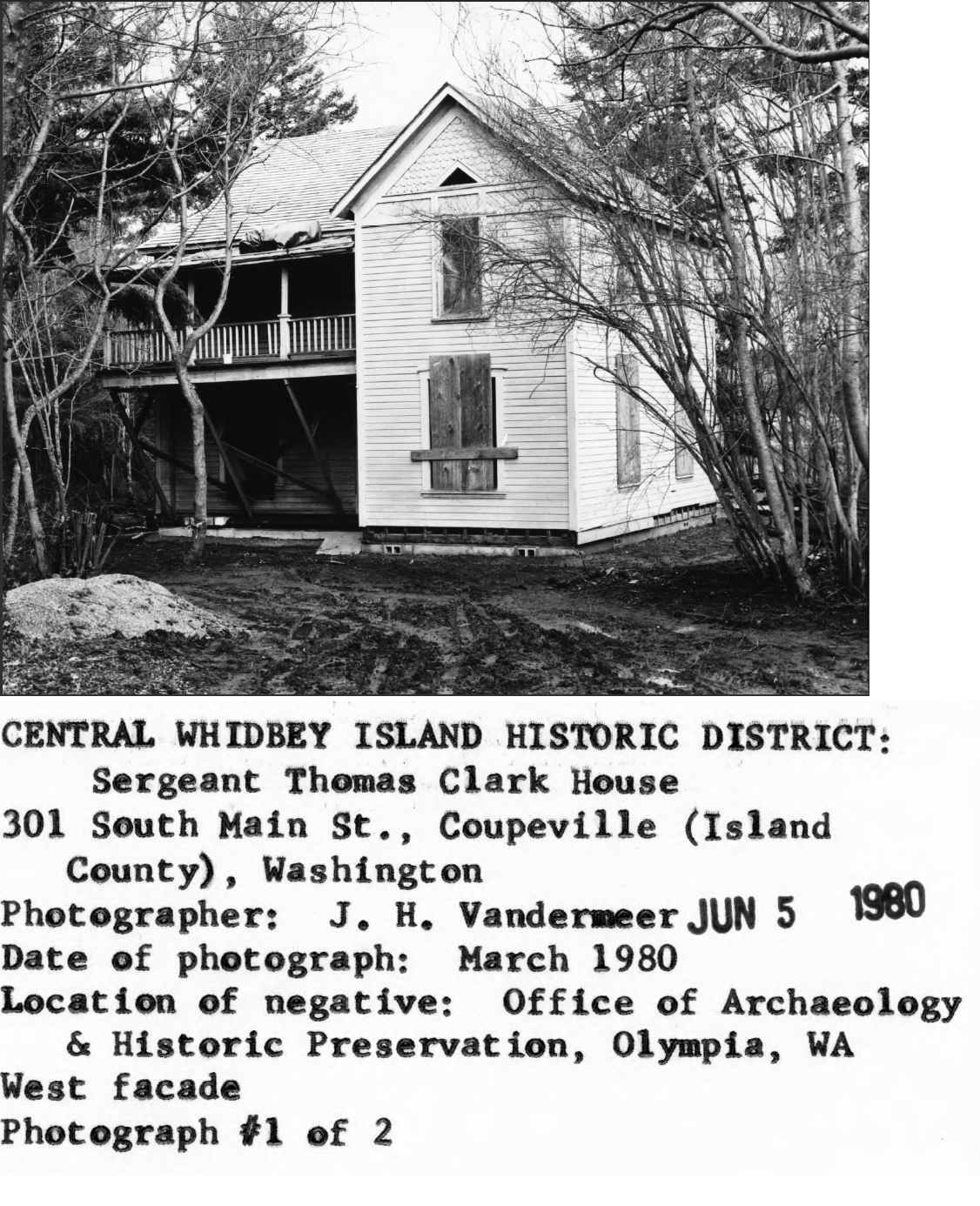
Sergeant Clark House - Front view

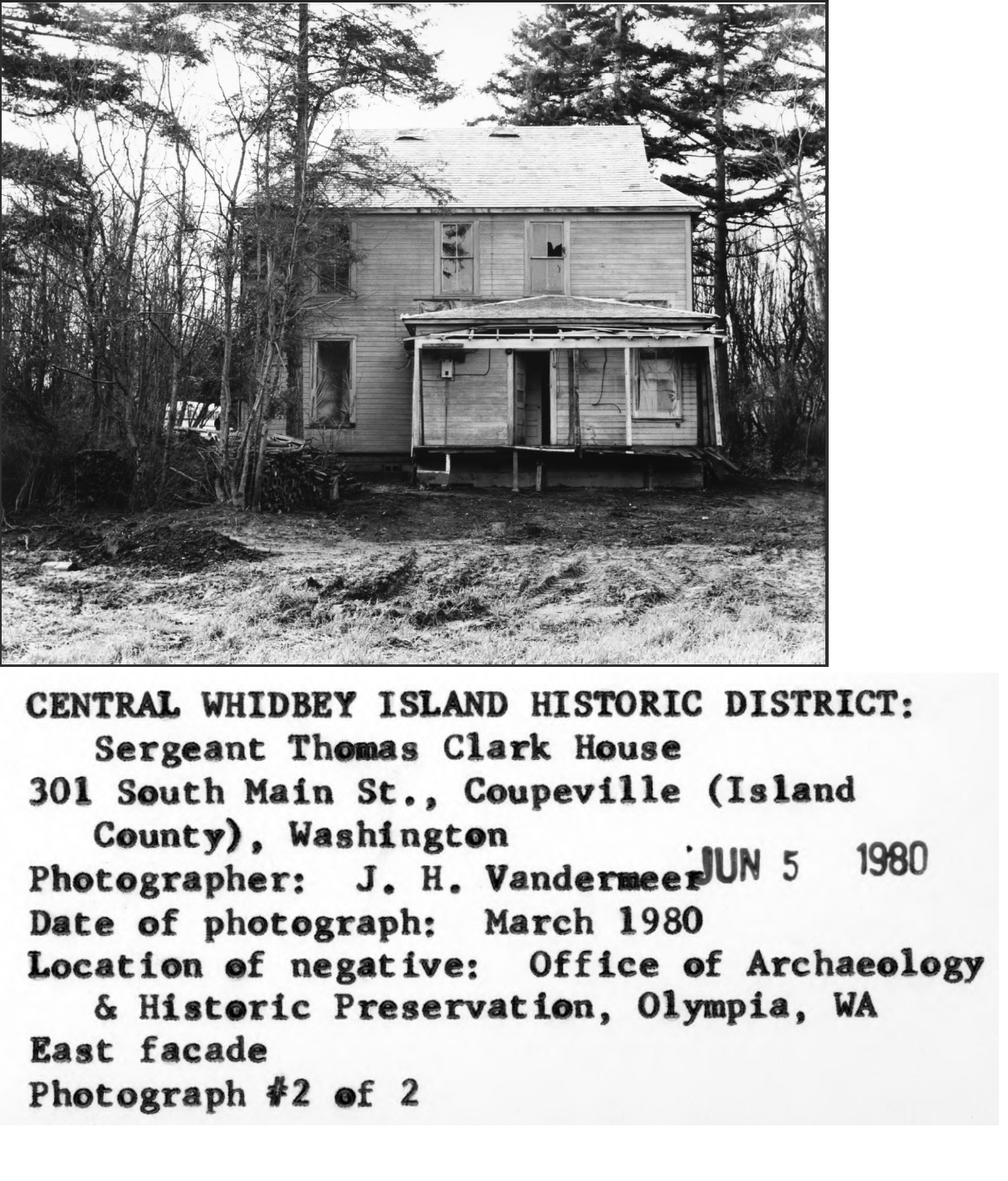
Sergeant Clark House - Back view

== See also ==
- Queen Anne Style
  - Eastlake movement
  - Stick-Eastlake
