= National Register of Historic Places listings in Island County, Washington =

Location of Island County in Washington

This list presents the full set of buildings, structures, objects, sites, or districts designated on the National Register of Historic Places in Island County, Washington, and offers brief descriptive information about each of them. The National Register recognizes places of national, state, or local historic significance across the United States. Out of over 90,000 National Register sites nationwide, Washington is home to approximately 1,500, and 16 of those are found partially or wholly in Island County.

This National Park Service list is complete through NPS recent listings posted August 28, 2026.

== Current listings ==
	Name on the Register	Image	Date listed	Location	City or town	Description
1	Cama Beach Resort	Cama Beach Resort	May 15, 2001 (#01000505)	1880 SW Camano Dr. 48°08′36″N 122°30′37″W	Camano Island	
2	Central Whidbey Island Historic District	Central Whidbey Island Historic District	December 12, 1973 (#73001869)	South of Oak Harbor, roughly 6 mi (9.7 km) either side of Coupeville; 48°12′43″N 122°41′12″W	Oak Harbor vicinity	
3	Deception Pass Bridge	Deception Pass Bridge	July 16, 1982 (#82004285)	Rte. 20; 48°24′31″N 122°38′37″W	Anacortes	Historic Bridges and Tunnels in Washington TR, also extends into Skagit County
4	Deception Pass State Park-Cornet Bay Fire Circle	Deception Pass State Park-Cornet Bay Fire Circle	December 6, 2019 (#100004769)	Cornet Bay Road; 48°23′44″N 122°38′18″W	Oak Harbor	
5	Deception Pass State Park-Cornet Bay Incinerator		December 6, 2019 (#100004771)	Cornet Bay Road; 48°23′40″N 122°38′17″W	Oak Harbor	
6	Deception Pass State Park-Cranberry Lake Bathing and Picnic Area Historic District	Deception Pass State Park-Cranberry Lake Bathing and Picnic Area Historic District	December 4, 2019 (#100004770)	41020 WA 20; 48°23′33″N 122°38′56″W	Oak Harbor	
7	Deception Pass State Park-Cranberry Lake Caretaker's Area Historic District	Deception Pass State Park-Cranberry Lake Caretaker's Area Historic District	November 22, 2019 (#100004647)	41020 WA 20; 48°23′47″N 122°38′48″W	Oak Harbor	
8	Deception Pass State Park-North Beach Picnic Area Historic District	Deception Pass State Park-North Beach Picnic Area Historic District	November 22, 2019 (#100004645)	41020 WA 20; 48°24′13″N 122°38′52″W	Oak Harbor	
9	Colonel Granville & Henrietta Haller House	Colonel Granville & Henrietta Haller House	December 2, 2022 (#100008426)	1 NE Front St. 48°13′15″N 122°41′09″W	Coupeville	
10	Kristoferson Dairy	Kristoferson Dairy	January 3, 2012 (#11000986)	393 N. East Camano Dr. 48°13′28″N 122°28′51″W	Stanwood vicinity	part of the Barns of Washington State MPS
11	Benjamin Loers House	Benjamin Loers House	August 29, 1977 (#77001334)	30861 SR20; 48°17′04″N 122°40′07″W	Oak Harbor	Address changed from 2046 Swantown Rd. per WISAARD Id:662553
12	Olympic Club	Olympic Club	May 28, 1991 (#91000630)	230 1st St. 48°02′28″N 122°24′29″W	Langley	
13	Site 45-IS-2	Site 45-IS-2	December 11, 2008 (#08001185)	Address Restricted	Camano Island	Also known as the Cama Beach Archaeological Site.
14	Smith Island Light Station	Smith Island Light Station	April 6, 1978 (#78002746)	Northwest of Oak Harbor; 48°19′07″N 122°50′37″W	Oak Harbor	Lost due to erosion
15	Schooner Suva	Schooner Suva	December 29, 2025 (#100012445)	Coupeville Wharf at 24 Front Street; 48°13′17″N 122°41′18″W	Coupeville	
16	Utsalady Ladies Aid Building	Utsalady Ladies Aid Building	September 25, 1998 (#98001186)	79 Utsalady Rd. 48°15′08″N 122°28′37″W	Camano Island	

== See also ==
- National Register of Historic Places listings in Washington state
- Listings in neighboring counties: Jefferson, Kitsap, San Juan, Skagit, Snohomish
- Historic preservation
- History of Washington (state)
- Index of Washington (state)-related articles
