= Ferry House (Ebey's Landing) =

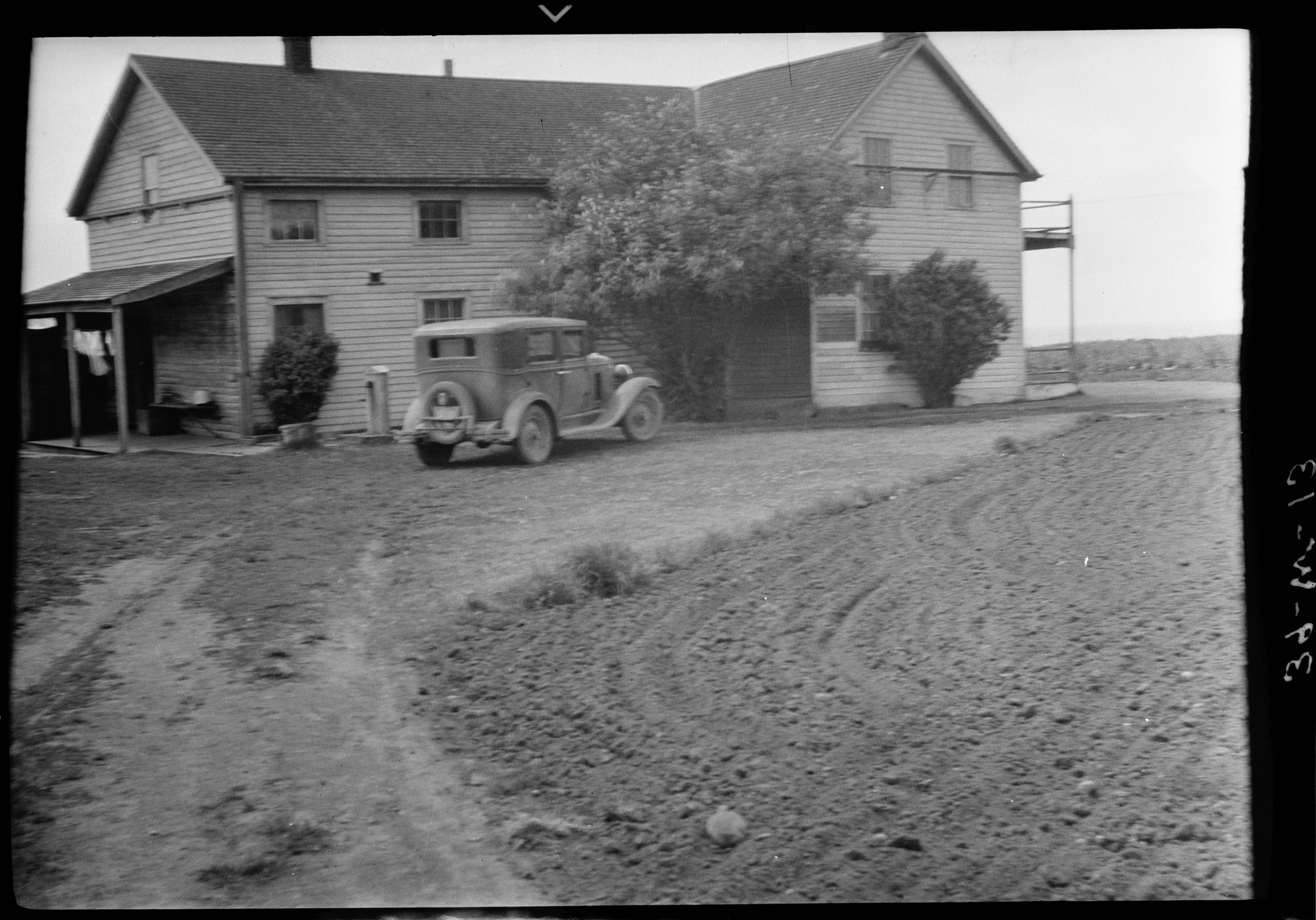
- 1934 northeast view of Ferry House
- Interactive map of the Ferry House area

General information
- Architectural style: Vernacular residence with Greek Revival elements
- Location: Near Coupeville, Washington, United States of America
- Coordinates: 48.191565°N 122.704875°W
- Construction started: 1859
- Completed: 1860

Technical details
- Size: Approx. 2,800 sq ft (260 m^{2})

Design and construction
- Engineer: Winfield Ebey (brother of Isaac N. Ebey

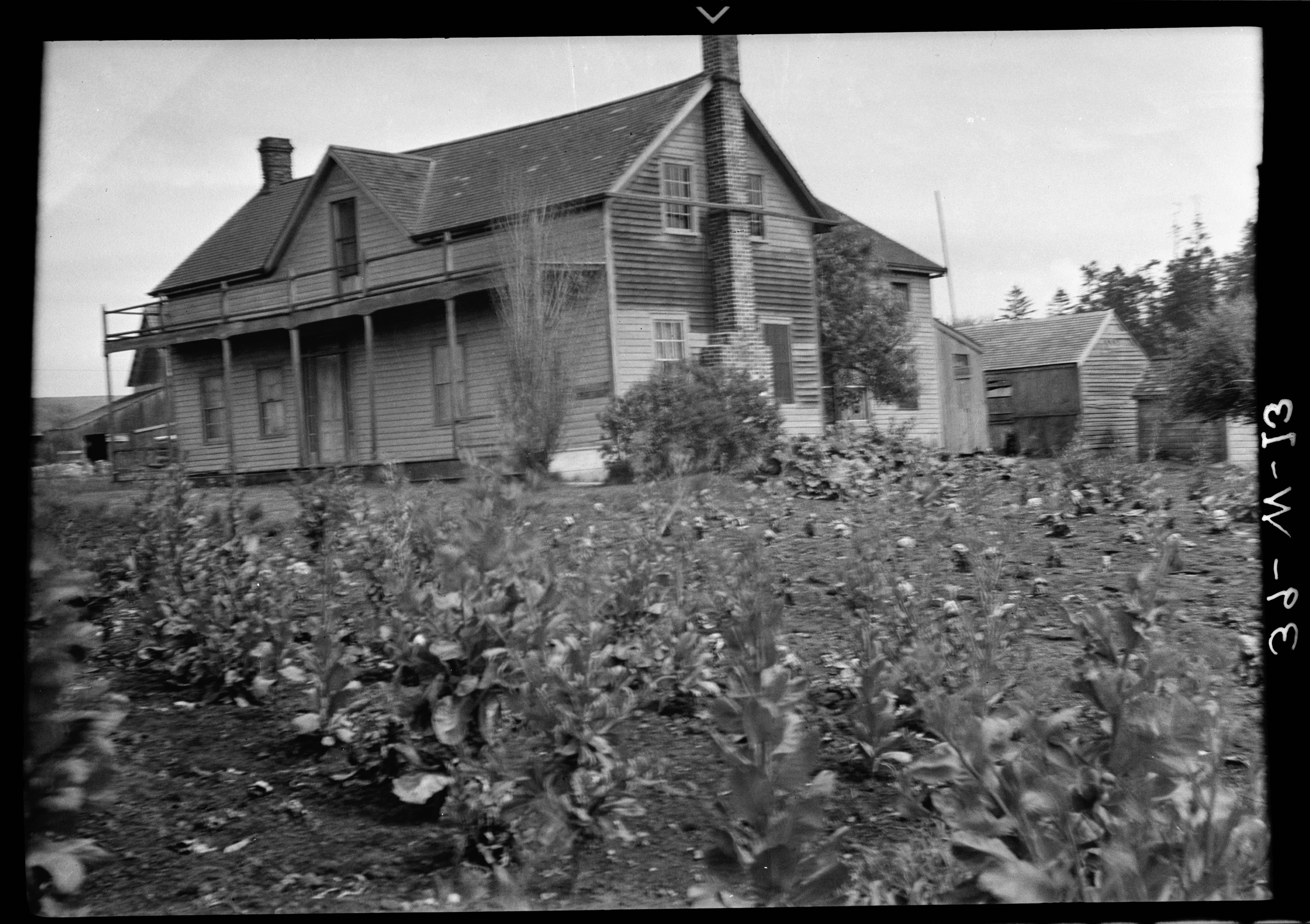
Front view, Ferry House, 1934

One of the oldest residential buildings in Washington, the Ferry House was built in 1860 by Winfield Scott Ebey as an inn to provide financial stability for his brother's children, who were orphaned when Isacc Neff Ebey was assassinated by northern indigenous tribes (possibly Haida). Once completed and opened for business, the building was named The Ebey Inn. The prime location across Admiralty Inlet from Port Townsend meant a steady flow of travelers and income for the three Ebey children. With no other nearby accommodations, the Inn — which housed a post office, a tavern, and rooms for overnight guests — quickly became an important place for sailors and other travelers to rest before continuing their journeys to Coupeville, Whidbey Island, La Conner, Washington, and points further north. Travelers and locals could also purchase merchandise and groceries at the Inn, which served ferry traffic to and from Port Townsend until a new ferry dock was constructed near Fort Casey at the turn of the 20th century. The house stayed in the Ebey family for 57 years, until Isaac Ebey's grandson sold the old Inn in 1917.

The old Inn is currently owned by the National Park Service. The Ferry House became part of the 17,500-acre (71 km^{2}) Ebey's Landing National Historical Reserve created in 1978 to protect the rural working landscape and community on Central Whidbey Island. It is one of more than 400 historic buildings in the NHR.

== Construction ==
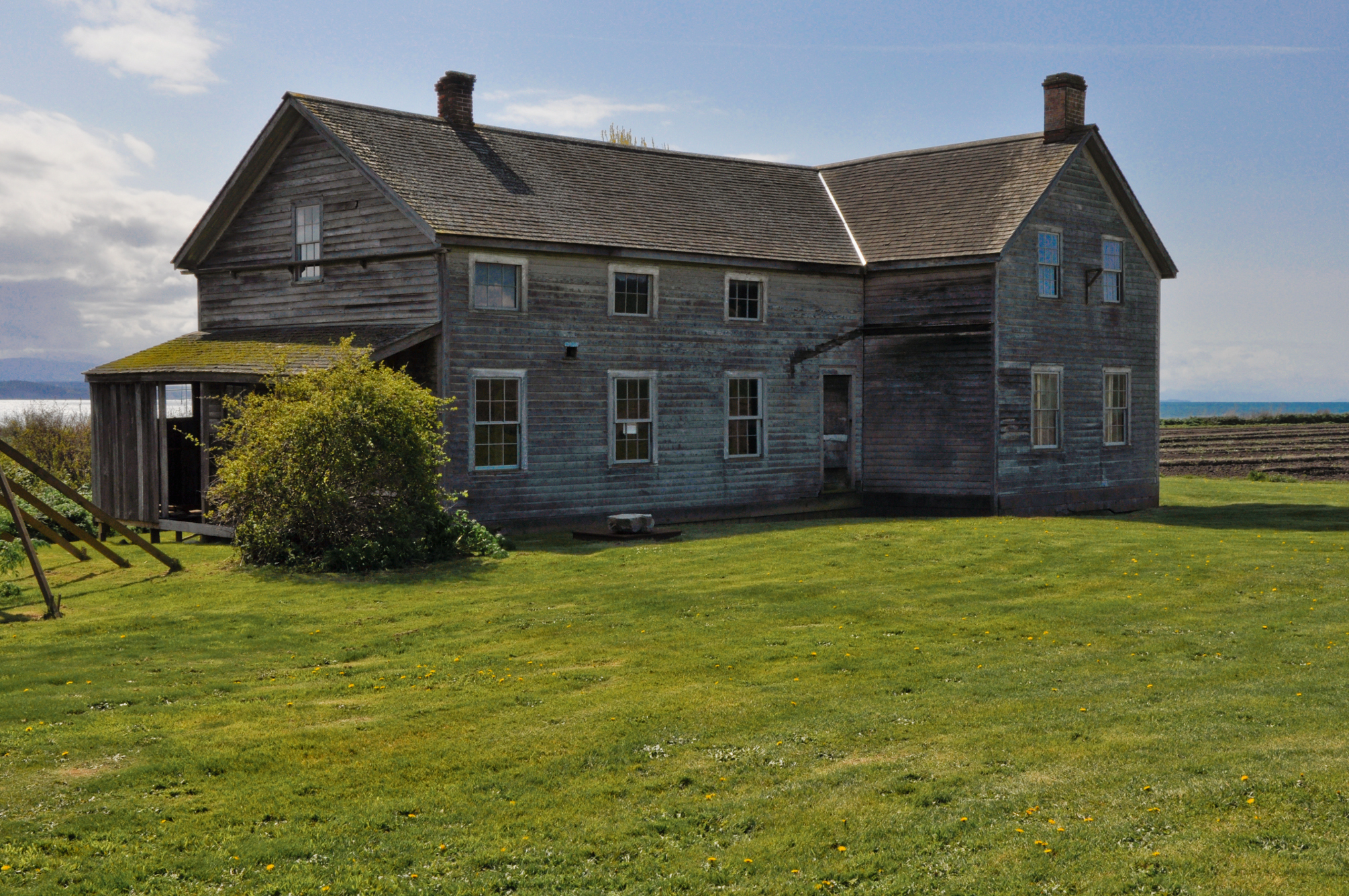
Ferry House, April 2010

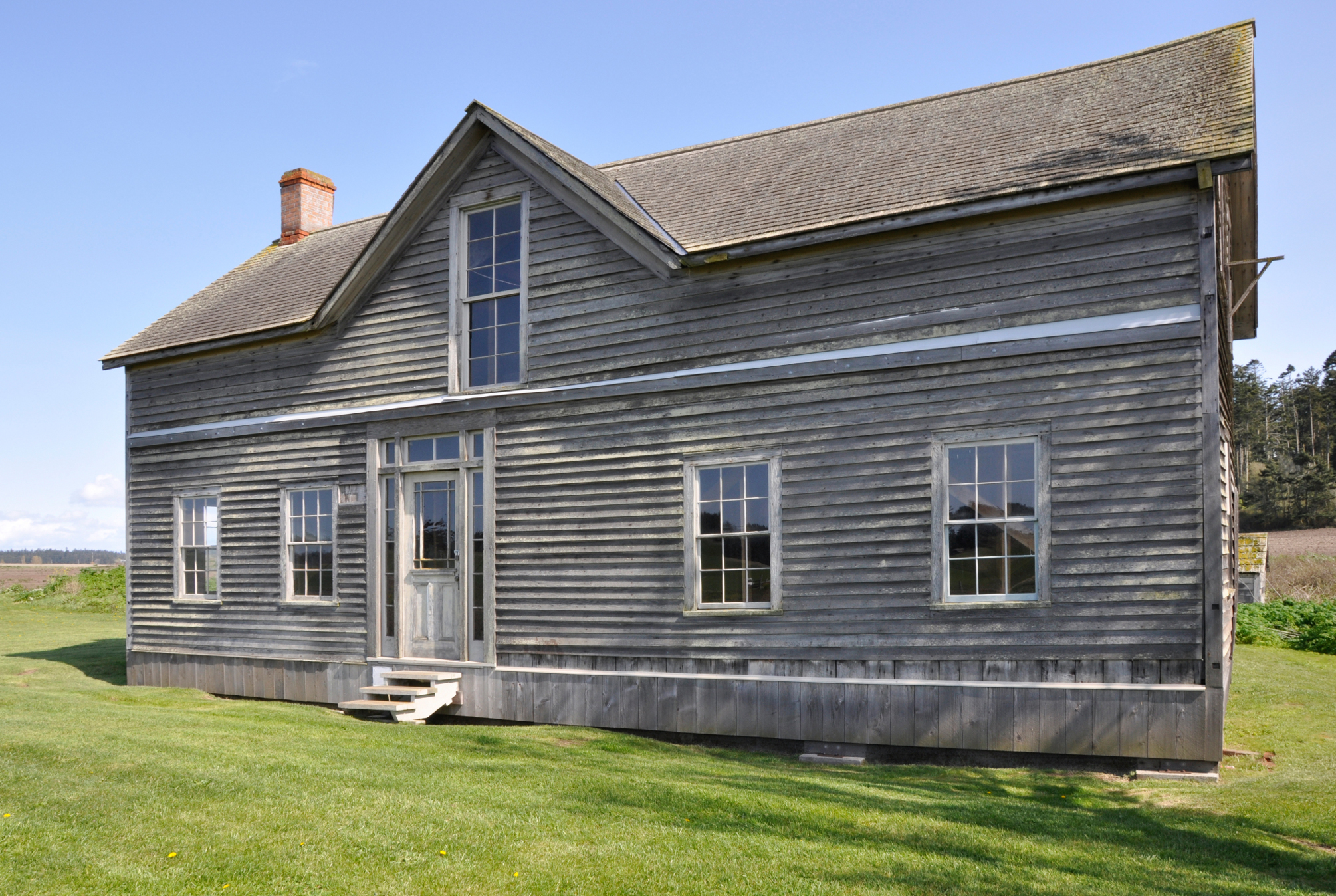
Front of Ferry House, April 2010

Winfield Ebey used wood from his brother Isaac's cabins — abandoned after his murder — to construct the Inn. Though they no longer exist, the cabins originally stood on the opposite side of the ravine that runs behind the Ferry House. The structure is a 1 1/2-story vernacular residence with Greek Revival elements, clapboard siding, a wood-shingled gable roof, and a gable-roofed dormer on the north facade.

Like most pioneer homes, the house started out small and additions were made as they were needed. It was constructed with salvaged 1-by-12 fir planks that extend from the bottom of the first floor to the top of the second. The two floors are held up with two-by-fours attached to the exterior walls. Several of the interior walls show weathering, proving they were exterior walls at some point.

In 1917, a lightning strike ripped the siding off the west wall, busted out two windows, and destroyed one of the two original interior chimneys. The chimney was replaced with an exterior one, but today that chimney is now gone. The Inn also had an upper veranda which lasted for several decades before either being blown off, rotting away, or dismantled, it's unsure which. You can still see where the second story door to the veranda was located just above the front door, though today that door is a window.

Modern utilities — like indoor plumbing and electricity — have never been added to the Ferry House.

== Modern day ==
Today, the house is under the protection of the United States Government. It stands as a time capsule that provides a unique glimpse into Washington's early Territorial history. While the house remains locked year round, the grounds are open to pedestrians.

Wallpaper on several interior walls of the Ferry House, as well as the front door, was added by a film crew in 1998 for the scenes in the 1999 movie Snow Falling On Cedars.

A framework of two-by-sixes has been constructed in the living room, parlor, and first floor bedroom to prevent the second floor from collapsing.

In 2010, the Ferry House was one of 25 finalists competing for a share of one million dollars in funding for restoration and preservation provided by American Express in partnership with the National Trust for Historic Preservation. On Sunday, May 2, 2010, the National Park Service unlocked the doors of the old Inn for an open house as part of the Seattle-Puget Sound Partners in Preservation Initiative. While the public could only tour the first floor, it was the first time in many years the house had visitors inside.

== See also ==
- USS Massachusetts, Battle of Port Gamble
- Washington Territory
