= Coupeville grain wharf =

- U.S. Historic district – Contributing property
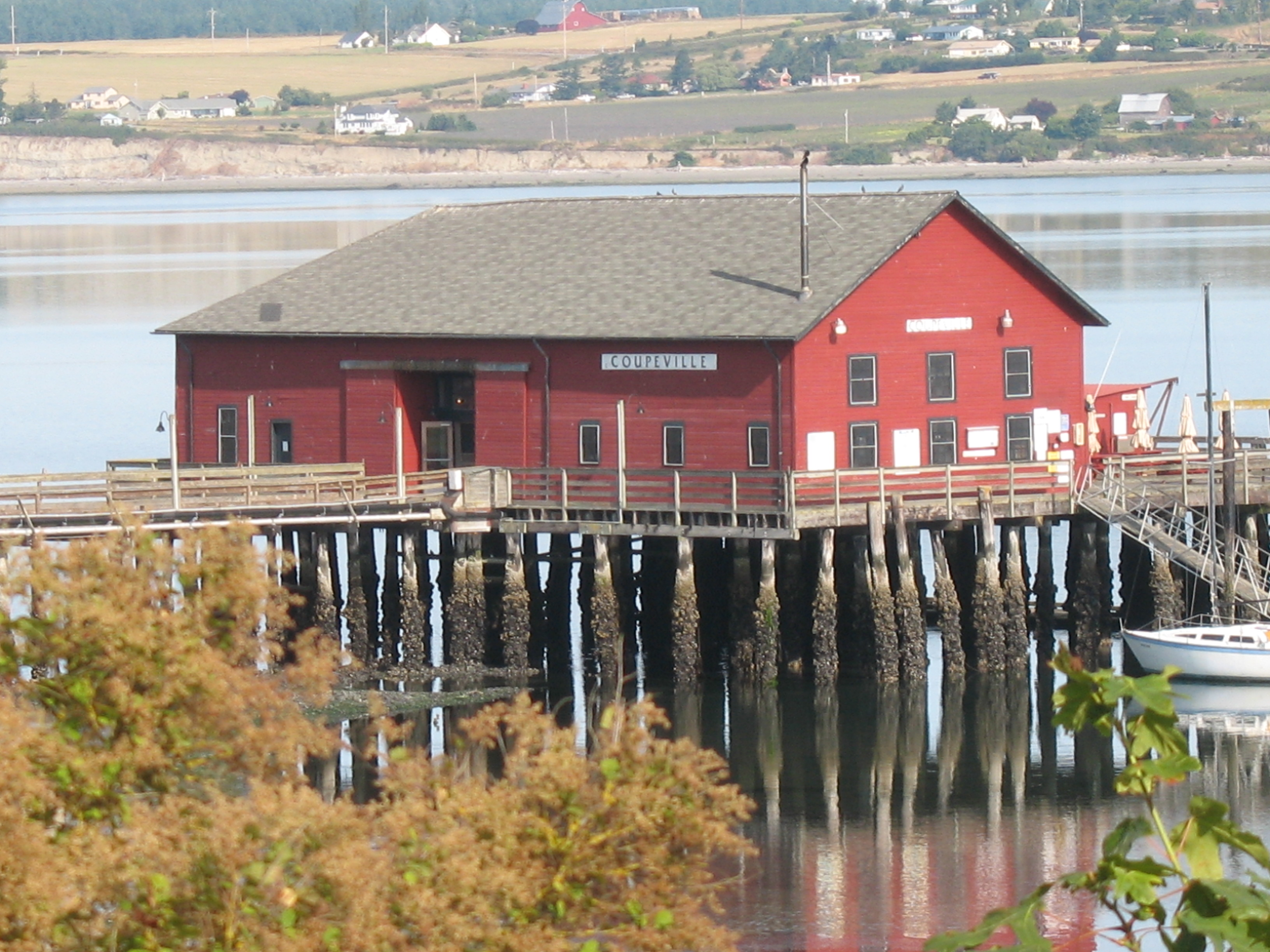
- Coupeville grain wharf in 2008

- Location within Washington (state)
- Location: NW Alexander Road, Coupeville, Washington
- Coordinates: 48.2226°N 122.6883°W
- Built: c. 1900
- Architect: Multiple
- Part of: Central Whidbey Island Historic District (ID73001869)
- Designated CP: December 12, 1973

The Coupeville grain wharf is a wharf built in 1905 in Coupeville, Washington. It was formerly used for exporting grain produced on Whidbey Island. It is a contributing property to the Central Whidbey Island Historic District, registered on the National Register of Historic Places in 1973.
