= Guy Bond =

American psychologist

Guy Loraine Bond (May 3, 1904 – August 29, 1980) was an educational psychologist who made significant contributions to research in reading and literacy. Bond's work with Robert Dykstra on The First Grade Studies is perhaps the most famous of his contributions. His areas of study were reading, elementary education, and curriculum education psychology.

Born in Coupeville, Washington, Bond was educated at Western Washington State College and the Universities of Alabama and Columbia. Bond was a professor at State College, Fredonia, New York from 1936–1937. He was a professor in the Faculty of Education at the University of Minnesota from 1937 to 1942 and 1945 to 1966, where an endowed faculty chair was established in his name. During 1942 to 1945 he worked for the US Navy in Washington DC.

== Publications ==
- Reading Difficulties: Their Diagnosis and Correction by Guy L. Bond and Miles A. Tinker, 1951
- The Cooperative Resesarch Program in First-Grade Reading Instruction (Bond & Dykstra, 1967)
- Developmental reading in high school by Guy L. Bond and Eva Bond, New York, The Macmillan Company, 1941
- Review of Teaching the child to Read by Nina Jacob, Guy L. Bond and Eva Bond, "The Elementary School Journal", Mar 1944, vol 44, no 7, p430-431
- Teaching the child to read by Guy L. Bond and Eva Bond Wagner, New York, The Macmillan Company, 1958
