= C. T. Terry =

American politician

Member of the Washington House of Representatives for the 45th district
- In office 1893–1897

Personal details
- Born: February 26, 1835 Onondaga County, New York, United States
- Died: July 6, 1922 (aged 87) Coupeville, Washington, United States
- Party: Republican

Charles Townsend Terry (February 26, 1835 – July 6, 1922) was an American politician in the state of Washington. He served in the Washington House of Representatives from 1895 to 1897.
