= USRC Jefferson Davis =

Ship of the U.S. Revenue Cutter Service

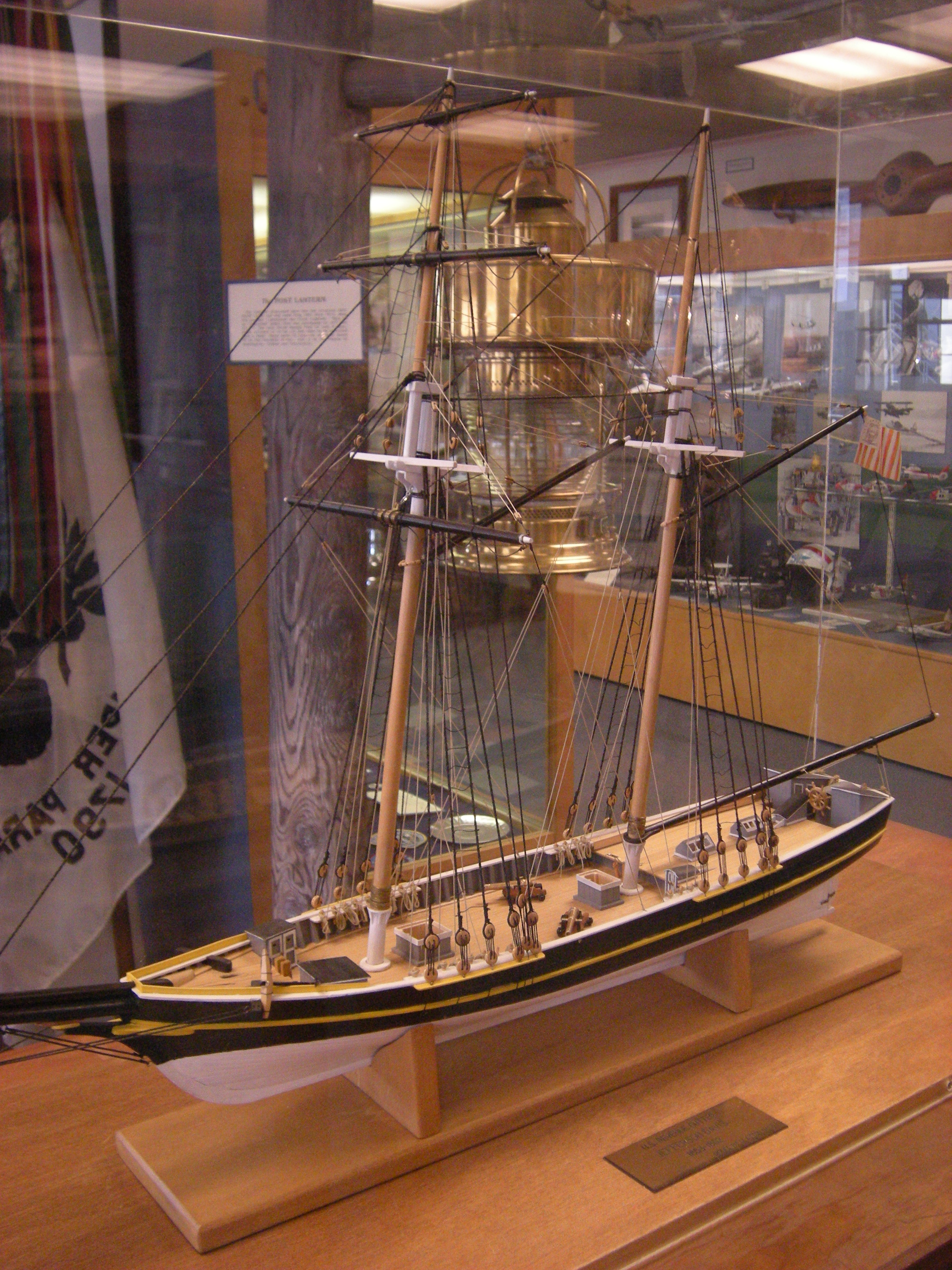
- Model of the USRC Jefferson Davis, Coast Guard Museum/Northwest, Seattle, Washington

History

United States
- Name: USRC Jefferson Davis also referred to as USRC Davis
- Namesake: Jefferson Davis, then Secretary of War
- Owner: U.S. Revenue Cutter Service
- Builder: J.M. Hood, Bristol, Rhode Island
- Completed: 1853
- Commissioned: 1853
- Decommissioned: 1862
- Status: converted to a marine hospital

General characteristics
- Class & type: Cushing Class topsail schooner
- Displacement: 160 tons
- Length: 93 ft (28 m)
- Beam: 21 ft (6.4 m)
- Draft: 9 ft (2.7 m)
- Complement: 13
- Armament: 6 × 12 pdr (5.4 kg) cannons

USRC Jefferson Davis was a United States Revenue Cutter Service topsail schooner of the Cushing class built in 1853. She was named for Jefferson Davis, then United States Secretary of War under President Franklin Pierce, and later president of the Confederate States of America.

== Construction ==
The ship, a topsail schooner, was built by J.M. Hood of Bristol, Rhode Island for US$9,000. One online Coast Guard source describes her as a 90-plus foot (27-plus meter) vessel with 150 short tons (140 t) displacement; exhibit text at the Coast Guard Museum/Northwest describes her as a 94 ft 8 in (28.85 m) vessel with 177 short tons (161 t) displacement, 23 ft 1 in (7.04 m) beam, and 9-foot (2.7 m) draft, with six 12 pdr (5.4 kg) guns.

== History ==
After surviving a hurricane in 1853 with slight damage, the ship put into Charleston, South Carolina for repairs, then sailed to around Cape Horn and arrived at San Francisco in July 1854 to serve on the West Coast. Continuing up the coast to arrive in Port Townsend, Washington September 28, 1854, Jefferson Davis became the first cutter stationed north of San Francisco.

Under Captain William C. Pease, Jefferson Davis participated in the suppression of a Native American uprising in Olympia, Washington in 1855, during the Puget Sound War. Later, in Bellingham, Washington, the entire crew except for the captain deserted to join the Fraser Canyon Gold Rush. One Coast Guard source says Jefferson Davis was converted to a "Marine Hospital Boat" in 1862; however, other sources (including exhibit text in the Coast Guard Museum/Northwest) say that it was sold that year to Grennan & Craney Co. of Utsalady, Washington for US$2920. According to one of the latter sources, Grennan & Craney Co. "refitted and sent her to China, carrying as cargo a flat-bottomed sternwheeler, which was to be supplied with the engines from Tom Wright's old Enterprise, dismantled on the Chehalis."

Coupeville, Washington, on Whidbey Island was named for Captain Thomas Coupe, once Jefferson Davis's sailing master.
