= Isaac N. Ebey =

American murder victim (1818–1857)

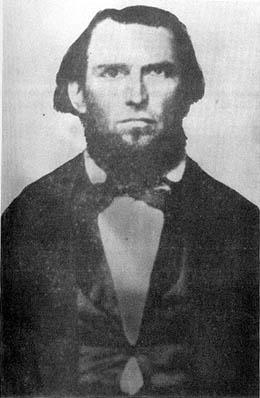
- Born: Isaac Neff Ebey; January 22, 1818; Columbus, Ohio
- Died: August 11, 1857 (aged 39); In the vicinity of Coupeville, Washington
- Cause of death: Assassination
- Resting place: Sunnyside Cemetery, Coupeville, Washington; 48.205736°N 122.705673°W
- Known for: First permanent settler on Whidbey Island. Named Olympia, Washington. Helped separate Oregon and Washington Territories. Infamous murder.
- Spouse(s): Rebecca Whitley Davis (1822–1853); Emily Palmer Sconce (c. 1827–1863).
- Children: Eason Benton Ebey. Jacob Mathew Ebey. Rebecca Harriet ('Hetty') Ebey.
- Relatives: Jacob Neff Ebey (father). Sarah Anne Harriet Blue (mother). Mary Ebey (sister). Elizabeth Ruth Ebey (sister). Winfield Scott Ebey (brother). Sarah M. Ebey (sister). Phoebe Judson (co-in-law).

Colonel Isaac Neff Ebey (January 22, 1818 – August 11, 1857) was the first permanent white resident of Whidbey Island, Washington.

Ebey was born in Columbus, Ohio in 1818. During his childhood Ebey's father, Jacob, moved the family to Adair County, Missouri, where as a young man Ebey was trained in the law. At age 25, Ebey married Rebecca Davis and they later had two sons, Eason (who became Phoebe Judson's son-in-law) and Ellison. Born with a naturally adventurous spirit, Isaac temporarily left his wife and young sons in Missouri to explore the American west – specifically the Pacific Coast.

== Journey West ==
During his journey west, Ebey briefly tried his hand at gold-mining during the California gold-rush and then headed north to Oregon Territory. After arriving in the Puget Sound region he went to work for the U.S. Customs service. While with the service, Ebey spent some time in Olympia, the city he is credited with naming in honor of the Olympic Peninsula mountains to the west of Puget Sound. Ebey also sponsored a statute to name King County, Washington. Hearing of the islands in the north end of the sound, Ebey came upon Whidbey Island and fell in love with the natural beauty, climate, and rich land perfect for farming.

== Homesteading Whidbey Island ==
In October 1850, Ebey moved from Olympia to Whidbey Island. When Congress passed the Donation Land Claim Act in 1850, Ebey claimed 640 acres (1.00 sq mi; 2.6 km^{2}) for himself and his family overlooking Admiralty Inlet then wrote his wife to prepare for a move west with their sons.

The remainder of Ebey's family followed in October 1854. Among those of Ebey's family who came to the Pacific Northwest were: Ebey's parents, Jacob and Sarah; siblings, Mary, Winfield, and Ruth; Mary's two children, Almira and Polk Wright; a cousin, George Beam. Jacob Ebey claimed ridge land overlooking what is today called Ebey's Prairie. On the same ridge, Isaac Ebey built a blockhouse for protection against raiding Indians. Isaac and Jacob Ebey's land would prove to be some of the most productive in the area and word of this fortune traveled, drawing settlers from the east into the region and starting a rush of settlers who claimed most of the prairie-land by the beginning of 1853. By 1860, all of the best farmland had already been claimed.

== Establishing a presence ==
Like other American farmers of European descent on Whidbey Island, Ebey grew wheat and potatoes, as well as onions, carrots, cabbages, parsnips, peas, barley and other grains. Taking advantage of the natural landing at his property on the shores of Admiralty Inlet he built a dock for the commercial ship traffic on Puget Sound in order to facilitate trade from Port Townsend on the Olympic Peninsula. Because most transportation in the area moved by water, the location of what was now called Ebey's Landing (on the main Puget Sound shipping route) minimized transportation costs. The landing remained active until the turn of the 20th Century when a new dock was built at Fort Casey, just a few miles away.

During his nine years in the Pacific Northwest, Isaac Ebey was a vital player in territorial affairs. Serving as prosecuting attorney for the Whidbey Island community he also represented Thurston County (Olympia) in the Oregon Territorial Legislature when that county still stretched to the 49th parallel. Ebey also assisted in helping persuade the legislature to sign the Monticello Memorial, separating Oregon and Washington Territories in 1853, and assisted in breaking off parts of Thurston County into four smaller areas: Island, Jefferson, King, and Pierce Counties. Appointed by President Franklin Pierce to be collector for the Puget Sound district and inspector of revenues at the new state capital in Olympia, Ebey relocated his customs office to Port Townsend and made it the official port of entry for Puget Sound.

== Colonel Ebey ==
In 1855 the Washington Territorial Legislature passed the first set of regulations establishing Washington Territorial Volunteer Militia. These regulations required that each council district (upper house in the territorial legislature) elect a Colonel, Lieutenant Colonel and a Major. These individuals were expected to divide their council districts into smaller areas with 100 men in each. Colonel Ebey was elected to a three-year term for Jefferson and Island counties. After raising a company of volunteers to fight in the mainland Indian wars of 1855–1856, Col. Ebey was again elected by this company to act as their Captain. Well respected among the residents, prospective volunteers refused to enlist unless they would serve under his command and named the fort they built on an island in the Snohomish river after him (not to be confused with Fort Ebey on Whidbey Island, Washington State built during WW2).

== Death ==
Rebecca Ebey was never happy about the family's encounters with local indigenous peoples. Living some distance from the other Euro-American farmers, she stayed close to home managing the household during Isaac's long absences. Already weakened by tuberculosis, Rebecca died in 1853 following the difficult birth, and subsequent death, of the Ebeys' newborn daughter, Sarah. Ebey soon married Emily Palmer Sconce, a widow with a daughter named Anna.

In 1857, a party of northern (possibly Haida) natives from the Kake Tribe of Alaska traveled by canoe into Puget Sound on a mission of vengeance. Following the death of one of their chiefs and 27 other tribal members in an attack by the USS Massachusetts the previous year, the party searched for a white Hyas Tyee (great chief) in retaliation. Originally, the intended victim was Dr. John Coe Kellogg, who lived near the present day Admiralty Head lighthouse. On the hot summer evening of August 11, unable to locate Kellogg (who was out of the area), the natives beached at Ebey's Landing and traversed the steep cliff up to Ebey's home. Knocking on Isaac Ebey's door, the natives called him out of the house, shot him dead, and scalped him.

Emily and the children fled to Jacob Ebey's blockhouse on the ridge, and George and Lucretia Corliss (in-laws of Phoebe Judson) escaped into the forest. Unwilling to remain on the farm, Emily abandoned it, leaving forever with her daughter Anna. Isaac Ebey's relatives raised Ellison and Eason, and the two brothers later divided their father's farm between them.

There is question whether the raiders were actually Haida (as inscribed on a historical marker at Ebey's Landing). Traditional stories of the Keex' Kwáan (Kake) tribe of Tlingits tell of the raid being led by a female relative of the slain chief in the Massachusetts attack. Those stories also tell that the female leader of the raid was a member of the Tsaagweidí clan. In fact, the Puget Sound Herald of Steilacoom published an article fifteen months after Ebey's assassination stating the Kake and Stikine nations, "numbering a couple hundred," were responsible for the "cold blooded murder." However, it was never known which particular tribe perpetrated the death and beheading of Ebey.

=== Ebey's scalp ===
Isaac Ebey's headless remains were interred in the original Ebey family cemetery located at Ebey's Prairie on the bluff overlooking Isaac and Rebecca's home. Ebey's first wife Rebecca was already interred there, along with their daughter Hetty. The rest of the Ebey family is officially interred at Sunnyside Cemetery, 50 feet (15 m) from the burial place of Isaac.

Captains Swanston and Charles Dodd of the Hudson's Bay Company steamer Beaver attempted to purchase Ebey's scalp about a year after his death, but were unsuccessful when the Kake Nation took the request as a first step in an attack of their village. It is rumored the Kake refused to sell Ebey's scalp because it was customary to dance around the scalps of their enemies killed in battle during annual feasts. They also believed the scalp held great family importance and should be handed down through generations.

About three years after Ebey's murder, Captain Dodd now on the steamer Labouchere again attempted to purchase the scalp of his slain friend, and was successful. Dodd acquired the scalp for a liberal reward of "six blankets, 3 pipes, 1 cotton handkerchief, 6 heads of tobacco, 1 fthm. cotton," and gave it to A. M. Poe, Esq. to be returned to Ebey's brother, Winfield. On April 5, 1860, Winfield Ebey noted in his diary the much awaited return of his brother's "poor head":

Captain Coupe got over from Port Townsend bringing my friend A. M. Poe, Esquire. Mr. P. brings my brother's scalp which was recovered from the Northern tribes by Captain Dodd. At last this memento is received. At last a portion of the mutilated remains of my dear brother is returned. Near three years has elapsed since his murder and now his poor head [or a portion of it] returns to his home. The skin of the head is entire contained, the ears and most of the hair. The hair looks quite natural. It is a sad memento of the past.

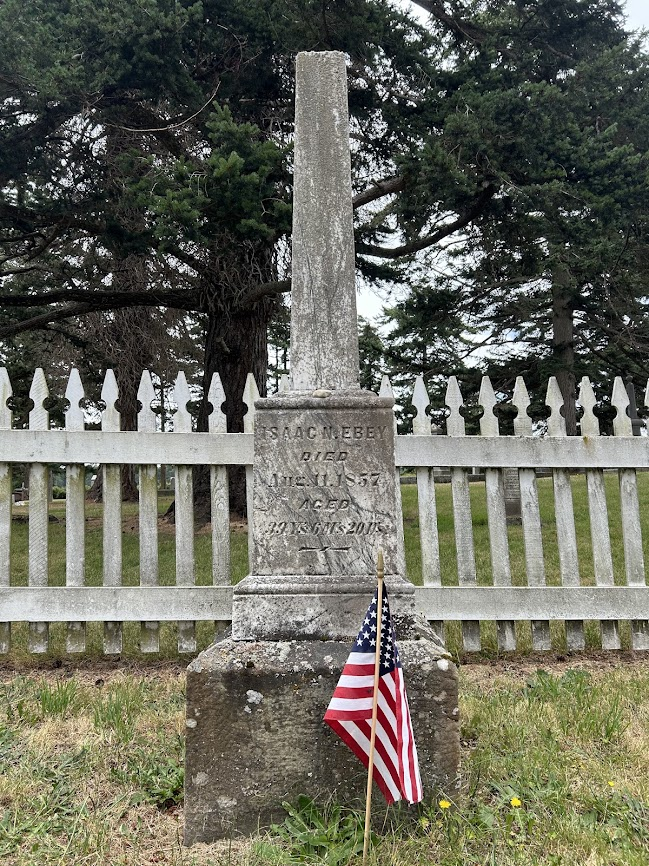
Ebey's grave marker in Sunnyside Cemetery

While some historians insist Winfield—a prolific diarist—had the scalp buried with his brother's body, no record of this claim exists. After Winfield's death in 1865, at least five separate accounts maintain that Ebey's sister, Mary Ebey Bozarth, inherited the relic. Albert Kellogg, the son of Dr. John Kellogg, recalled visiting Bozarth "ten or twelve years" after the murder and "she showed the scalp lock still retaining the long black hair. It was the only thing of that kind I had ever seen and I remember it caused cold chills to run over me." After Bozarth died in 1876, Ebey's scalp was passed on to his niece, Almira Enos. The next mention of its location occurred in 1892 when Almira visited Whidbey, an event noted by the Island County Times. In the newspaper's July 29, 1892 issue it was reported:

Mrs. Enos visited the Times office. She was a resident of the Island ... when her uncle was killed and can relate things connected with that tragic affair as though it was but a recent incident.

But Enos also visited an old friend, Hugh Crockett, who was quoted by the Times as saying that Enos "told me only a few weeks ago that she has (the scalp) at her house in San Francisco." Those two articles are the most reliable accounts to date of where that "sad memento" of Ebey's death was kept. At this time only one other reference to the scalp's whereabouts has been found. According to family reports, the scalp was last known to be in the possession of the Almira Enos family in California as of 1914.

== Legacy ==
The area around Isaac Ebey's original homestead is today a living memorial to his pioneer legacy. Fort Ebey (established in 1942) on the west side of the central part of the island (just northwest of Coupeville) is named in his honor. The rich farmland claimed by Isaac and his father Jacob is still called Ebey's Prairie and is farmed to this day.

Ebey's Landing, while no longer a docking port, is named for the beachfront located just below the still-standing Ferry House built in 1860. The Landing is now a National Historical Reserve and was the first NHR in the United States. External views of the Ferry House and the surrounding Ebey's Prairie can be seen in scenes from the 1999 movie Snow Falling On Cedars, depicting the homestead of fictional German immigrant, Carl Heine, Sr.

== See also ==
- History of Olympia
- Port Gamble, Washington
- Ebey's Landing National Historical Reserve
