= Admiralty Inlet Natural Area Preserve =

Protected area in Washington, United States

Coordinates: 48.19176°N 122.70795°W

Admiralty Inlet Natural Area Preserve in Island County, Washington is part of the Washington Natural Areas Program. It lies along Admiralty Inlet within Ebey's Landing National Historical Reserve on land owned by the Whidbey Camano Land Trust with a conservation easement owned by the Washington Department of Natural Resources. Admiralty Inlet NAP is home to one of only 11 remaining populations of golden paintbrush, a flowering plant listed as threatened under the Endangered Species Act. The preserve's 46 acres (19 ha) includes old-growth forest, a rare remnant prairie, and shoreline.

The Whidbey Camano Land Trust purchased the site from Seattle Pacific University for $3.3 million in June 2013.
