= Fort Ebey State Park =

State park in the U.S. state of Washington

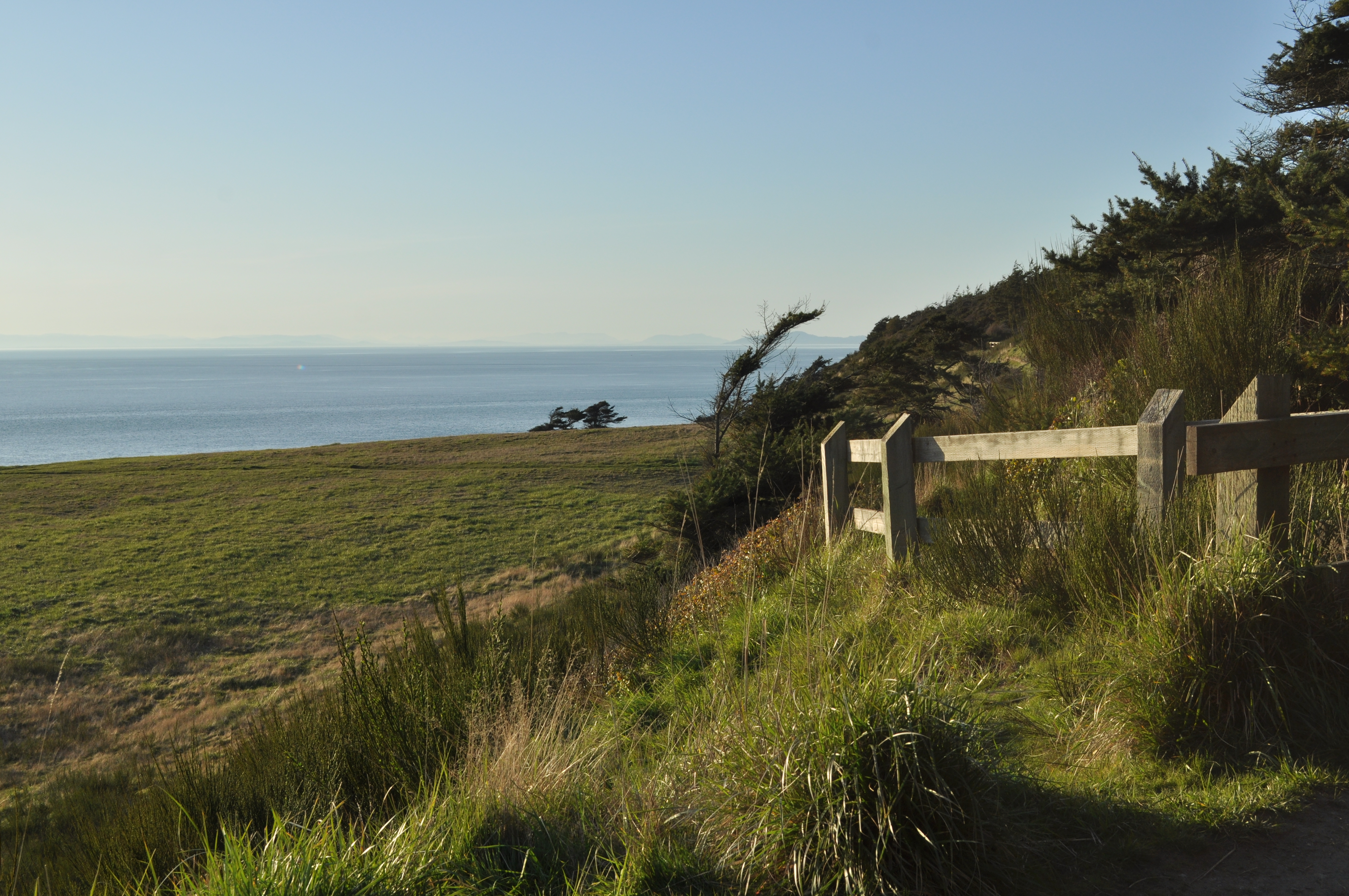

- Location within Washington (state) Location within the United States
- Location: Island County, Washington, United States
- Coordinates: 48°13′29″N 122°46′13″W
- Area: 651 acres (263 ha)
- Elevation: 7 ft (2.1 m)
- Established: 1965
- Administrator: Washington State Parks and Recreation Commission
- Website: Official website

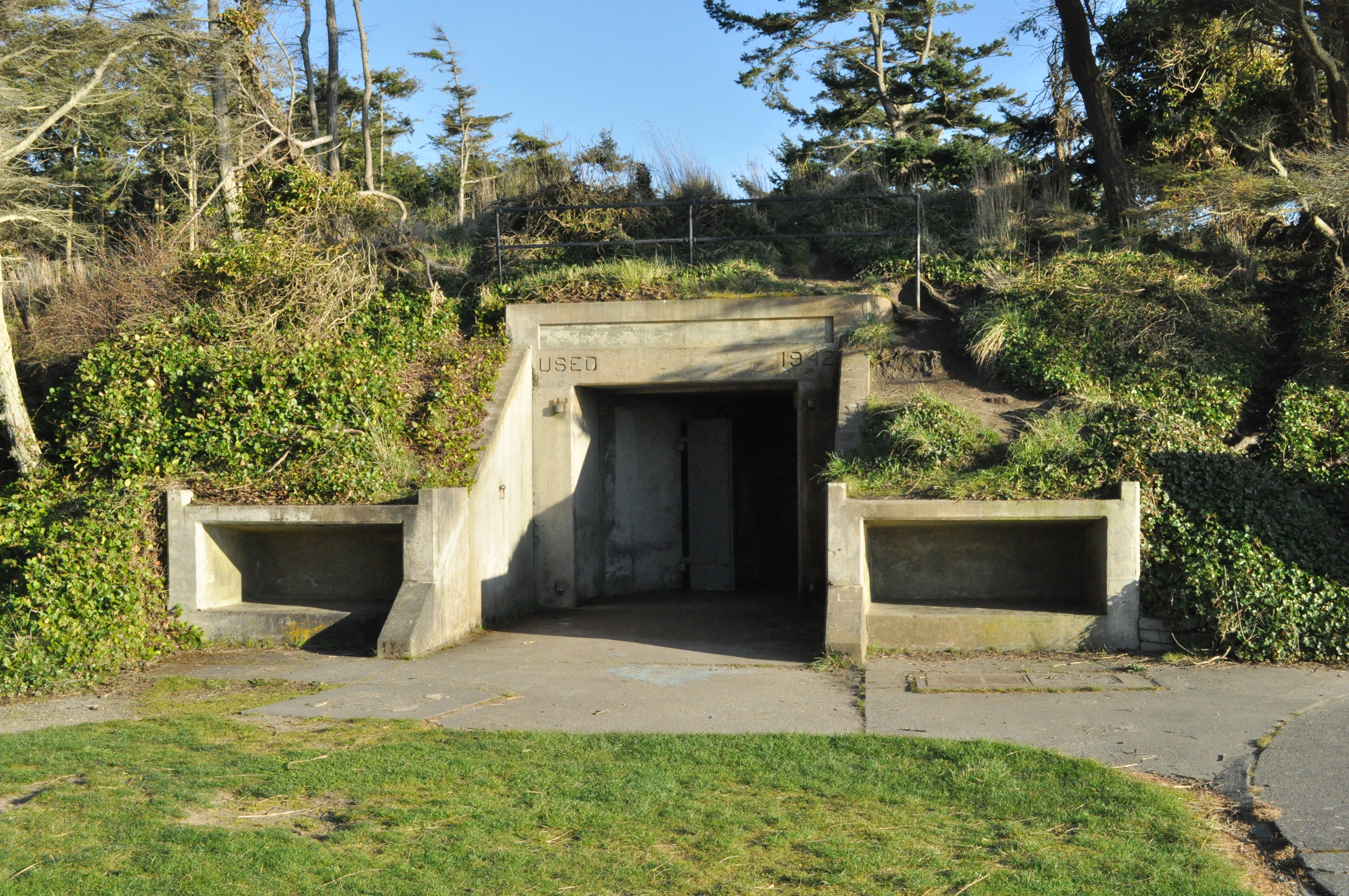
Entrance to 6-inch gun bunker at Fort Ebey

Fort Ebey State Park is a public recreation area occupying the site of former Fort Ebey on the west side of Whidbey Island, five miles (8.0 km) west of Coupeville in Island County, Washington, United States. The state park covers 651 acres (263 ha) overlooking the Strait of Juan de Fuca and lies within the Ebey's Landing National Historical Reserve. It is managed by the Washington State Parks and Recreation Commission.

== History ==
Fort Ebey was built on Partridge Point in 1942 as a World War II coastal defense near the mouth of Puget Sound. The fort was named for Isaac Neff Ebey, a pioneering homesteader on Whidbey Island. The fort included a battery of two 6-inch guns that were later cut up for scrap.

The state first acquired the land through the purchase of 204 acres from the federal government in 1965. Additional acquisitions were made between 1968 and 1974, adding nearly 24 acres to the site. The park was further increased through a purchase from the Department of Natural Resources and a land swap arrangement with a private owner in 1990 and 1997. The park opened in 1981.

== Activities and amenities ==
The park includes 3 miles (4.8 km) of saltwater shoreline, the 3.7-acre (1.5 ha) freshwater Lake Pondilla, and 25 miles of trails. A four-mile (6.4 km) stretch of the Pacific Northwest National Scenic Trail crosses the park. Park activities include picnicking, camping, fishing, beachcombing, and paragliding.

== See also ==
- United States home front during World War II
