= Deception Pass Bridge =

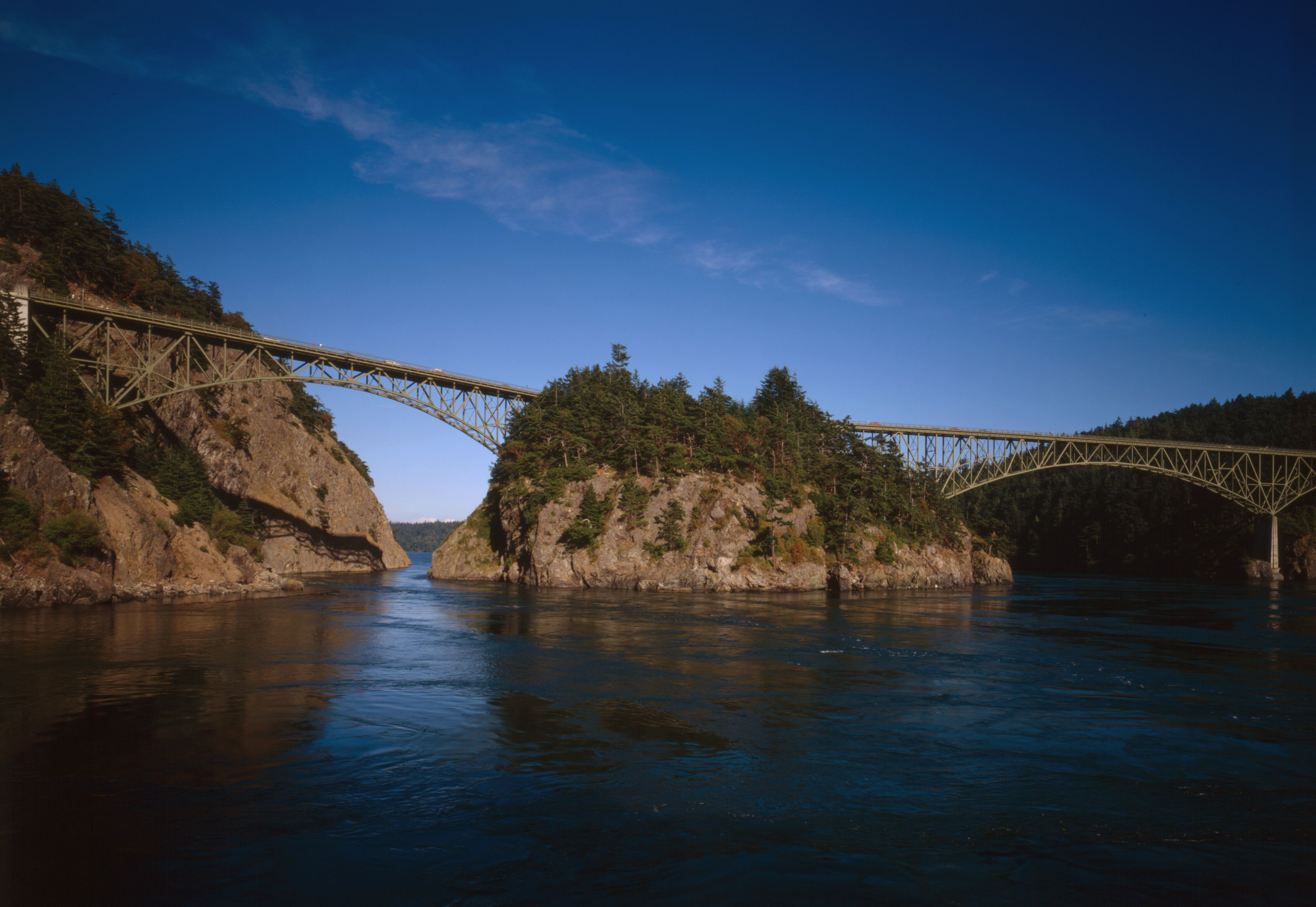
- Both Canoe Pass and Deception Pass Bridges, looking east
- Coordinates: 48°24′22″N 122°38′42″W
- Carries: SR 20
- Crosses: Deception Pass, Canoe Pass
- Locale: Oak Harbor, Washington
- Heritage status: NRHP

Characteristics
- Design: Deck arch, cantilever
- Material: Steel
- Total length: 1,487 feet (453 m)
- Width: 28 feet (8.5 m)
- Longest span: 511 feet (156 m)
- Clearance below: 180 feet (55 m)

History
- Construction start: August 1934
- Inaugurated: July 1935

Statistics
- Daily traffic: 20,000 cars
- Deception Pass Bridge
- U.S. National Register of Historic Places
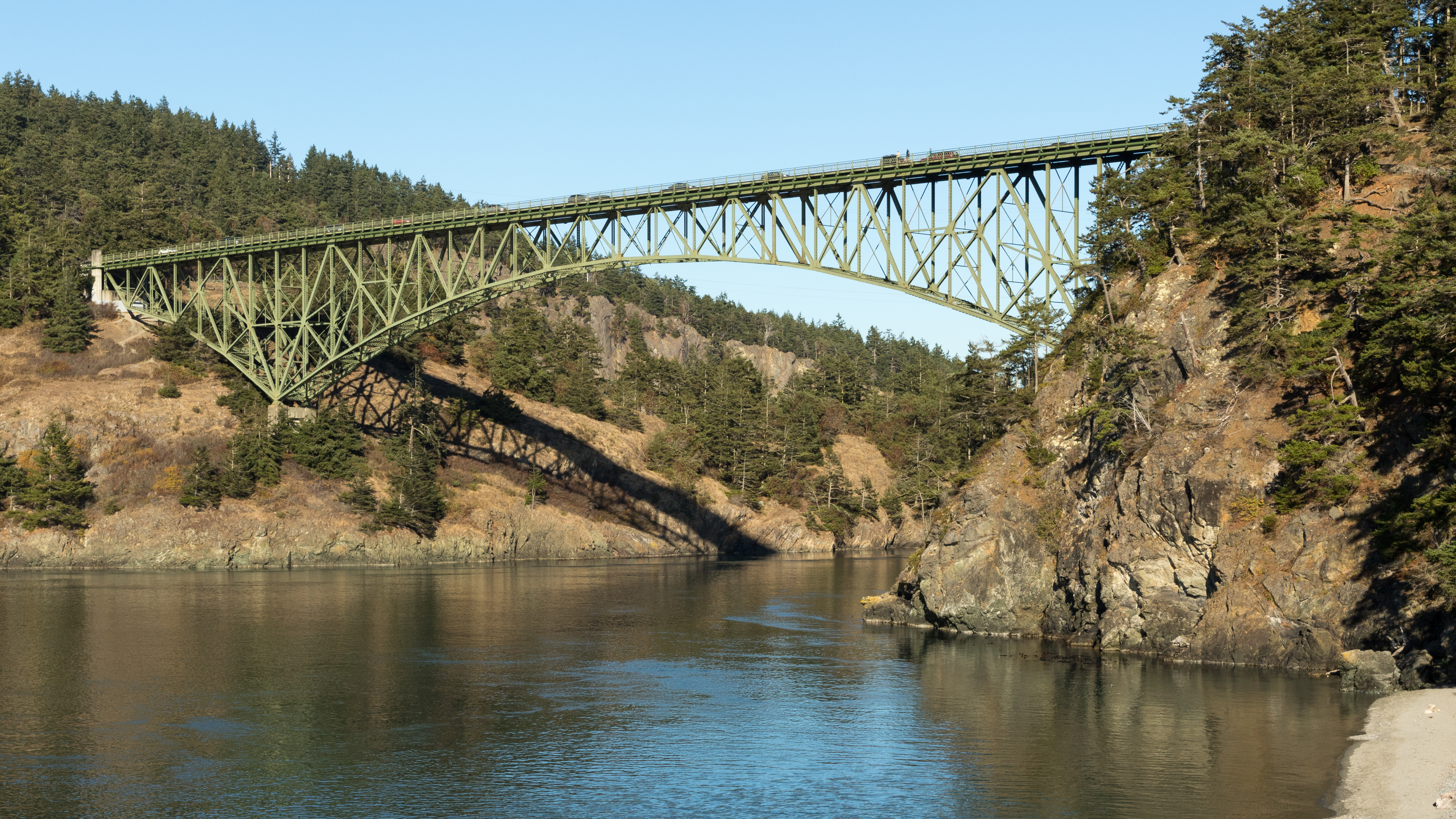
- Deception Pass Bridge, connecting Whidbey Island to Pass Island.
- Location: Island and Skagit counties, Washington
- Nearest city: Oak Harbor; Anacortes
- MPS: Historic Bridges/Tunnels in Washington State TR
- NRHP reference No.: 82004285
- Added to NRHP: July 16, 1982

Location
- Interactive map of Deception Pass Bridge

Deception Pass Bridge is the common name for two two-lane bridges on Washington State Route 20 connecting Whidbey Island in Island County, to Fidalgo Island in Skagit County, in the U.S. state of Washington. It was a Washington State Highways project, and included project elements built by young workers from the Civilian Conservation Corps. Completion of the bridge was a factor in the decision to build Naval Air Station Whidbey Island and helped Oak Harbor flourish. The bridge is a commonly photographed landmark of the Puget Sound region.

== History ==
In the spring of 1792, Joseph Whidbey, master of HMS Discovery and Captain Vancouver's chief navigator proved that Deception Pass was not really a small bay as charted by the Spaniards (hence the name "Deception"), but a deep and turbulent channel that connects the Strait of Juan de Fuca with the Saratoga Passage, which separates the mainland from what they believed was a peninsula (actually Fidalgo Island and Whidbey Island). Thomas Coupe, a sea captain and founder of Coupeville, was the only man ever to sail a full-rigged ship through the strait discovered by Whidbey.

In the early years of the 20th century, travelers of the horse-and-buggy era used an unscheduled ferry to cross from Fidalgo Island to Whidbey Island. To call the ferry, they banged a saw with a mallet and then sat back to wait.

The bridge, one of the scenic wonders of the Pacific Northwest, is actually two spans, one over Canoe Pass to the north, and another over Deception Pass to the south. Pass Island lies between the two bridges. Construction began in August 1934, and the completed bridge was dedicated at noon on July 31, 1935. The Wallace Bridge and Structural Co. of Seattle, Washington provided 460 tons of steel for the 511-foot (156 m) Canoe Pass arch and 1130 tons for the 976-foot (297 m) Deception Pass span. The cost of the New Deal-era construction was $482,000, made possible through the Public Works Administration and county funds.

In 1982, the bridge was listed in the National Register of Historic Places ahead of a repainting project that cost more than the original construction cost. A second repainting was completed in 1997. A third repainting project began in May 2019; though initially expected to be completed in late 2021 at a cost of $22.6 million, the project ultimately wrapped with a final cost of $24 million. The bridge retained its current color, named 'Evergreen Green', using lead-free paint; the project also included replacement of steel pieces that have signs of corrosion.

Deception Pass Bridge was the inspiration for the under-bridge sequence in the 2004 video game Half-Life 2, in the chapter "Highway 17".

== Bridge facts ==
- Height from water to roadway: about 180 feet (55 m), depending on the tide
- Roadway: two 11-foot (3.4 m) lanes, one in each direction
- Sidewalks: 3-foot-wide (0.91 m) sidewalk on each side
- Width of bridge deck: 28 feet (8.5 m)
- Total length: 1,487 feet (453 m) (more than a quarter mile)
- Canoe Pass: one 350-foot (110 m) arch and three concrete T-beam approach spans
- Deception Pass: two 175-foot (53 m) cantilever spans, one 200-foot (61 m) suspended span, and four concrete T-beam approach spans
- Vehicle crossings: 20,000 per day on average
- Maximum speed of current in Deception Pass at flood/ebb tide: 9 kts
- Maximum speed of current in Canoe Pass at flood/ebb tide: 10 kts
- 12 total suicides by jumping from the bridge in 2009 and 15 in 2010
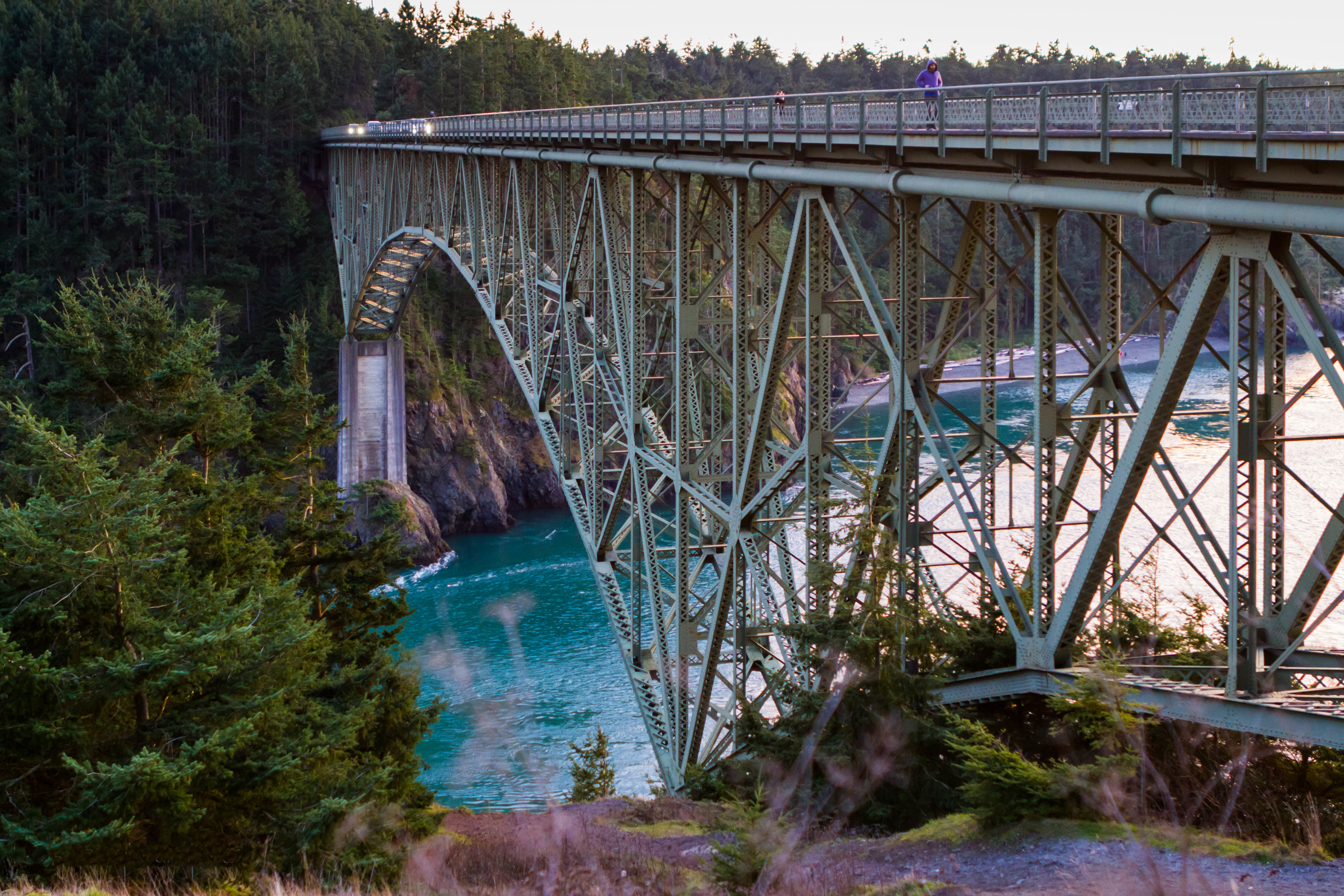
A view of the east side of the bridge

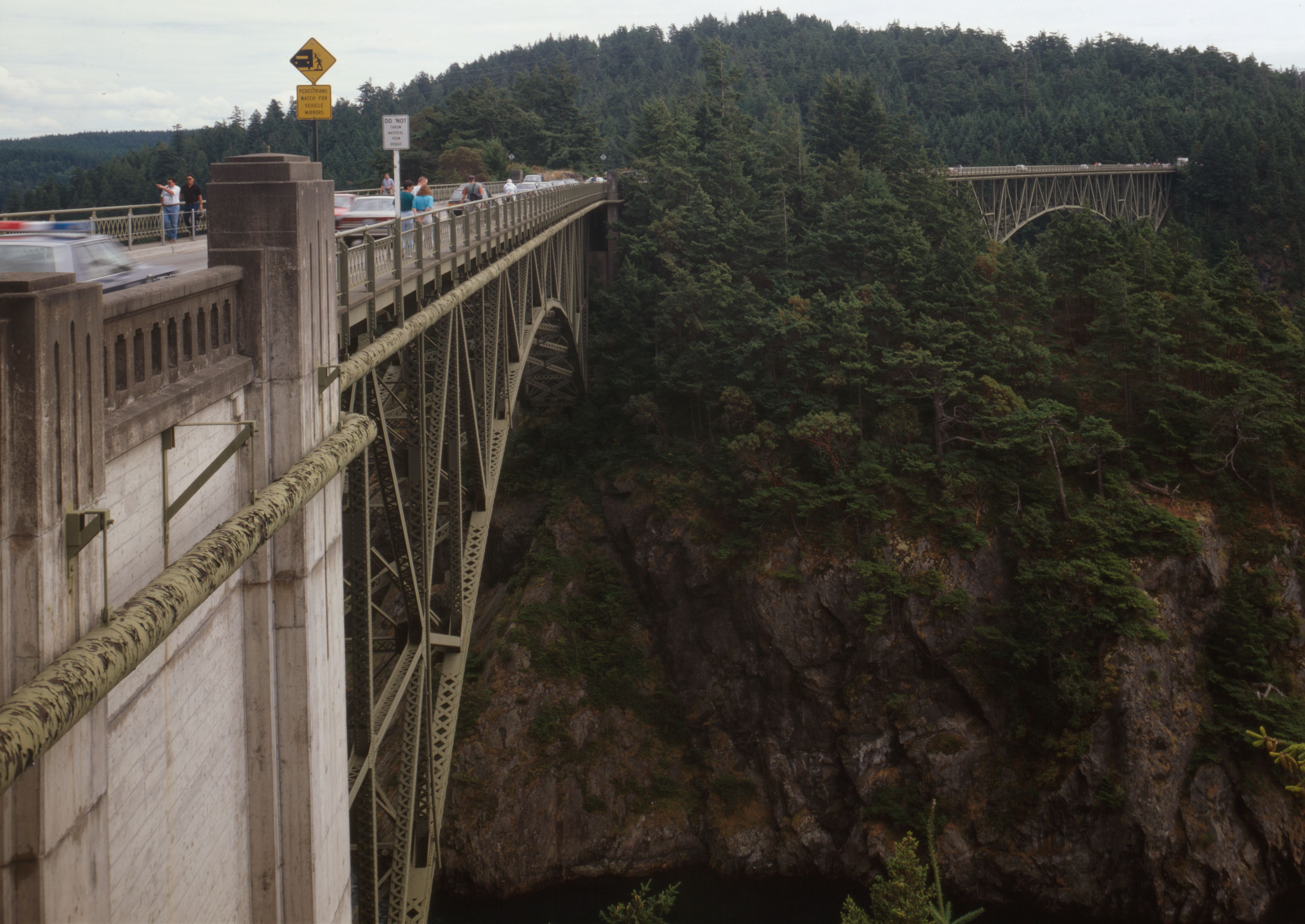
Looking south towards Canoe pass (foreground) and Deception pass

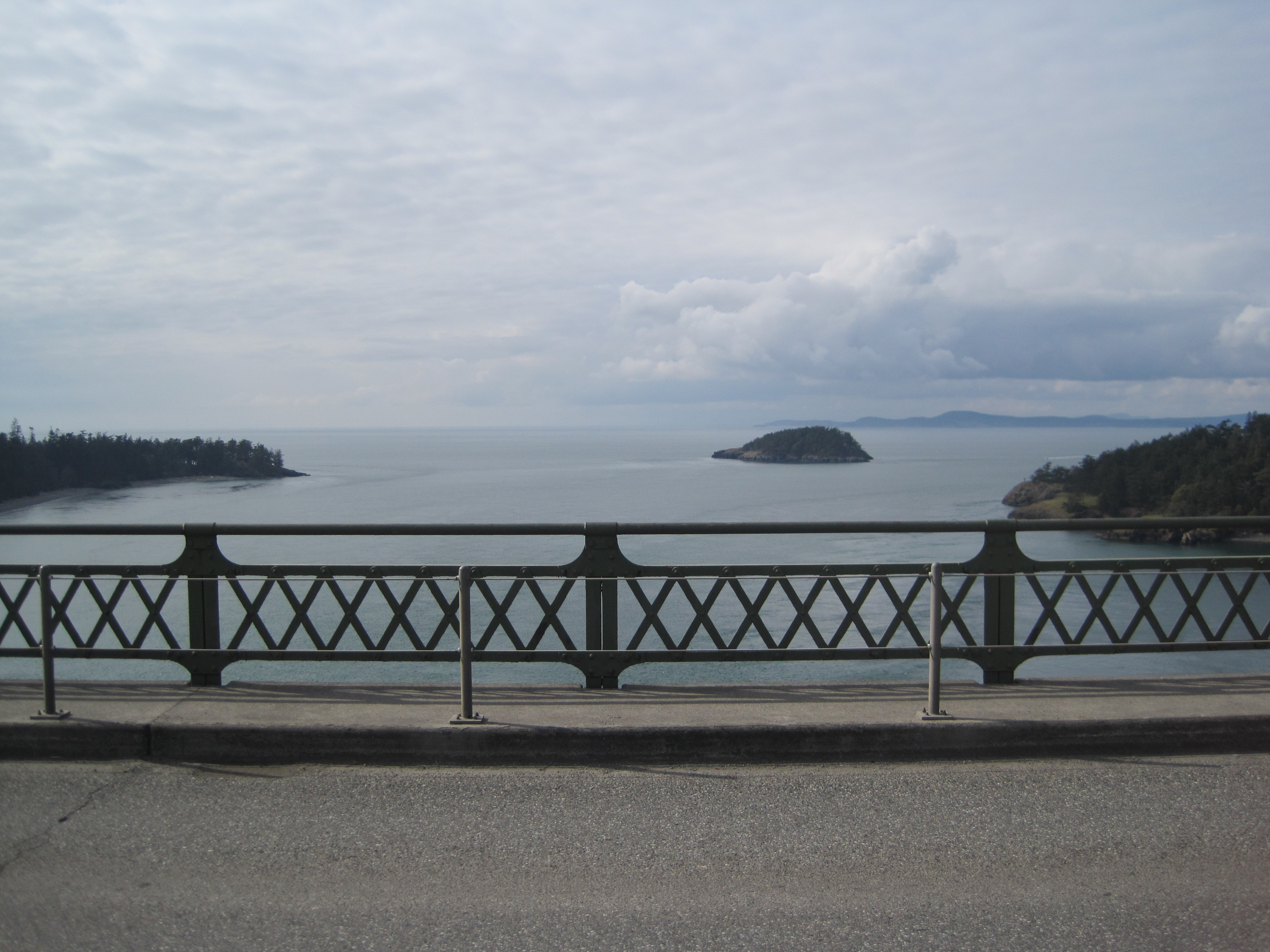
Looking west towards Deception Pass strait from the top of the bridge

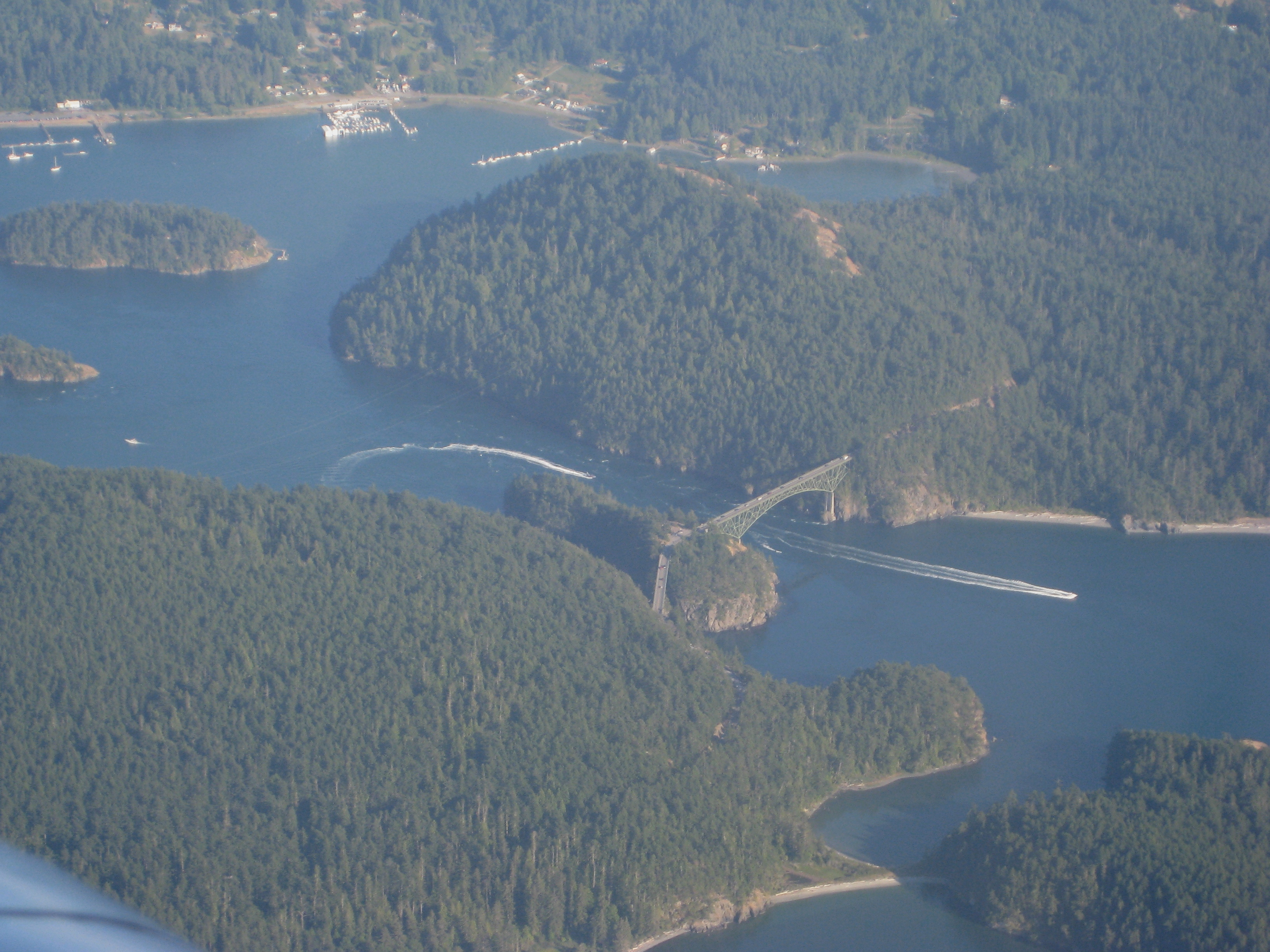
Aerial view of the bridge

== See also ==
- List of bridges documented by the Historic American Engineering Record in Washington (state)
