= Robert Dykstra =

American historian

Robert R. Dykstra (1930 - November 10, 2022) was an American historian. He was professor emeritus of history and public policy at the State University of New York at Albany. He was a fellow of the Society of American Historians. In 1986, he and Jo Ann Manfra received the Binkley-Stephenson Award of the Organization of American Historians for the best article of the year in The Journal of American History.

== Books ==
- The Cattle Towns (1968)
- Bright Radical Star: Black Freedom and White Supremacy on the Hawkeye Frontier (1993)
- with Jo Ann Manfra Dodge City and the Birth of the Wild West (2017)
