= Thomas Coupe =

Canadian ship's captain (c.1818–1875)

- Born: c. 1818; New Brunswick, Canada
- Died: December 27, 1875; Whidbey Island, Washington
- Occupation: Ship's Captain
- Known for: Captain of several sailing ships, early settler of Whidbey island

Captain Thomas Coupe (c. 1818 – December 27, 1875) was a ship's captain and early settler of Whidbey Island.

Thomas Coupe was born in New Brunswick, Canada and began going to sea at the age of 12. Coupe sailed the North American Atlantic Coast until the early 1850s. Coupe sailed to the Puget Sound area in 1852 on the sailing vessel Success, a ship in which he was half owner.

Under the Donation Land Claim Act, Coupe established a 320-acre claim in the central part of Whidbey Island upon which the present town of Coupeville now stands.

He is the only captain known to have sailed a square-rigged ship through Deception Pass. The town of Coupeville was named after him; there, he built a house in 1854, from Californian redwood.

Coupe was also the sailing master on the Jefferson Davis, the first revenue cutter on Puget Sound. Coupe retired to his farm on Whidbey Island, remaining there until his death in 1875. He is buried in the Sunnyside Cemetery in the central Whidbey Island area.

Coupe had sons, Thomas Coupe and George M. Coupe.
