= USS Massachusetts (1845) =

American steamship

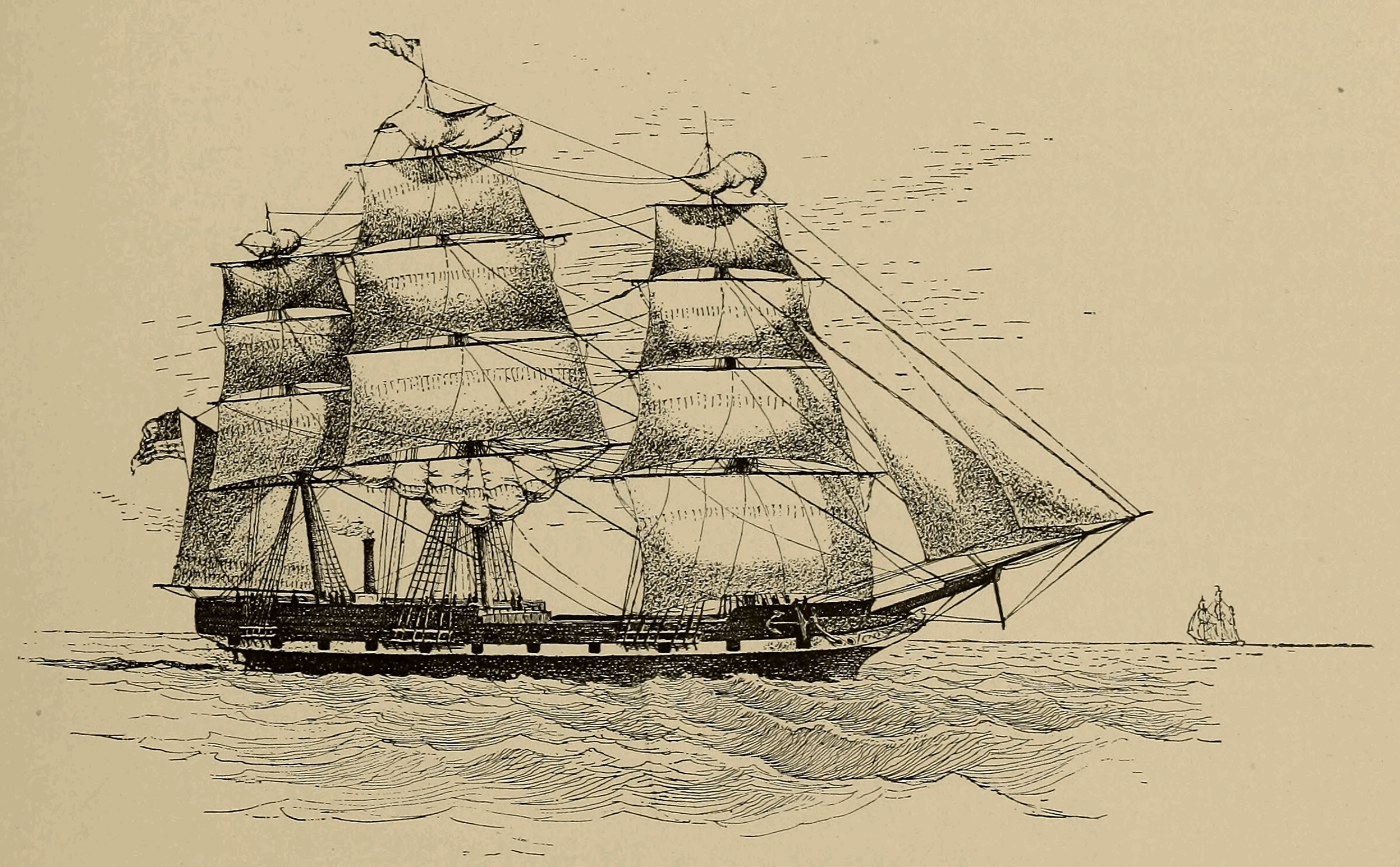
- This illustration of USS Massachusetts appeared in Cassier's Magazine, December 1894.

History

United States
- Launched: 1845
- Acquired: August 1, 1849
- Commissioned: August 1, 1849
- Decommissioned: May 1859
- In service: June 17, 1863
- Out of service: February 1867
- Fate: sold, May 15, 1867

General characteristics
- Tonnage: 765
- Length: 178 ft (54 m)
- Beam: 32 ft 2 in (9.80 m)
- Draft: 15 ft (4.6 m)
- Propulsion: steam engine; screw-propelled
- Armament: 4 guns

USS Massachusetts was a steamer built in 1845 and acquired by the U.S. War Department in 1847. She was used by the U.S. Army as a transport during the Mexican–American War before being transferred to U.S. Navy Department in 1849. She traveled widely, including transiting Cape Horn several times as part of her official duties on both sides of the Americas. During her years of service she spent most of her time on the west coast of North America.

== Construction/commercial use and first Army service ==
Massachusetts, was a wooden steamer, was built in the shipyard of Samuel Hall, Boston, Massachusetts, under the supervision of Edward H. Delano for Mr. R. B. Forbes in 1845. As an auxiliary steam packet, she helped pioneer commercial steamer service between New York City and Liverpool, England. She was purchased by the War Department in 1847 and served during the Mexican–American War as a troop transport for the Army. In 1848, she steamed round Cape Horn to San Francisco, California, possibly transporting some members and intended for the use of a Joint Commission of Navy and Army Officers (Joint Commission-also called the "Joint Board of Army and Navy Officers" and "Joint Board of Engineers and Naval Officers") who were assigned to explore the U.S. West Coast to identify potential sites for forts, lighthouses and buoys. The Joint Commission consisted of three army engineers: Maj. John L. Smith, Maj. Cornelius A. Ogden and 1st Lt. Danville Leadbetter; and three naval officers: Comdr. Louis M. Goldsborough, Comdr. G.J. Van Brunt, and Lt. Simon F. Blunt.

== Pacific Squadron ==
Massachusetts was transferred to the U.S. Navy Department at San Francisco Bay, August 1, 1849; and commissioned the same day, Lt. Sam. R. Knox in command. She was assigned to the Pacific Squadron and was detailed for use by the Joint Commission. Due to the inability to hire crew members, Massachusetts along with the U.S. Survey schooner Ewing, under the command of William Pope McArthur sailed to Hawaii for the winter of 1849–50 to acquire crew members from King Kamehameha III. When they returned in March 1850, the Joint Commission made its preliminary recommendations to president Millard Fillmore as to reservations of islands and lands around San Francisco Bay, then they and the Massachusetts sailed up to Puget Sound. After a cursory examination of the mouth of the Columbia River, the ship and the Joint Commission returned to California in July 1850. After a trip to San Diego, the Joint Commission made its final recommendation on November 30, 1850, by which time the Massachusetts either had begun regular Navy duties, or was transporting other personnel surveying the west coast.

She departed San Francisco for the east coast August 12, 1852; steamed via ports in Ecuador, Chile, and Brazil; and arrived Norfolk, Virginia, March 17, 1853. She decommissioned the following day.

== South America ==
Massachusetts was recommissioned at Norfolk on May 2, 1854, with Lt. Richard W. Meade in command. After fitting out, she departed for the Pacific Ocean on July 5, reached the Straits of Magellan on December 13, and arrived at the Mare Island Navy Yard, on May 8, 1855. During June and July, she cruised the coast between San Francisco and the Columbia River; thence, she sailed for Central America on August 25. She showed the flag from Mexico to Nicaragua and returned to San Francisco January 9, 1856.

== Puget Sound ==
=== Battle of Port Gamble ===
Massachusetts departed Mare Island on February 17, 1856, with guns and ammunition for Seattle, Washington, where she arrived on February 24. She operated in Puget Sound and the Strait of Juan de Fuca for more than a year, visiting ports in Washington Territory and the British Crown Colony of Vancouver Island. The Massachusetts was sent from there to Port Gamble, Washington Territory on Puget Sound, where raiding parties from the indigenous Tlingit nation located in British and Russian territories had been attacking the local Coast Salish Native Americans. When the warriors refused to hand over those among them who had attacked the Puget Sound Native American communities, USS Massachusetts landed a shore party, and a battle ensued in which 26 natives and one sailor were killed. In the aftermath of this, Colonel Isaac Ebey, the first settler on Whidbey Island, was shot and beheaded on August 11, 1857, by a raiding party in revenge for the killing of a native chief during similar raids the year before. British authorities demurred on pursuing or attacking the northern tribes as they passed northward through British waters off Victoria and Ebey's killers were never caught.

She departed the Pacific Northwest on April 4, 1857, reached Mare Island on April 9, and decommissioned there on June 17.

== Army service ==
On January 5, 1859 Secretary of the Navy Isaac Toucey ordered the Commandant of the Mare Island Navy Yard to fit out Massachusetts prior to transfer back to the War Department. She was turned over to the Army Quartermaster Corps in May 1859 and during the next few years cruised Puget Sound "for the protection of the inhabitants of that quarter", which was going through rapid change and an influx of miners and settlers as a consequence of the Fraser Gold Rush and successive rushes just to the north in the Colony of British Columbia, and also as part of US military force assembled in the area during the period of confrontation with the Royal Navy and Royal Marines known as the Pig War, a bloodless though tense dispute over the boundary through the San Juan Islands. The Quartermaster General of the Army ordered Massachusetts re-transferred to the Navy January 27, 1862. Subsequently, she was placed in ordinary at Mare Island and surveyed.

== Renamed Farallones ==
Massachusetts underwent conversion to a storeship. Her engines were removed, and she was converted into a bark. Renamed Farallones in January 1863, she commissioned on June 17, 1863, Acting Master C. C. Wells in command. She served ships of the Pacific Squadron as a storeship until February 1867 when she decommissioned at Mare Island. She was sold at San Francisco to Moore & Co. on May 15, 1867.
