= Ebey's Landing National Historical Reserve =

- IUCN category V (protected landscape/seascape)
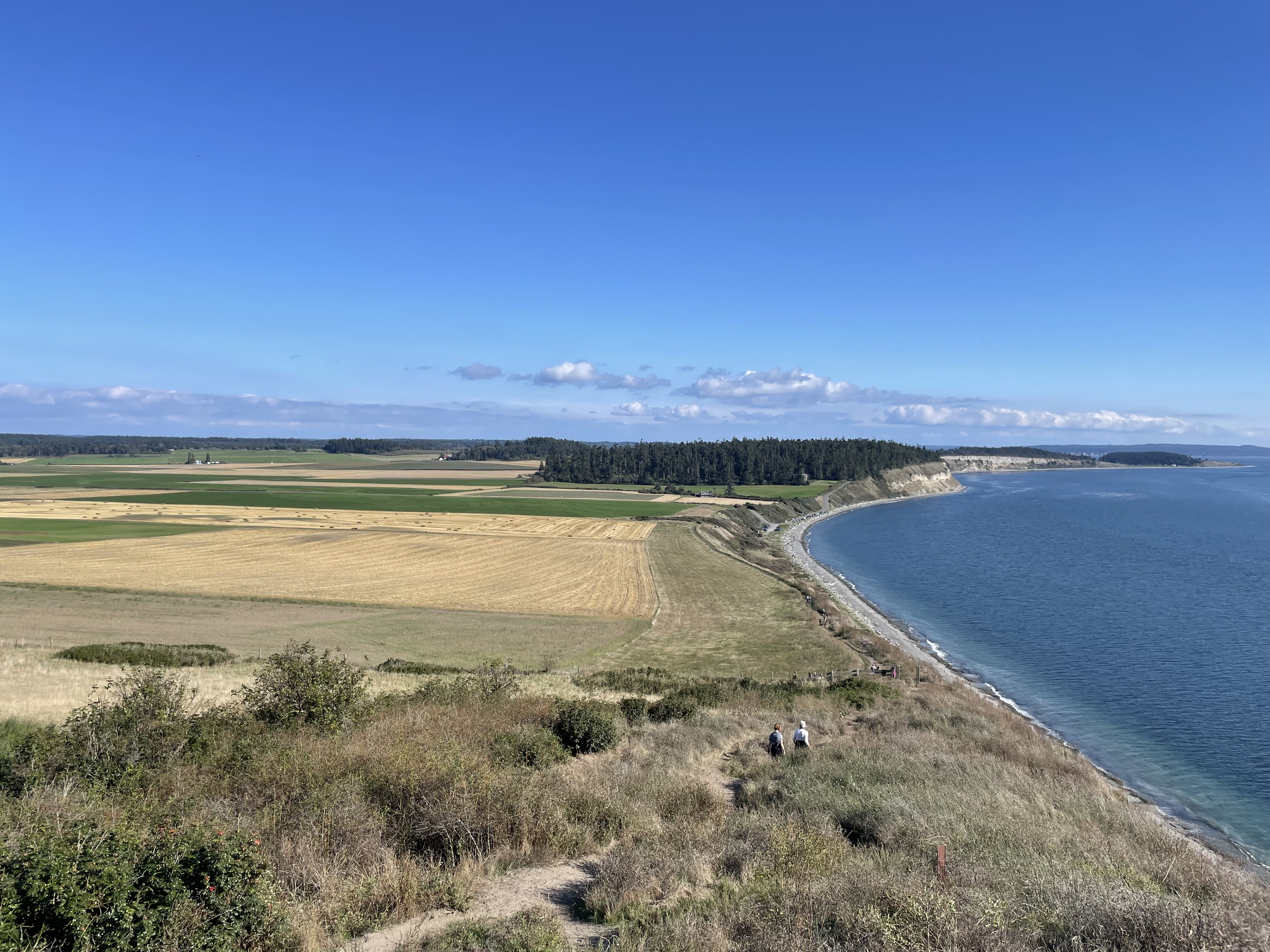
- Bluffs and Fields at Ebey's Landing

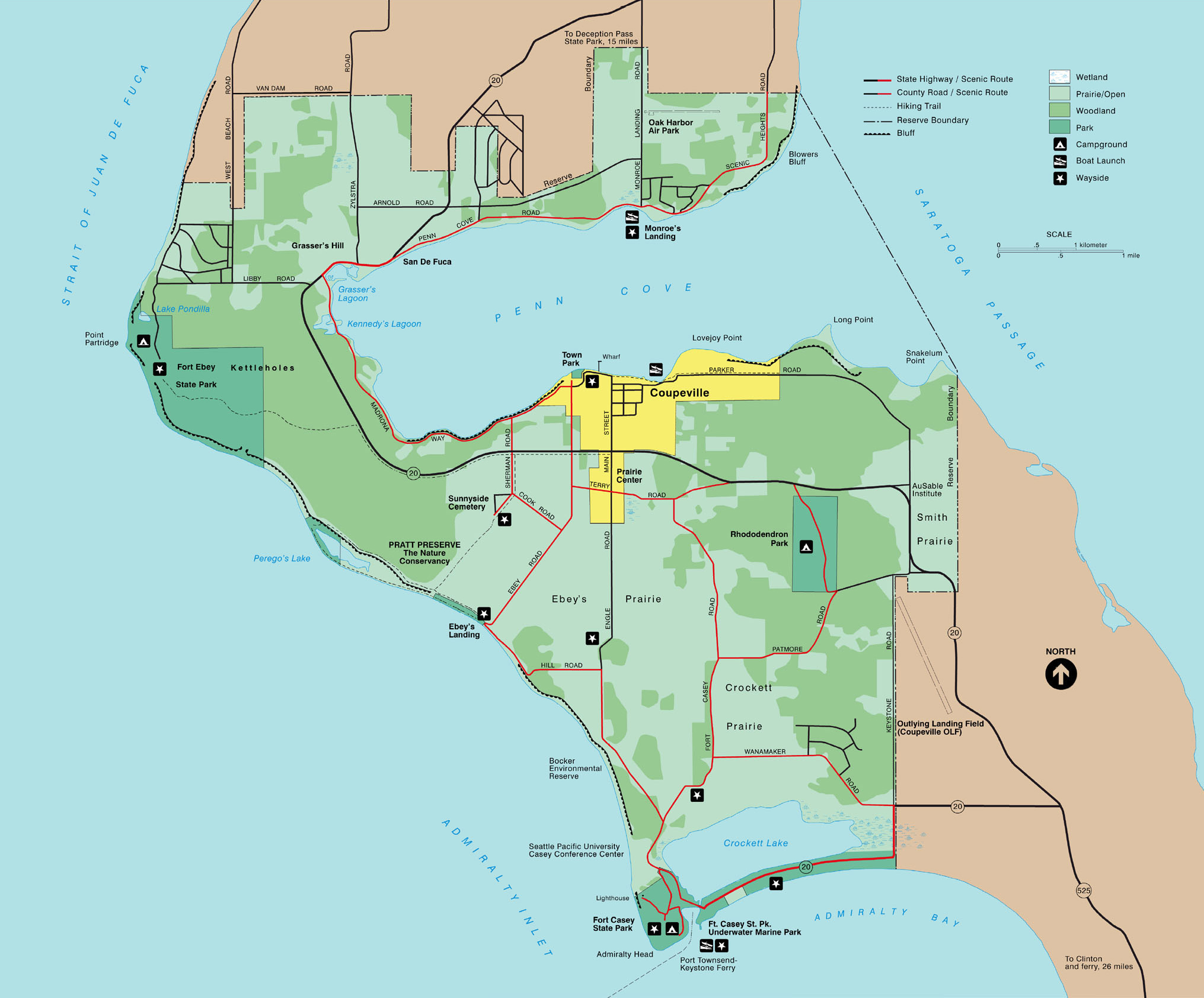
- Map of sites in the reserve.
- Location: Island County, Washington, US
- Nearest city: Coupeville, Washington
- Coordinates: 48°13′6″N 122°41′1″W
- Area: 19,333 acres (78.24 km^{2})
- Established: November 10, 1978
- Governing body: National Park Service
- Website: Ebey's Landing National Historical Reserve

- Ebey's Landing National Historical Reserve
- U.S. National Register of Historic Places
- Location within Washington (state)
- NRHP reference No.: 01000229
- Added to NRHP: November 10, 1978

- Central Whidbey Island Historic District
- U.S. National Register of Historic Places
- Location within Washington (state)
- NRHP reference No.: 73001869
- Added to NRHP: December 12, 1973

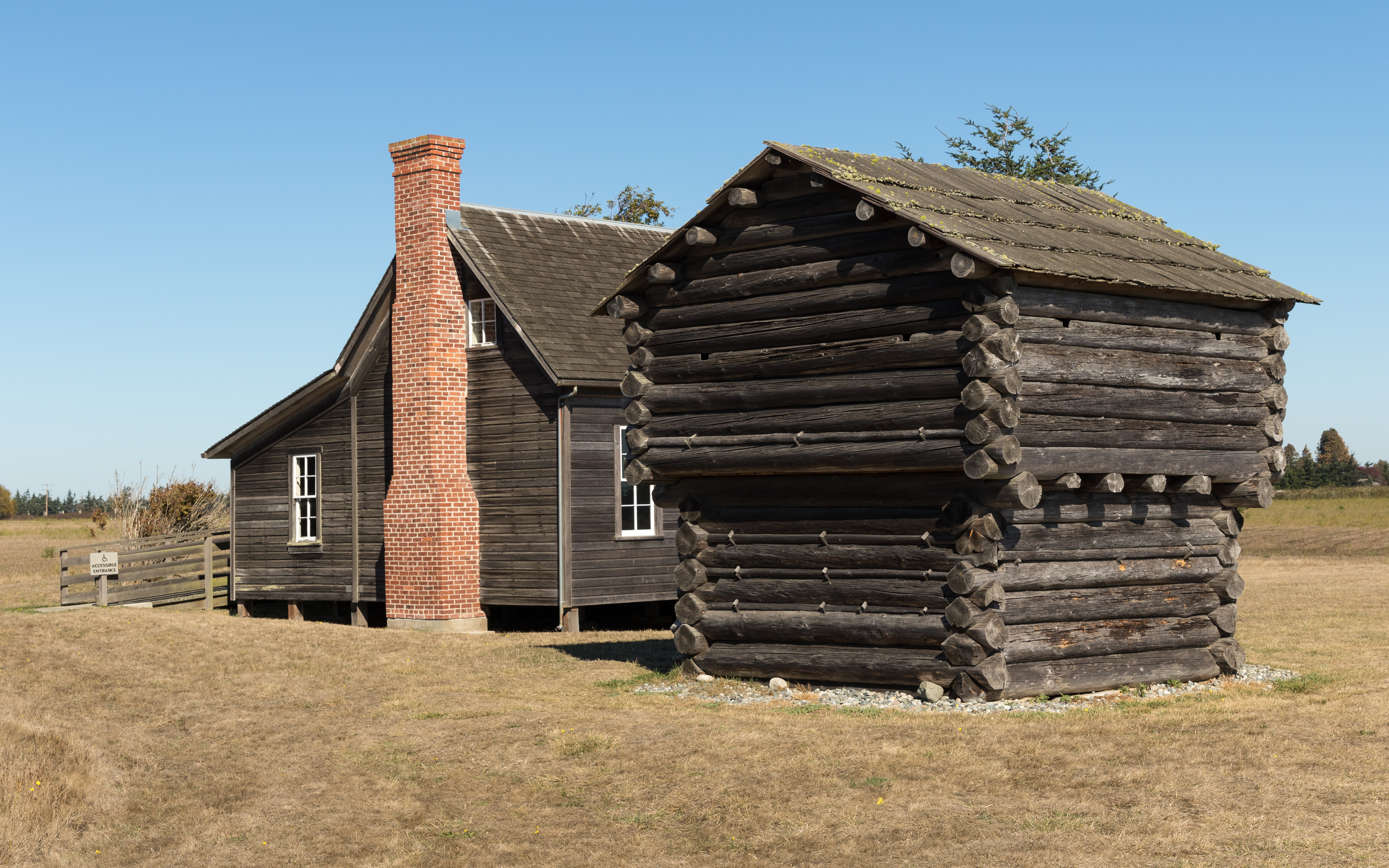
Jacob & Sarah Ebey House and Blockhouse

Ebey's Landing National Historical Reserve is a unit of the National Park Service on Whidbey Island in the Puget Sound, near Coupeville in Island County, Washington, United States.

== Description ==
The Ebey's Landing National Historical Reserve is a rural historic district that preserves and protects the historical record of Puget Sound exploration and settlement from the 19th century to the present. Historic farms, still under cultivation in the prairies of Whidbey Island, reveal land use patterns unchanged since settlers claimed the land in the 1850s under the Donation Land Claim Act. The nearby seaport community of Coupeville, one of the oldest towns in Washington, is included in the reserve.

Also included are both Fort Casey State Park and Fort Ebey State Park, as well as a section of the Pacific Northwest National Scenic Trail. The Central Whidbey Island Historic District, with the Sergeant Clark House and the Coupeville grain wharf, is part of the National Historical Reserve and is listed on the National Register of Historic Places. Other protected lands within the reserve include the Admiralty Inlet Natural Area Preserve.

=== History ===
The Reserve at Ebey's Landing provides a vivid historical record of Pacific Northwest history, including the first exploration of Puget Sound by Captain George Vancouver in 1792; early settlement by Colonel Isaac Ebey, who filed a claim under the Donation Land Claim Act in 1850; growth and settlement resulting from the Oregon Trail and the Westward migration; the Donation Land Laws (1850–1855); and the continued growth and settlement of the town of Coupeville.

=== Jurisdictions ===
Unlike many National Park Service units, the Ebey's Landing National Historical Reserve encompasses a mixture of federal, state, county, and private property. Authorized November 10, 1978, the reserve is a partnership managed by a local trust board. Limited federal facilities exist in the reserve, and only 209.06 acres (0.846 km²) of the reserve are federally owned.

== See also ==
- Battle of Port Gamble
- USS Massachusetts

== Sources ==
- Roberts, George; Roberts, Jan (1999). Discover historic Washington State. Baldwin Park, CA: Gem Guides Book Co. ISBN 1-889786-07-1.
- The National Parks: Index 2001–2003. Washington: U.S. Department of the Interior.
