= Coupeville, Washington =

Coupeville
- Town
- Coupeville, Washington
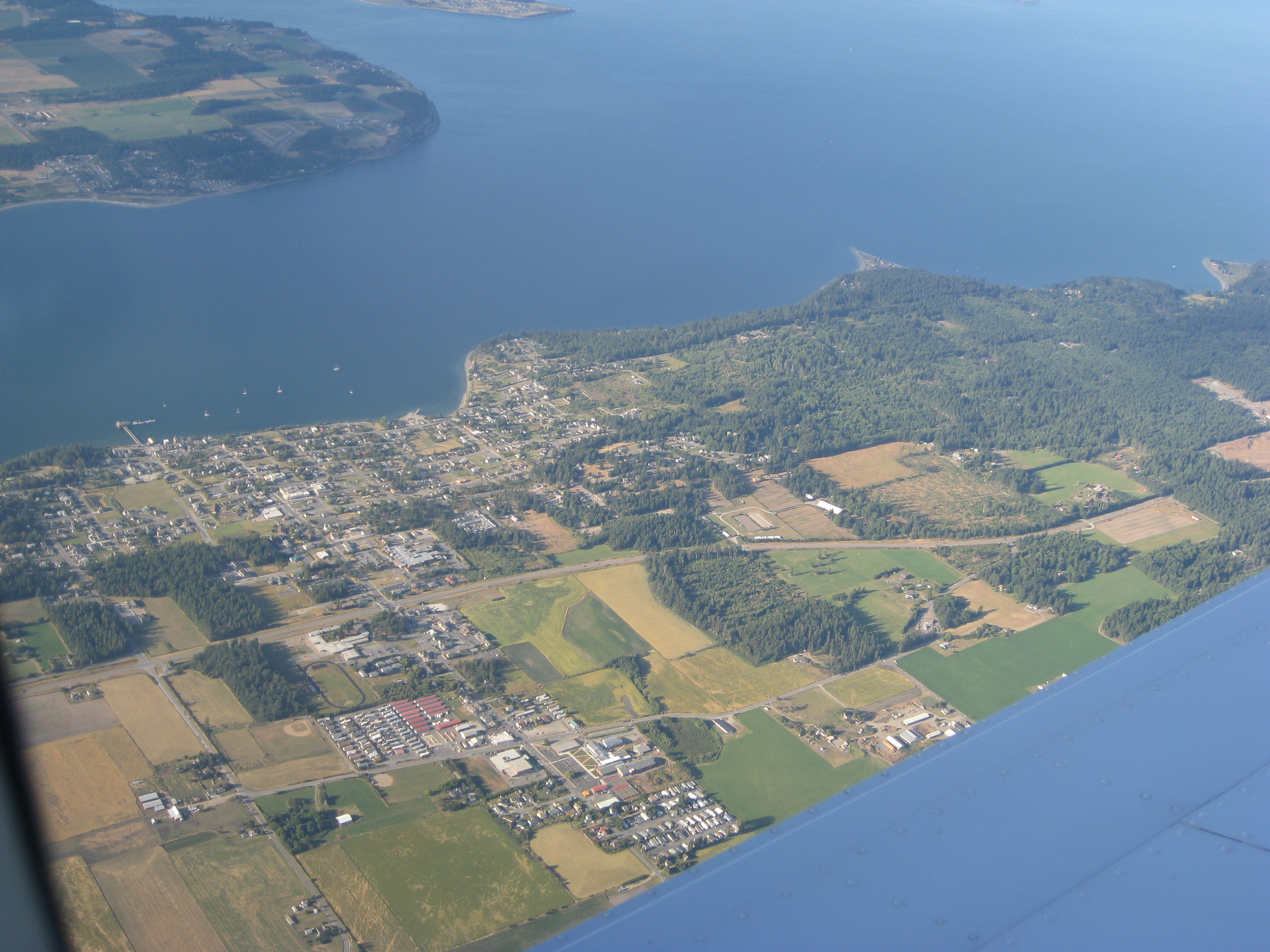
- Aerial view of Coupeville

- Location of Coupeville, Washington
- Coordinates: 48°13′09″N 122°40′44″W
- Country: United States
- State: Washington
- County: Island

Government
  - Type: Mayor–council
  - Mayor: Molly Hughes

Area
  - Total: 1.95 sq mi (5.04 km^{2})
  - Land: 1.27 sq mi (3.29 km^{2})
  - Water: 0.68 sq mi (1.75 km^{2})
- Elevation: 26 ft (7.9 m)

Population (2020)
  - Total: 1,942
  - Density: 1,530/sq mi (590/km^{2})
- Time zone: UTC−8 (Pacific (PST))
  - Summer (DST): UTC−7 (PDT)
- ZIP Code: 98239
- Area code(s): 360, 564
- FIPS code: 53-15185
- GNIS feature ID: 2412377
- Website: townofcoupeville.org

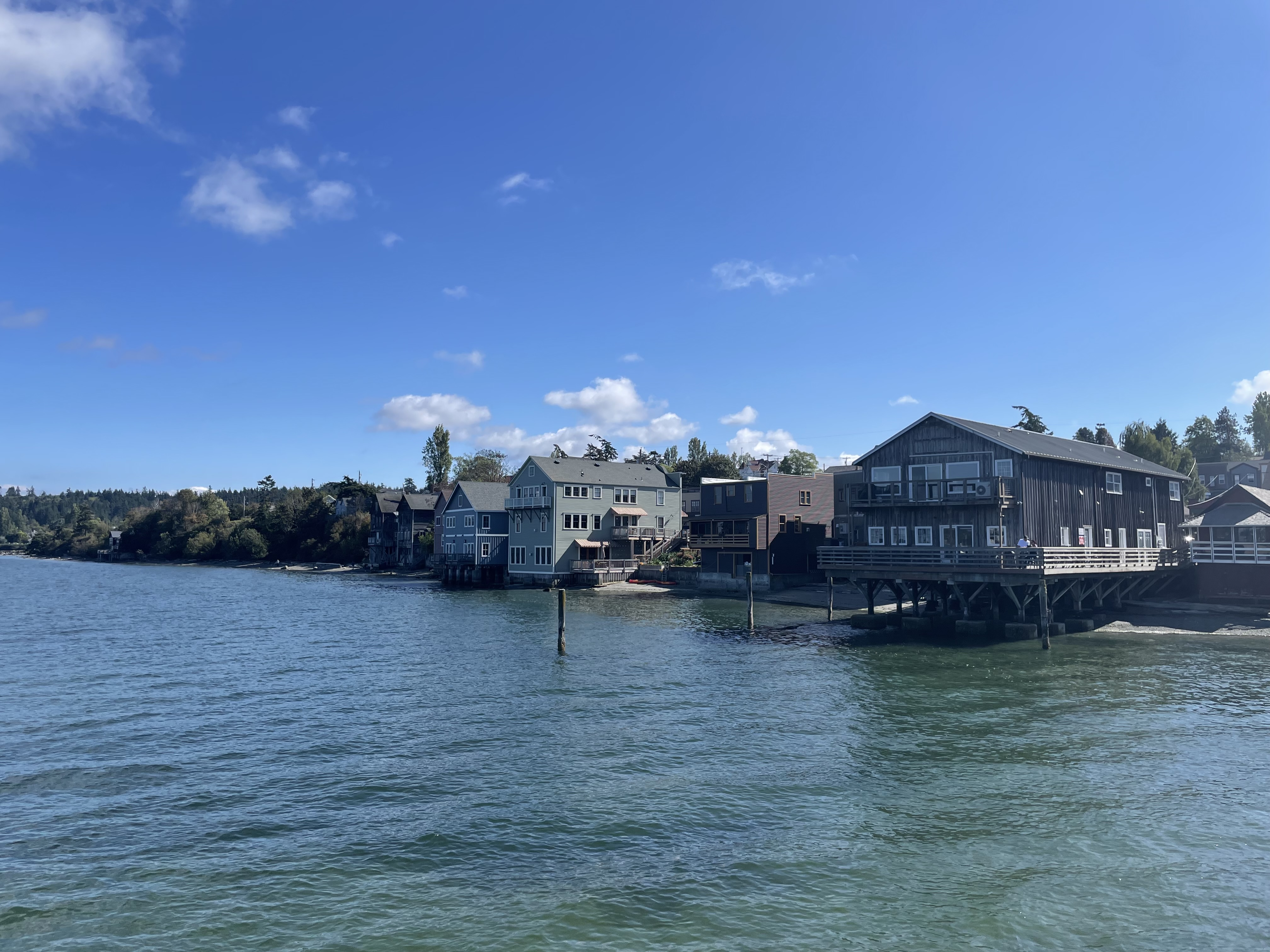
Coupeville Waterfront in 2024

Coupeville is a town on Whidbey Island, in Island County, Washington, United States.

It is the county seat of Island County. The population was 1,942 at the 2020 census.

== History ==
Prior to European settlement, Coupeville and the bay in which it is located, Penn Cove, was inhabited by the Lower Skagit, a Lushootseed-speaking Coast Salish people. There were three villages around the bay, with the largest being at bəc̓adᶻali, meaning "snake place", the site of present day Coupeville. There was an abundance of salmon, clams, and other resources, as well as offering easy access to the water, making it an excellent village site.

When Europeans arrived to explore the Puget Sound, it was Joseph Whidbey who first visited the bay, naming it Penn Cove in honor of his good friend. Captain George Vancouver later wrote after meeting the Skagit at the village that their population had quickly fallen due to disease.

Coupeville was laid out in the 1850s by Captain Thomas Coupe, and named for him.

Coupeville was officially incorporated on April 20, 1910.

Coupeville is a historic district within the federal Ebey's Landing National Historical Reserve. The reserve was established by Congress in 1978 as the first and only National Historical Reserve in the nation. Its 22 square miles (57 km^{2}) also encompass farmlands, Fort Ebey State Park, Fort Casey State Park, shorelines and beaches, parks, trails, and 91 buildings and structures on the National Register of Historic Places.

Coupeville was a film location for the 1998 movie Practical Magic.

== Geography ==
Coupeville is located near the center of Whidbey Island, which lies in Puget Sound between the mainland and the Olympic Peninsula. On the north side of downtown is Penn Cove, an inlet of the Saratoga Passage. The city is part of the Ebey's Landing National Historical Reserve, which also includes Fort Ebey State Park to the west.

According to the United States Census Bureau, the town has a total area of 1.23 square miles (3.19 km^{2}), all of it land.

== Climate ==
Coupeville experiences significantly lower rainfall than much of western Washington, due to its location within the rain shadow of the Olympic Mountains. Due to the significant drying trend in summer, Coupeville's climate is classified as warm-summer Mediterranean, according to the Köppen climate classification system.

Climate data for Coupeville 1S, Washington (1895 to 2016)
Month	Jan	Feb	Mar	Apr	May	Jun	Jul	Aug	Sep	Oct	Nov	Dec	Year
Record high °F (°C)	65 (18)	69 (21)	78 (26)	81 (27)	86 (30)	92 (33)	96 (36)	98 (37)	91 (33)	79 (26)	68 (20)	70 (21)	98 (37)
Mean daily maximum °F (°C)	44.4 (6.9)	48.1 (8.9)	51.9 (11.1)	57.3 (14.1)	62.7 (17.1)	67.2 (19.6)	71.7 (22.1)	72 (22)	67 (19)	58.3 (14.6)	49.9 (9.9)	45.5 (7.5)	58 (14)
Mean daily minimum °F (°C)	34.2 (1.2)	35.1 (1.7)	36.9 (2.7)	40.1 (4.5)	44.5 (6.9)	48.3 (9.1)	50.6 (10.3)	50.6 (10.3)	47.2 (8.4)	42.8 (6.0)	38.2 (3.4)	35.7 (2.1)	42 (6)
Record low °F (°C)	3 (−16)	5 (−15)	0 (−18)	25 (−4)	28 (−2)	35 (2)	40 (4)	38 (3)	29 (−2)	19 (−7)	6 (−14)	3 (−16)	0 (−18)
Average precipitation inches (mm)	2.36 (60)	1.73 (44)	1.84 (47)	1.57 (40)	1.56 (40)	1.26 (32)	0.74 (19)	0.85 (22)	1.28 (33)	1.77 (45)	2.56 (65)	2.69 (68)	20.22 (514)
Average snowfall inches (cm)	2.5 (6.4)	1.2 (3.0)	0.8 (2.0)	0 (0)	0 (0)	0 (0)	0 (0)	0 (0)	0 (0)	0 (0)	0.7 (1.8)	0.9 (2.3)	6.1 (15)
Average precipitation days (≥ 0.01 inch)	15	12	13	11	10	9	5	5	8	11	15	17	131

== Demographics ==
Historical population
Census	Pop.	Note	%±
1880	90		—
1890	513		470.0%
1910	310		—
1920	343		10.6%
1930	277		−19.2%
1940	325		17.3%
1950	379		16.6%
1960	740		95.3%
1970	678		−8.4%
1980	1,006		48.4%
1990	1,377		36.9%
2000	1,723		25.1%
2010	1,831		6.3%
2020	1,942		6.1%
U.S. Decennial Census; 2015 Estimate

=== 2020 census ===
As of the 2020 census, Coupeville had a population of 1,942. The median age was 55.9 years. 14.9% of residents were under the age of 18 and 35.8% of residents were 65 years of age or older. For every 100 females there were 77.0 males, and for every 100 females age 18 and over there were 76.0 males age 18 and over.

100.0% of residents lived in urban areas, while 0.0% lived in rural areas.

There were 914 households in Coupeville, of which 20.9% had children under the age of 18 living in them. Of all households, 44.3% were married-couple households, 13.3% were households with a male householder and no spouse or partner present, and 35.2% were households with a female householder and no spouse or partner present. About 36.1% of all households were made up of individuals and 20.7% had someone living alone who was 65 years of age or older.

There were 1,016 housing units, of which 10.0% were vacant. The homeowner vacancy rate was 0.3% and the rental vacancy rate was 3.9%.

Racial composition as of the 2020 census
Race	Number	Percent
White	1,525	78.5%
Black or African American	37	1.9%
American Indian and Alaska Native	26	1.3%
Asian	39	2.0%
Native Hawaiian and Other Pacific Islander	9	0.5%
Some other race	104	5.4%
Two or more races	202	10.4%
Hispanic or Latino (of any race)	201	10.4%

=== 2010 census ===
As of the 2010 census, there were 1,831 people, 806 households, and 428 families living in the town. The population density was 1,488.6 inhabitants per square mile (574.8/km^{2}). There were 933 housing units at an average density of 758.5 per square mile (292.9/km^{2}). The racial makeup of the town was 87.2% White, 1.6% African American, 0.6% Native American, 1.9% Asian, 0.3% Pacific Islander, 4.2% from other races, and 4.3% from two or more races. Hispanic or Latino of any race were 9.0% of the population.

There were 806 households, of which 21.1% had children under the age of 18 living with them, 42.8% were married couples living together, 7.3% had a female householder with no husband present, 3.0% had a male householder with no wife present, and 46.9% were non-families. 40.0% of all households were made up of individuals, and 19.4% had someone living alone who was 65 years of age or older. The average household size was 2.06 and the average family size was 2.77.

The median age in the town was 51.1 years. 17.1% of residents were under the age of 18; 6.3% were between the ages of 18 and 24; 19.1% were from 25 to 44; 29.9% were from 45 to 64; and 27.5% were 65 years of age or older. The gender makeup of the town was 44.3% male and 55.7% female.

=== 2000 census ===
As of the 2000 census, there were 1,723 people, 737 households, and 426 families living in the town. The population density was 1,346.7 people per square mile (519.7/km^{2}). There were 814 housing units at an average density of 636.2 per square mile (245.5/km^{2}). The racial makeup of the town was 89.8% White, 1.6% African American, 0.5% Native American, 2.2% Asian, 2.8% from other races, and 3.1% from two or more races. Hispanic or Latino of any race were 5.3% of the population.

There were 737 households, out of which 25.5% had children under the age of 18 living with them, 46.0% were married couples living together, 9.1% had a female householder with no husband present, and 42.1% were non-families. 36.9% of all households were made up of individuals, and 19.4% had someone living alone who was 65 years of age or older. The average household size was 2.16 and the average family size was 2.81.

In the town, the population was spread out, with 21.1% under the age of 18, 6.0% from 18 to 24, 25.0% from 25 to 44, 22.7% from 45 to 64, and 25.2% who were 65 years of age or older. The median age was 43 years. For every 100 females, there were 83.5 males. For every 100 females age 18 and over, there were 81.2 males.

The median income for a household in the town was $33,938, and the median income for a family was $47,721. Males had a median income of $33,235 versus $27,100 for females. The per capita income for the town was $18,720. About 8.9% of families and 11.4% of the population were below the poverty line, including 14.9% of those under age 18 and 8.2% of those age 65 or over.

== Education ==
The town is served by the Coupeville School District.

== Notable people ==
- Guy Bond, psychologist.
- Adrienne Lyle, Olympic dressage rider.

== See also ==
- Ebey's Landing National Historical Reserve−index of topics
- National Register of Historic Places listings in Island County, Washington
- Naval Outlying Landing Field Coupeville
