= Chuckanut Formation =

Geological feature of the American Pacific Northwest

- Stratigraphic range: Early to Late Eocene 55–35 Ma
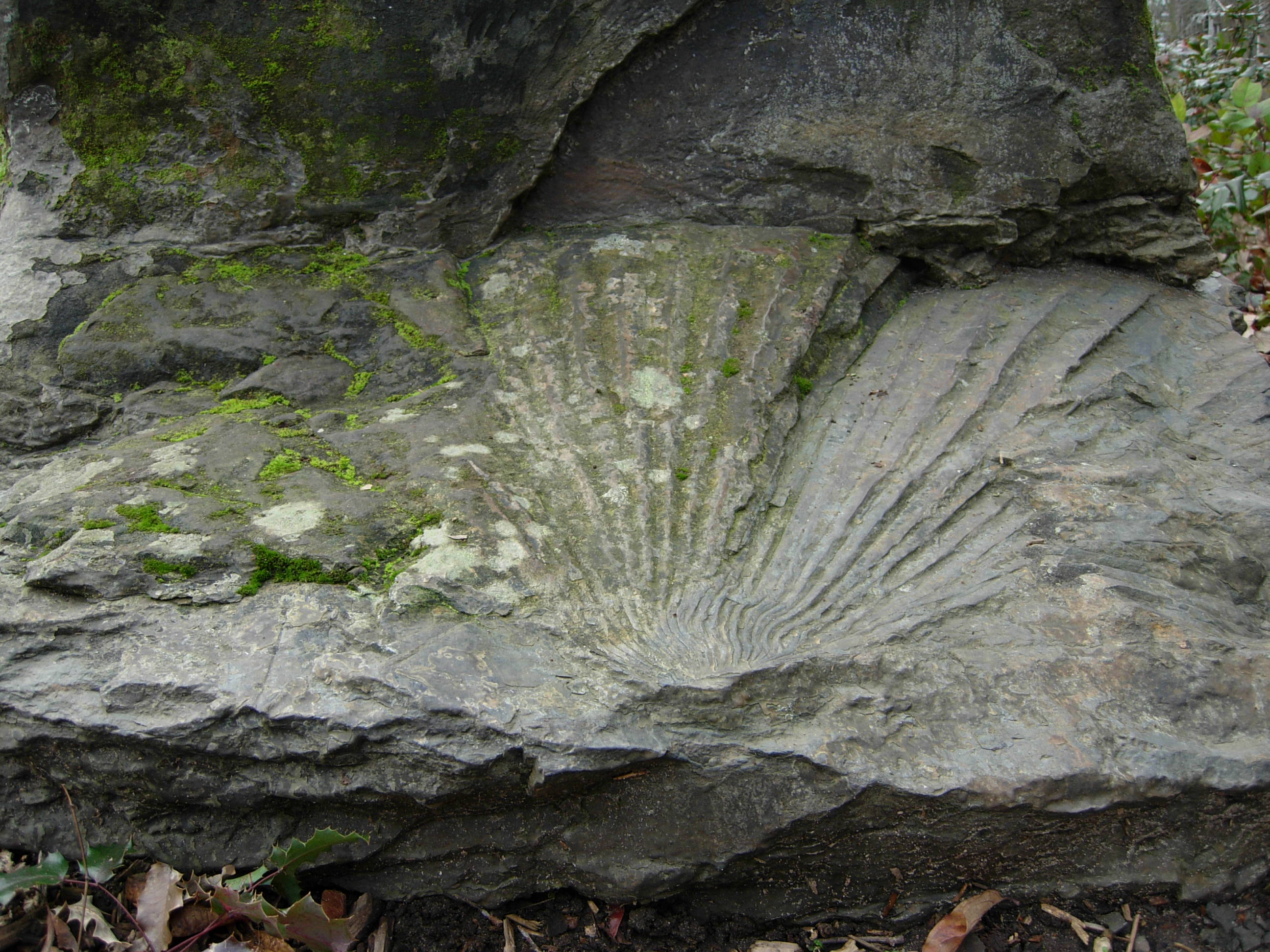
- Sabalites campbelli frond from the Chuckanut Formation
- Type: Geological formation
- Overlies: Nanaimo Group sediments
- Thickness: up to 6,000 metres (19,690 ft)

Lithology
- Primary: Sandstone
- Other: Shale, coal

Location
- Region: Northwest Washington
- Country: United States

Type section
- Named for: Chuckanut Mountains

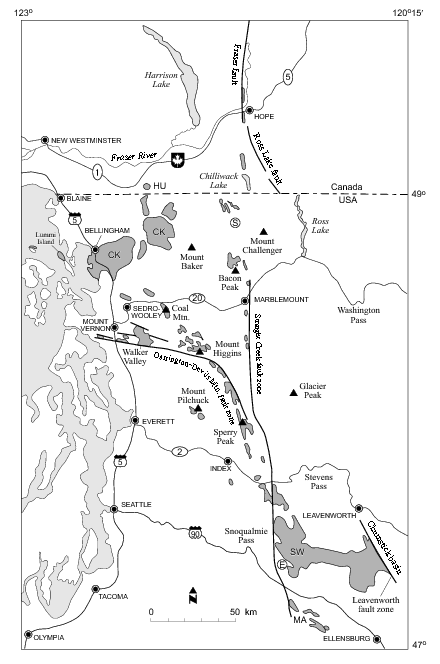
Outcrop map of the Chuckanut (CK), Huntingdon (HU), Swauk (SW, includes Roslyn and Chumstick), and Manastash (MA) Formations; other correlative formations not shown. (Figure 1 from Mustoe & Gannaway 1997.)

The Chuckanut Formation in northwestern Washington (named after the Chuckanut Mountains, near Bellingham), its extension in southwestern British Columbia (the Huntingdon Formation), and various related formations in central Washington (including the Swauk, Roslyn, Manastash, and Chumstick) are fluvial sedimentary formations of Eocene age, deposited from about 54 million years ago to around 34 million years ago. The nature of the deposits and included plant fossils indicate a low-lying coastal plain with a subtropical climate; the nature of the sediments indicates metamorphic sources in northeastern Washington.

== Extent ==
The original Chuckanut/Huntingdon/Swauk formation appears to have been deposited as a single unit in a large basin, and subsequently separated by faulting. The original extent of the formation is unknown, parts having been uplifted and eroded away, and the current extents largely covered by volcanic and glacial deposits. Early work suggested that the marine Nanaimo Group on Vancouver Island was correlated with the Chuckanut, but the Nanaimo Group is now known to be earlier (Upper Cretaceous). The principal outcrops of the Chuckanut Formation (marked CK on the map) are in the vicinity of Bellingham, with other outcrops as far south as the Darrington—Devils Mountain Fault Zone. The Swauk, Roslyn, Chumstick, and Manastash Formations (SW and MA) are on the east side of the Cascade Range and south of Mount Stuart (in the vicinity of Roslyn, Washington); the offset between these and the Chuckanut/Huntingdon is evidence of large-scale (about 110 km) strike-slip motion on the Straight Creek Fault, starting at 48 Ma. Other related formations (such as the Puget Group and Raging River Formation) occur east and south of Seattle. Other sedimentary formations of similar age and environment occur throughout southwestern Washington and western Oregon. Various sedimentary formations underlying Puget Sound and the eastern Olympic Peninsula (such as the Crescent Formation) are of similar age, but petrographically distinct, and appear to have different sources.

== Geology ==
The Chuckanut and related formations "are all composed predominantly of fine- to medium-grained sandstones with lesser amounts of interbedded shale, conglomerate, and coal." The sandstones consist of sand eroded from the Mount Stuart massif and probably from uplifted metamorphic sources in northeastern Washington (this was well before the rise of the Cascade Range), and distributed by rivers across a low-lying coastal plain starting about 54 Ma. These were laid over a metamorphic suite of rocks, those under the Chuckanut now known as the Shuksan, and its correlate under the Swauk known as the Easton. Near Vancouver parts of the Huntingdon Formation lie disconformably on parts of the Cretaceous Nanaimo Group.

Deposition of the Chuckanut continued as convergence of the Crescent Terrane (Olympic Peninsula) initiated strike-slip motion on the Straight Creek Fault (48 Ma), displacing much of the original formation to the north. Continued deposition across the Straight Creek Fault formed the Raging River and Puget Group formations east of Seattle; the former is partly marine, indicating it was probably a large delta, and locating the Eocene coast line. Deposition is believed to have largely ended in the late Eocene (around 42 Ma?) when regional uplift diverted the rivers supplying the sediments, but some deposition may have continued, supplied from local sources.

Johnson (1984) estimated a total thickness of 6,000 metres (20,000 ft), which would make the Chuckanut Formation one of the thickest nonmarine sedimentary sequences in North America. But more recent work suggest that, at least in parts, it may be only 2,500 metres (8,200 ft) thick.

== Fossils ==
Various plant and animal fossils have been found in the Chuckanut Formation. A fossil turtle shell was recovered from the formation at Clark Point in 1960. The specimen was held in the private collection of the finders until 1981 when it was examined at Western Washington University and identified as an indeterminate member of the Testudinoidea superfamily. Reexamination of the fossil in 2000 showed the specimen belongs to the Trionychidae family of soft shelled turtles. In 2023, the first articulated fossil fish was identified from the formation, which was a fragmented specimen of Phareodus.

Eocene fossil trackways are found in the Chuckanut Formation, composed of birds, mammals, and some turtle tracks. It is thought that the Chuckanut Formation shoreline was of riverine environments combined with a large scale "bedding plane" of material deposition. Four deposition or track sites are known.

== See also ==
- Geology of the Pacific Northwest
- Fossils
