= List of fossiliferous stratigraphic units in Washington (state) =

This article contains a list of fossil-bearing stratigraphic units in the state of Washington, U.S.

== Sites ==
Group or Formation	Period	Notes
Astoria Formation	Neogene	
Blakeley Formation	Paleogene	
Cedar District Formation	Cretaceous	
Clallam Formation	Neogene	
Cowlitz Formation	Paleogene	
Crescent Formation	Paleogene	
Douglas Canyon Formation	Neogene	
Ellensburg Formation	Neogene	
Keasey Formation	Paleogene	
Klondike Mountain Formation	Paleogene	
Latah Formation	Neogene	
Lincoln Formation	Paleogene	
Lincoln Creek Formation	Paleogene	
Makah Formation	Paleogene	
Merced Formation	Neogene	
Mission Argillite Formation	Permian	
Montesano Formation	Neogene	
Nanaimo Formation	Cretaceous	
Nooksack Formation	Cretaceous	
Offley Island Formation	Silurian	
Old Dominion Limestone Formation	Cambrian	
Porter Shale Formation	Paleogene	
Puget Formation	Paleogene	
Puget Group/Renton Formation	Paleogene	
Pysht Formation	Paleogene	
Quimper Sandstone Formation	Paleogene	
Raging River Formation	Paleogene	
Ringold Formation	Neogene	
Roslyn Formation	Paleogene	
Saanich Formation	Neogene	
Spieden Formation	Cretaceous	
Townsend Shale Formation	Paleogene	
Twin Rivers Formation	Paleogene	
Whidbey Formation		

== See also ==
- Paleontology in Washington (state)
