= Mussel Rock =

Island in the United States of America

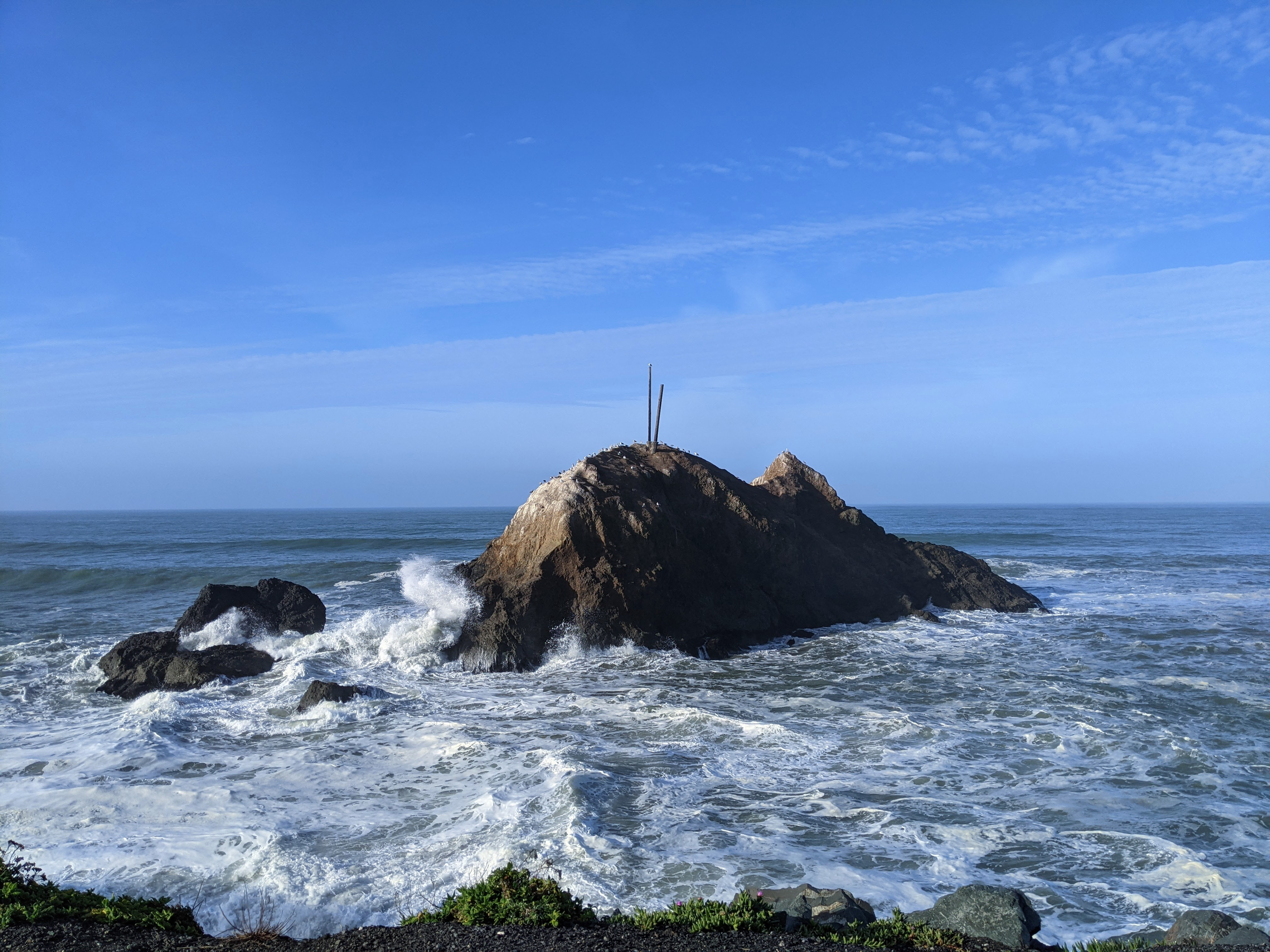
- Mussel Rock seen from the beach of the eponymous Mussel Rock Park.

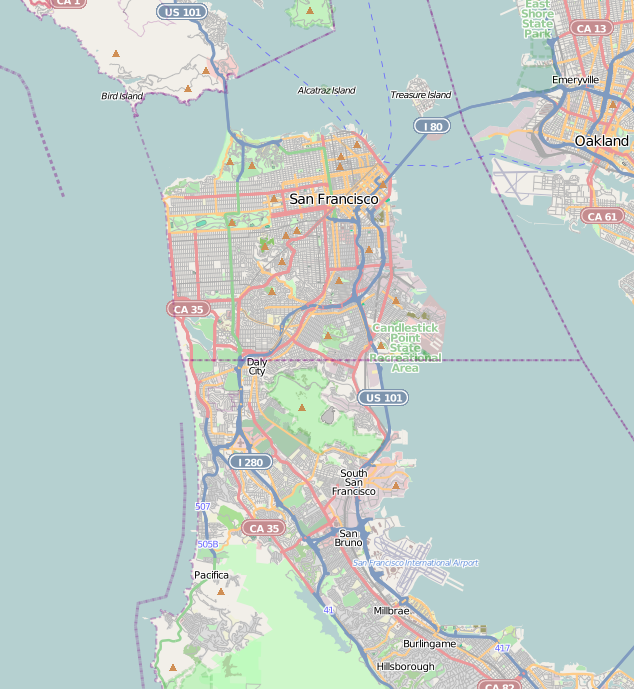
- Location within San Francisco Location within San Francisco Bay Area Location within California Location within the United States

Geography
- Location: Northern California
- Coordinates: 37°40′01″N 122°29′50″W
- Highest elevation: 60 ft (18 m)

Administration
- United States
- State: California
- County: San Mateo
- City: Daly City

Mussel Rock is a rock formation on the coast of San Mateo County, California, offshore from Daly City. It consists of one large and numerous smaller rocks of a type known as a stack, where a headland is eroded unevenly, leaving small islands. The rock itself is located 15 meters from the shore of Mussel Rock Park and stands 18 meters tall.

The coastal area adjacent to the rock is Mussel Rock Park, consisting of 250 acres of land stretching along the coastline. The park includes a beach area, a paragliding launch pad, hiking trails, and a parking lot.

It is best known for being the closest point to the epicenter of the 1906 San Francisco earthquake, and where the San Andreas Fault enters the San Francisco Peninsula from the northwest. An additional minor fault, the Mussel Rock Fault, was identified in 2000.

The area above Mussel Rock consists of steep cliffs with frequent landslides, threatening homes in a subdivision above.

== Geology ==
=== Geology of the Mussel Rock formation ===
The Mussel Rock formation itself is a sea stack of Cretaceous period greenstone, from the Franciscan Complex bedrock, dated 80 to 90 million years ago. Contrasted with the nearby 3 million year old sedimentary rocks of the Merced Formation, the metamorphosed marine basalt comprising the greenstone of the Mussel Rock Formation from the Franciscan complex is more resistant to erosive forces.

The Mussel Rock outcropping initially formed around 145 million years ago when movement from Pacific Plate forced the Farallon Plate southeast, subducting under the westward-bound North American Plate. The subduction sheared the uppermost crust of the Farallon plate, and the severed rock accumulated along the North American Plate.

John McPhee begins his 1993 book, Assembling California, with Mussel Rock. According to McPhee,

"Mussel Rock is a horse. As any geologist will tell you, a horse is a displaced rock mass that has been caught between the walls of a fault. This one appears to have got away ... green seas slammed against it and turned white. It was not a small rock. It was like a three-story building, standing in the Pacific, with brown pelicans on the roof ... after a five hundred-mile northwesterly drift through southern and central California, this was where the San Andreas Fault intersected the sea."

— John McPhee, Assembling California (1994)

=== Geology of the greater Mussel Rock coastal area ===
The coastline area surrounding the Mussel Rock formation is at the intersection of several geological formations. The lowermost portion of the Merced Formation lends friable marine sandstone to the area, deposited there 2-3 million years ago. The portion of the Merced formation at Mussel Rock is among the older sedimentary deposits, deeper in the continental shelf, pushed to the surface by faulting.

The Merced sandstone variably overlies the greenstone of the Franciscan Complex. These two bedrock structures are separated at the surface by the San Andreas Fault. To the northeast, a thin layer of the Colma formation overlies the Merced.

=== Erosion and landslides ===
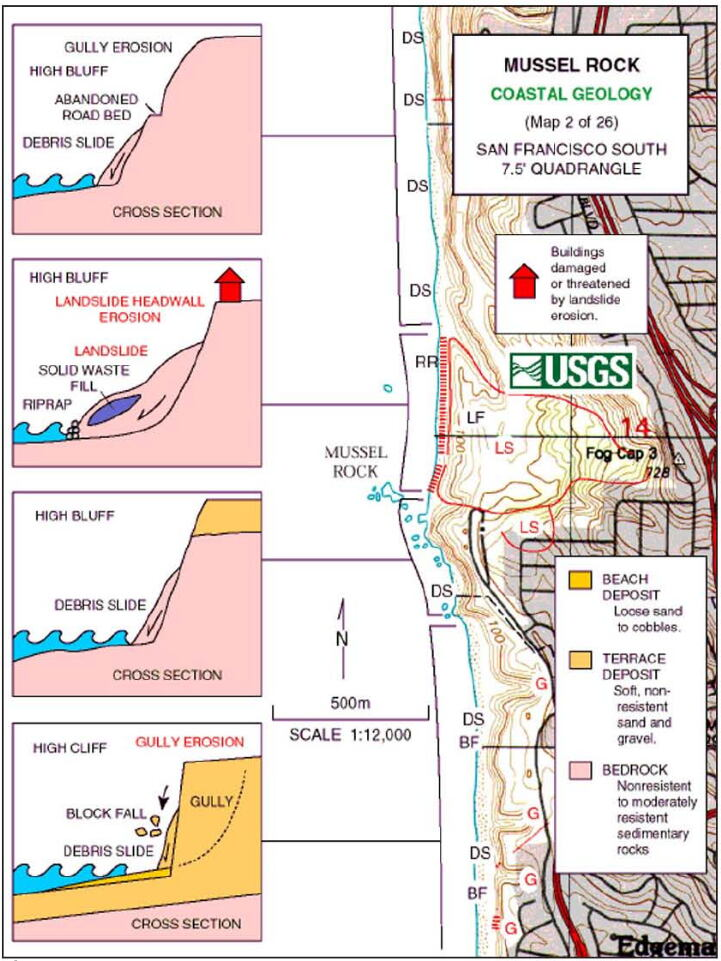
Coastal erosion diagram, 1982-83 El Niño cycle.

Due to active erosion, seismic activity, and the loosely cemented nature of the local Colma and Merced formations, the area is an active landslide zone. During ENSO years, coastal erosion on the Merced and Colma formations can average up to 2 to 3 feet per year. In addition to erosion via tides and winds, movement along the San Andreas Fault and Mussel Rock fault and construction along the clifftops contribute to erosion in the area, exacerbating the risk of landslides.

== Ecology ==
Mussel Rock visitors can harvest mussels, but only during the approved season and with guidance from the California Department of Public Health. The California Department of Public Health regularly tests for paralytic shellfish poisoning and posts advisory information on its website.

== History ==
The earliest recorded settlement at Mussel Rock was Ompuromo (ocean-flea place) inhabited by the Yelamu tribe of the Ohlone people. Based on carbon dating of archeological findings from a midden excavated at Mussel Rock, the village was estimated to date back to approximately 1500 AD, although Ohlone people are known to have inhabited the San Mateo area since at least 5,000 years ago, and lasted until Spanish colonization in 1776.

In 1978, the midden was excavated and found to contain artifacts including debris from lithic tool manufacturing and faunal remains from food items. Unfortunately, only 45 cubic meters were excavated before Daly City began the construction of the garbage sorting facility, Mussel Rock Transfer Station, atop the midden. The adjacent area was used as a landfill from 1958 to 1978, preventing any other nearby archeological excavation.

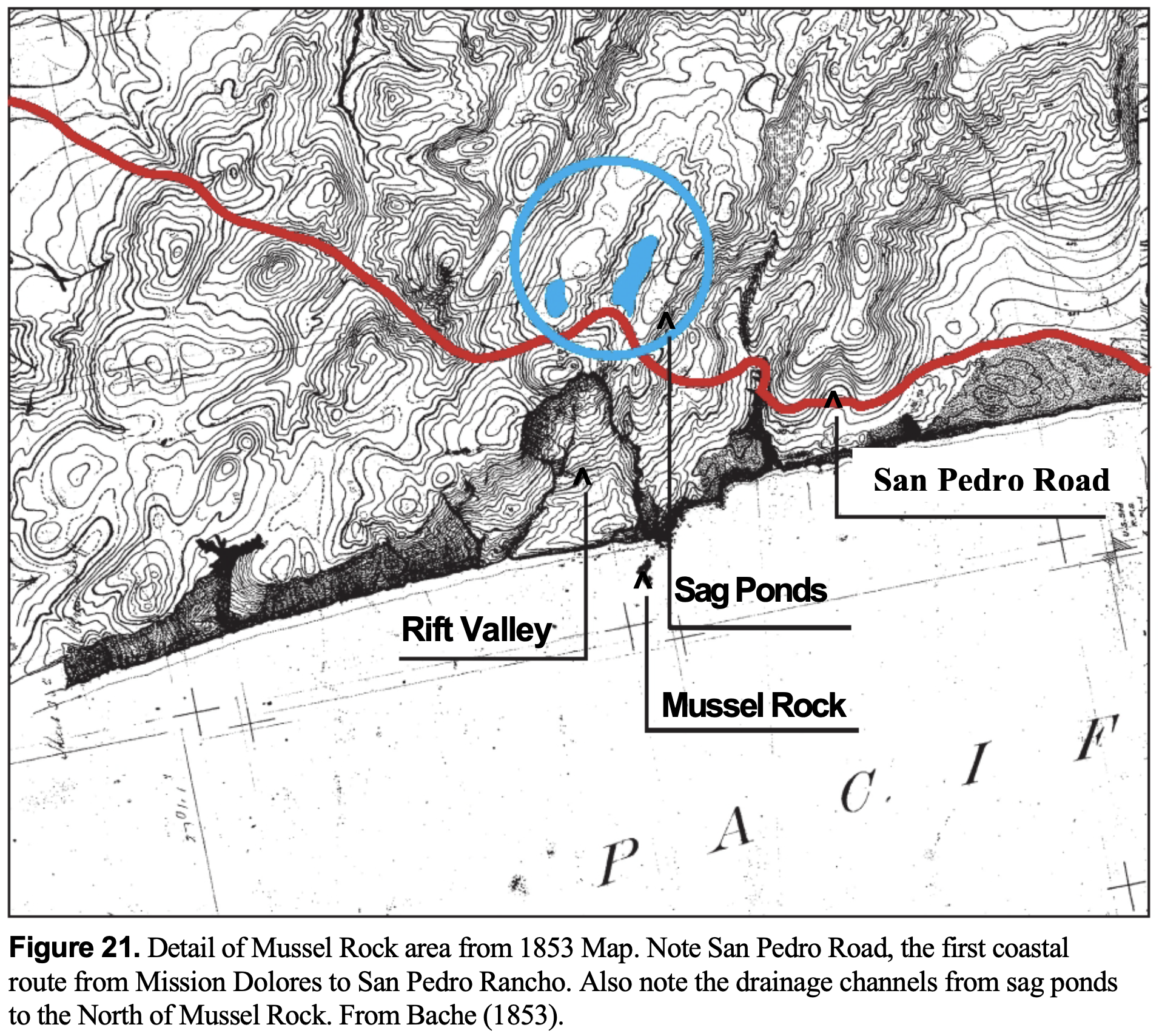
A map detailing Mussel Rock and the surrounding coastline in 1853.

== Gallery ==
Media of Mussel Rock
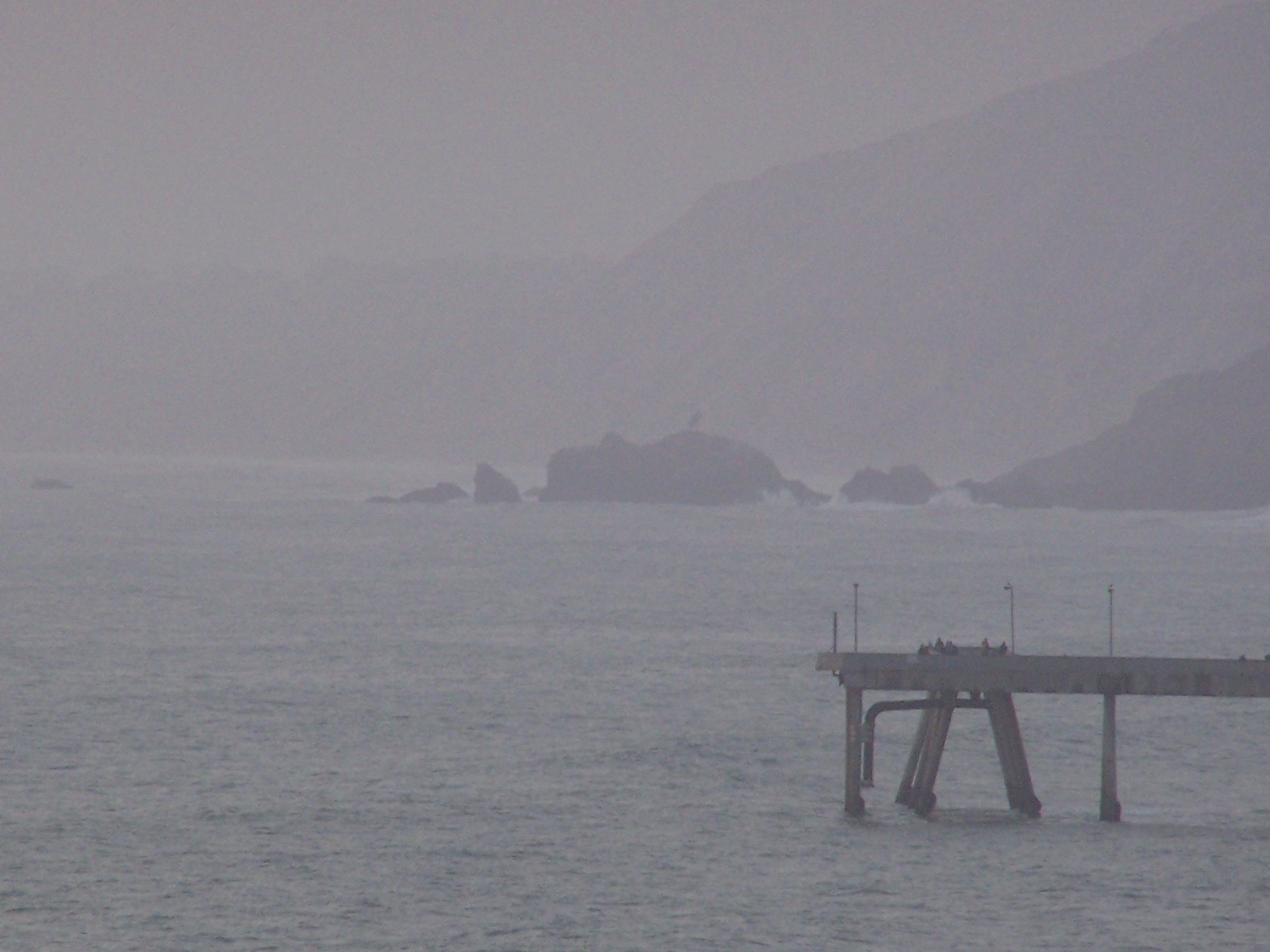
Mussel Rock, as seen from Mori Point in Pacifica, California. (July 2006)

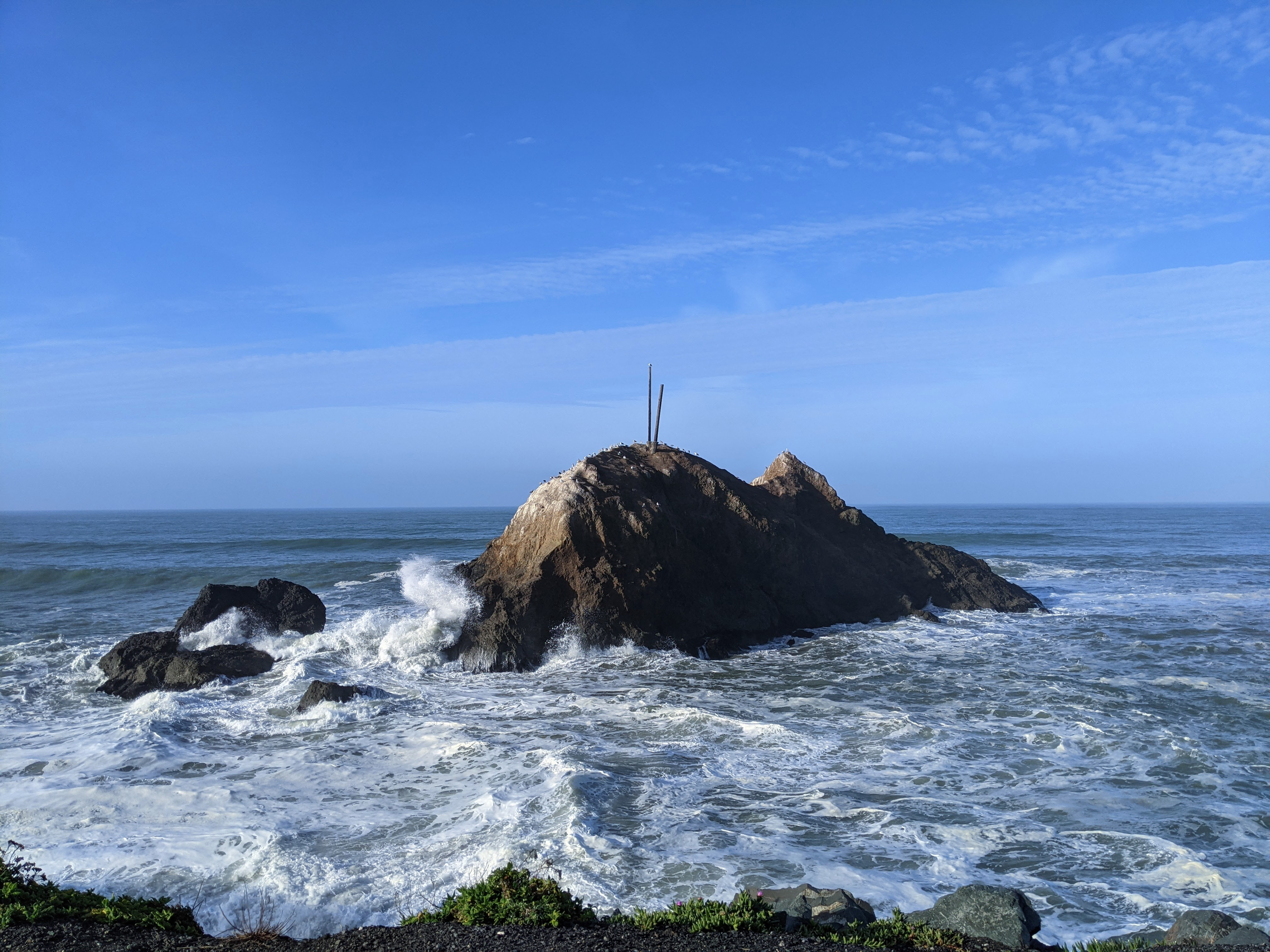
Mussel Rock seen from the beach of the eponymous Mussel Rock Park. (January 2021)

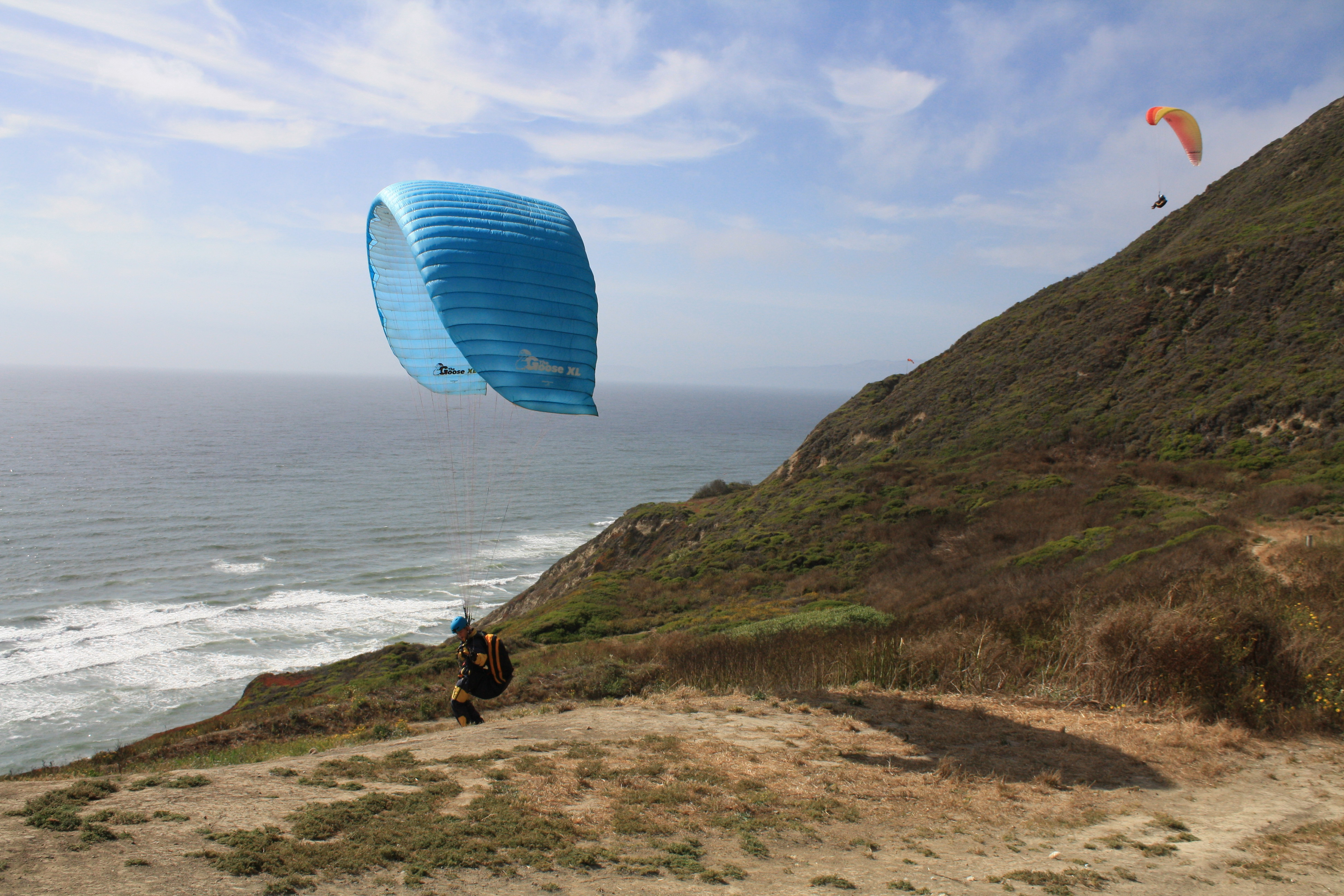
A pair of paragliders take flight at Mussel Rock Beach near Daly City, California.

A paragliding flight over the Mussel Rock Gliding Bluffs in Pacifica, California.

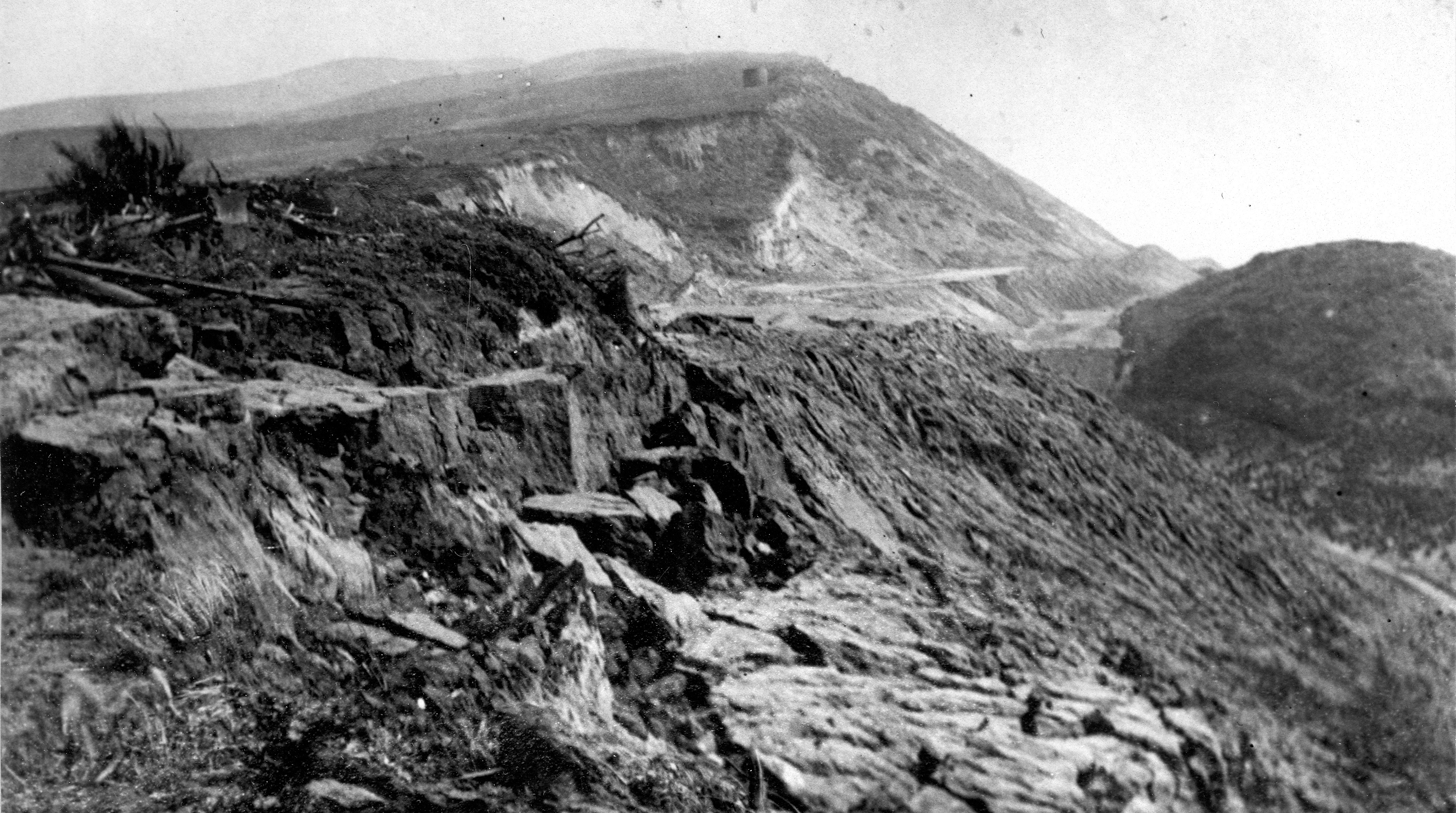
Landslide on the cliffs near Mussel Rock as a result of the 1906 San Francisco earthquake.

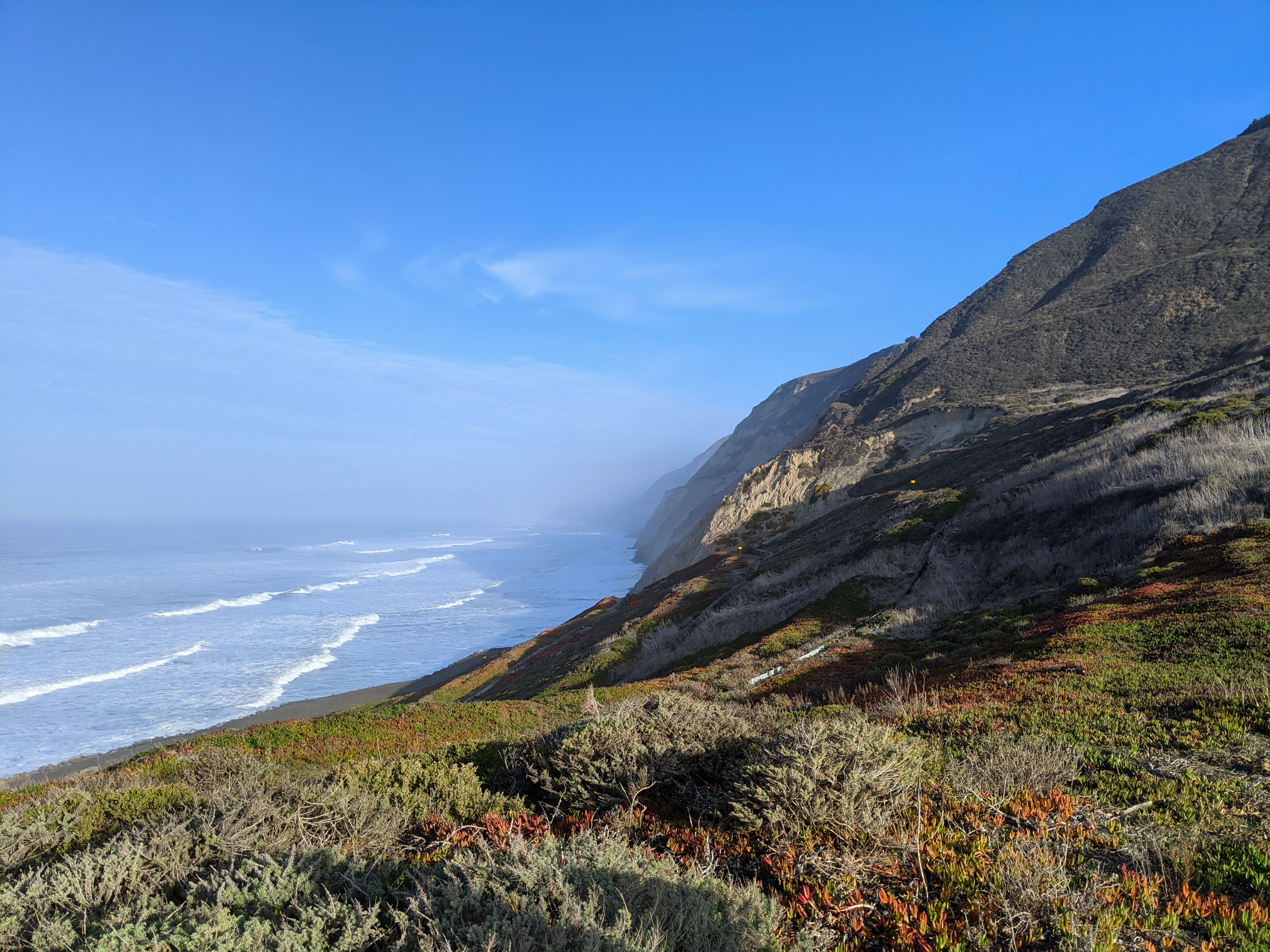
Coastal bluffs facing the pacific, photographed from a trail in Mussel Rock Park.

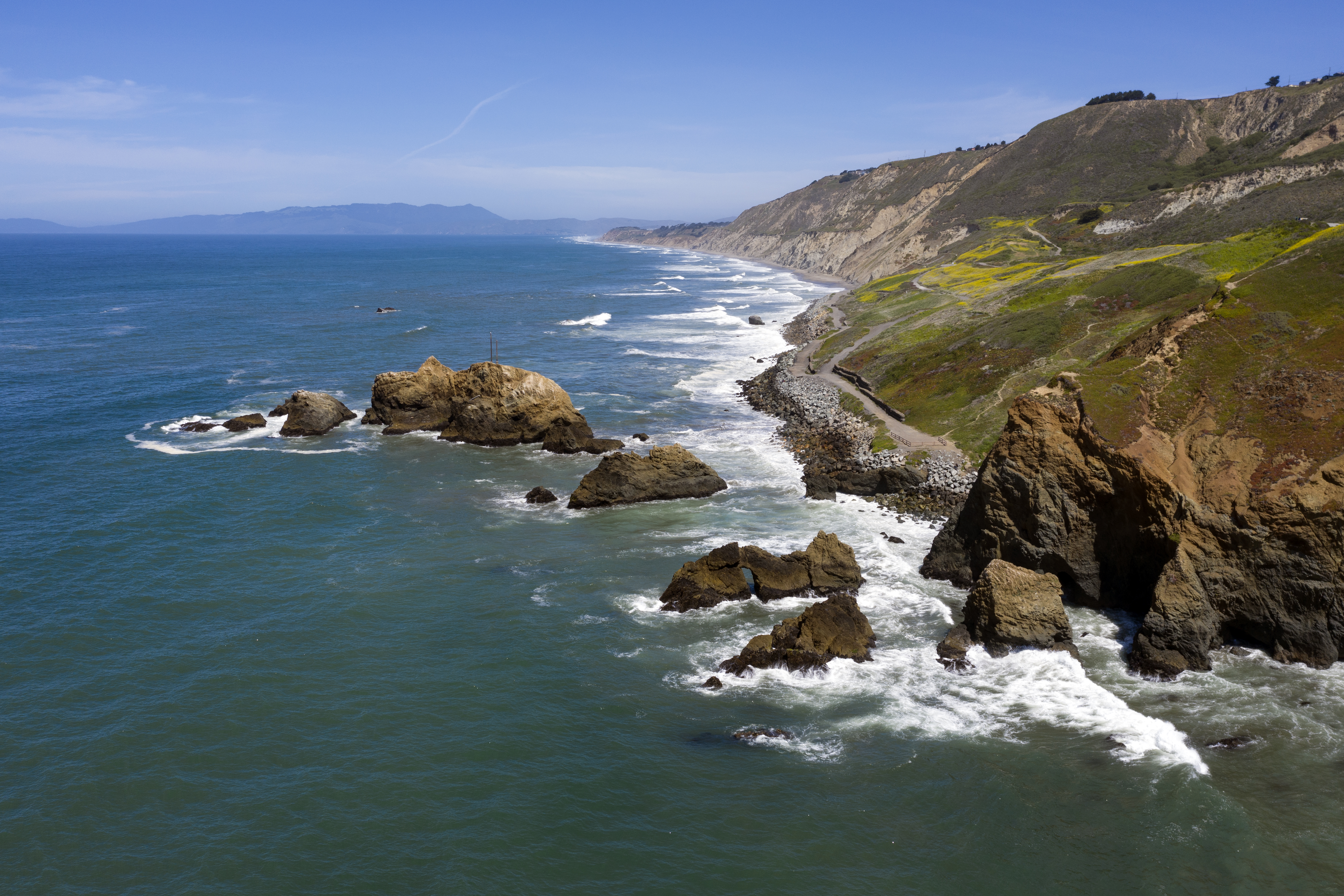
An aerial photo of Mussel Rock.

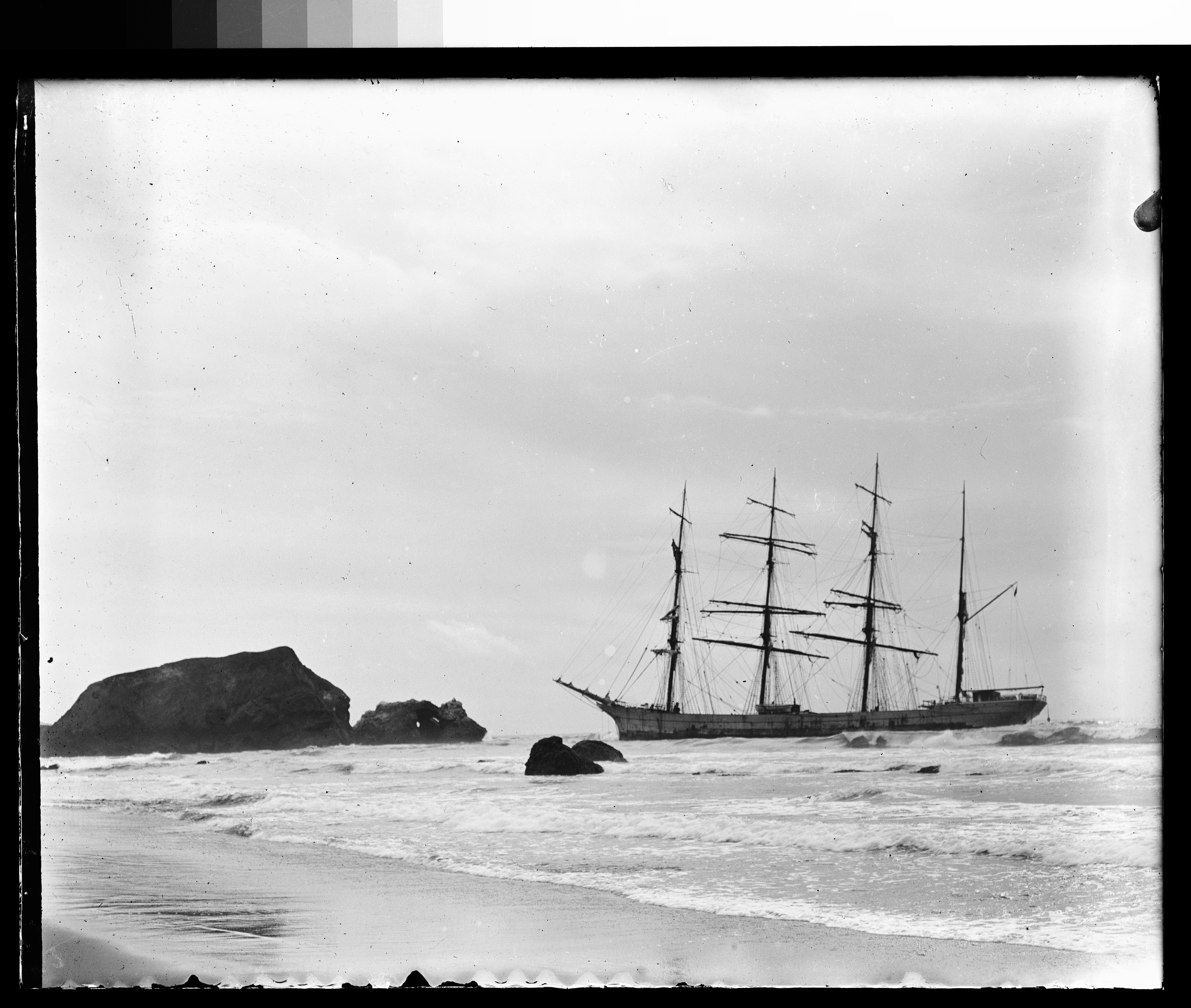
The four masted steel barque 'Gifford' wrecked at Mussel Rock in 1904.

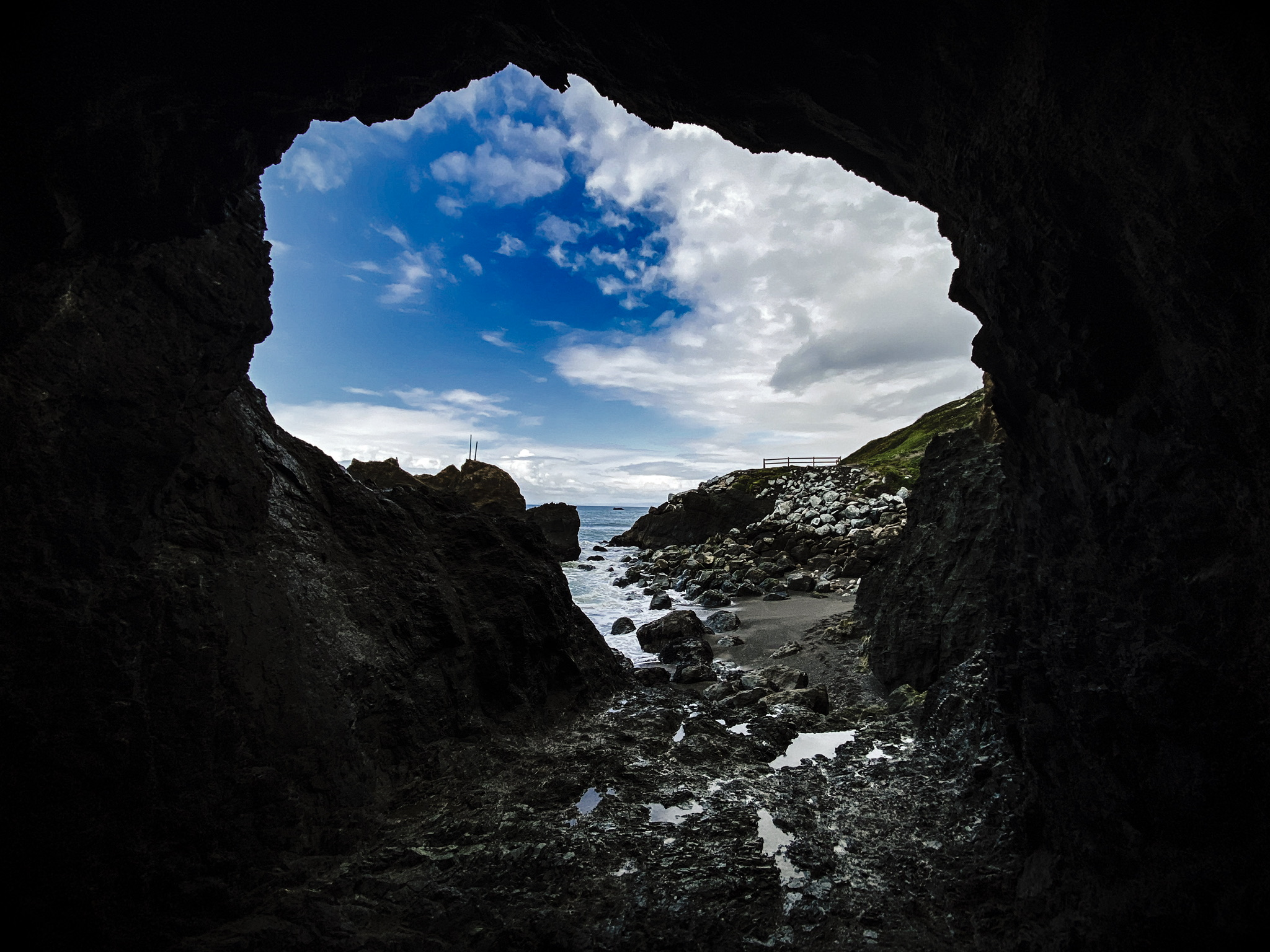
Low tide inside Tobin's Tunnel, a man-made stone tunnel near Mussel Rock.

== See also ==
- List of islands of California
