= Montesano Formation =

- Stratigraphic range: Neogene
- Type: Formation

Location
- Region: Washington (state)
- Country: United States

The Montesano Formation is a geologic formation in Washington (state). It preserves fossils dating back to the Neogene period.

== See also ==
- List of fossiliferous stratigraphic units in Washington (state)
- Paleontology in Washington (state)
