= Double Bluff Beach =

Beach located near Whidbey Island's southern end

- Beach
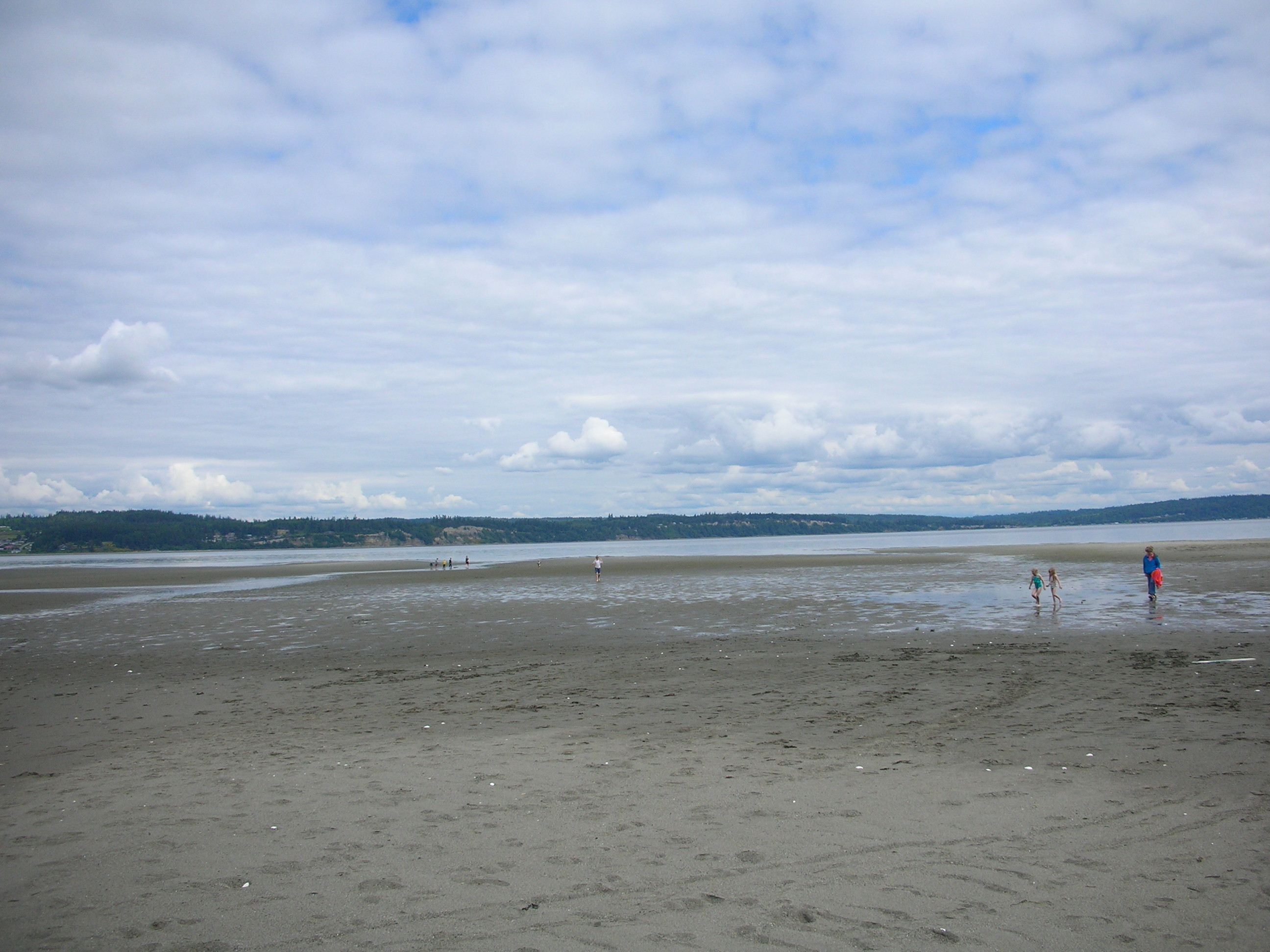
- Location: Island County, United States

Double Bluff Beach is a beach and headland on Whidbey Island in the U.S. state of Washington. The beach tidelands themselves comprise Double Bluff State Park. The uplands and access areas are operated by Island County, Washington as Double Bluff County Park and Beach Access.

== Geography ==
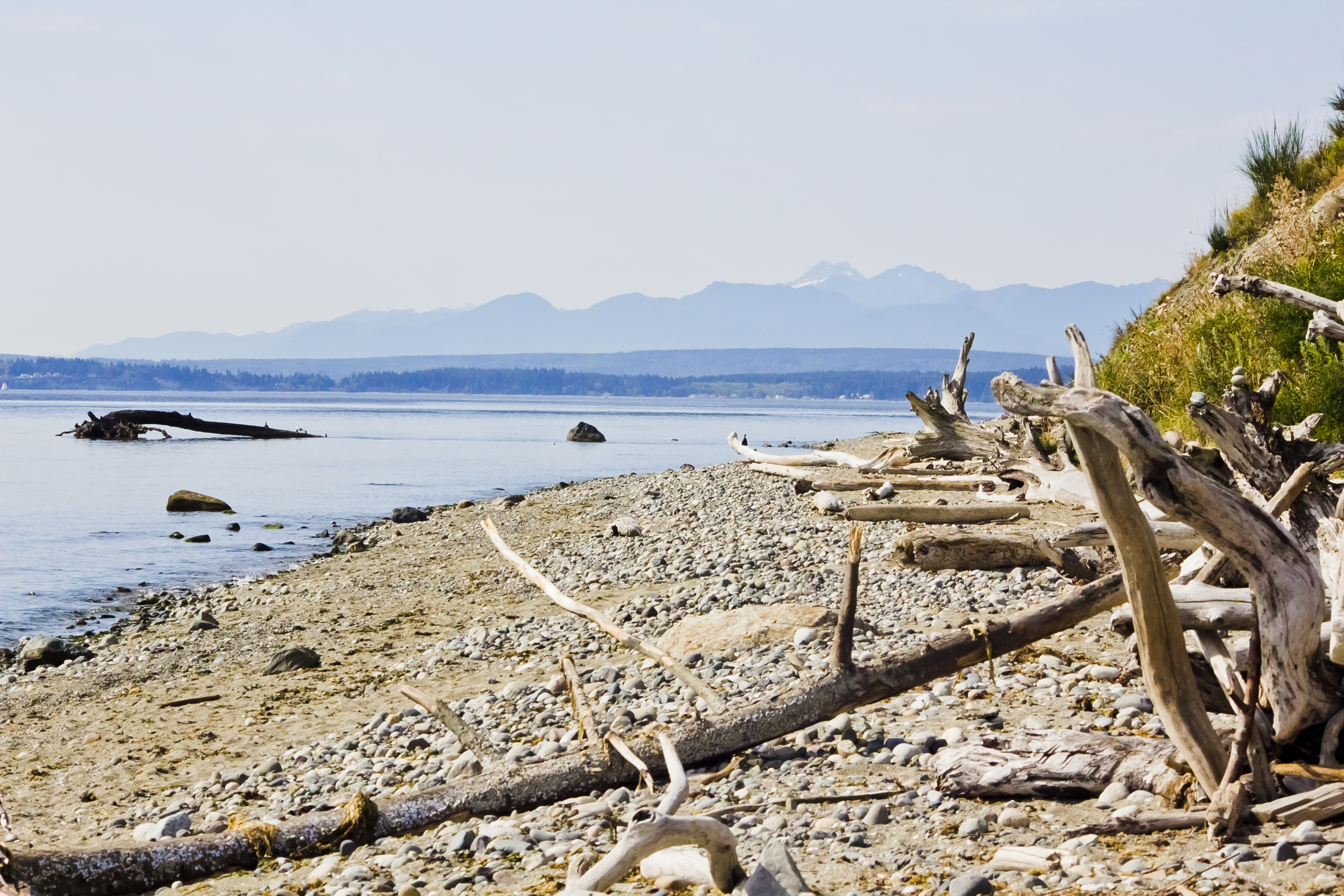
Double Bluff Beach looking west towards the Olympic Mountains.

Double Bluff is an approximately two-mile-long public beach located on southern Whidbey Island along the shores of Admiralty Inlet, north of Puget Sound. The beach access parking lot is roughly two miles from the retail core of Freeland. From the northern portions of the beach, the Olympic Mountains can be seen to the West. The southern portions face to the South, where in the distance one can see the highrises of Seattle roughly 30 miles away, dwarfed over by Mount Rainier which is roughly 100 miles away.

The Southern end of the shore faces South, toward Useless Bay and, further to the South, towards Puget Sound and Seattle. Fed by sand from the bluffs at its East and West ends, Useless Bay has a sandy, shallow slope; the horizontal distance between high and low tidelines can exceed 2500 feet.

Useless Bay opens to the West into Admiralty Inlet. The shore here abuts a large bluff which rises from Useless Bay and descends to Double Bluff several miles down the shore.

== Geology ==
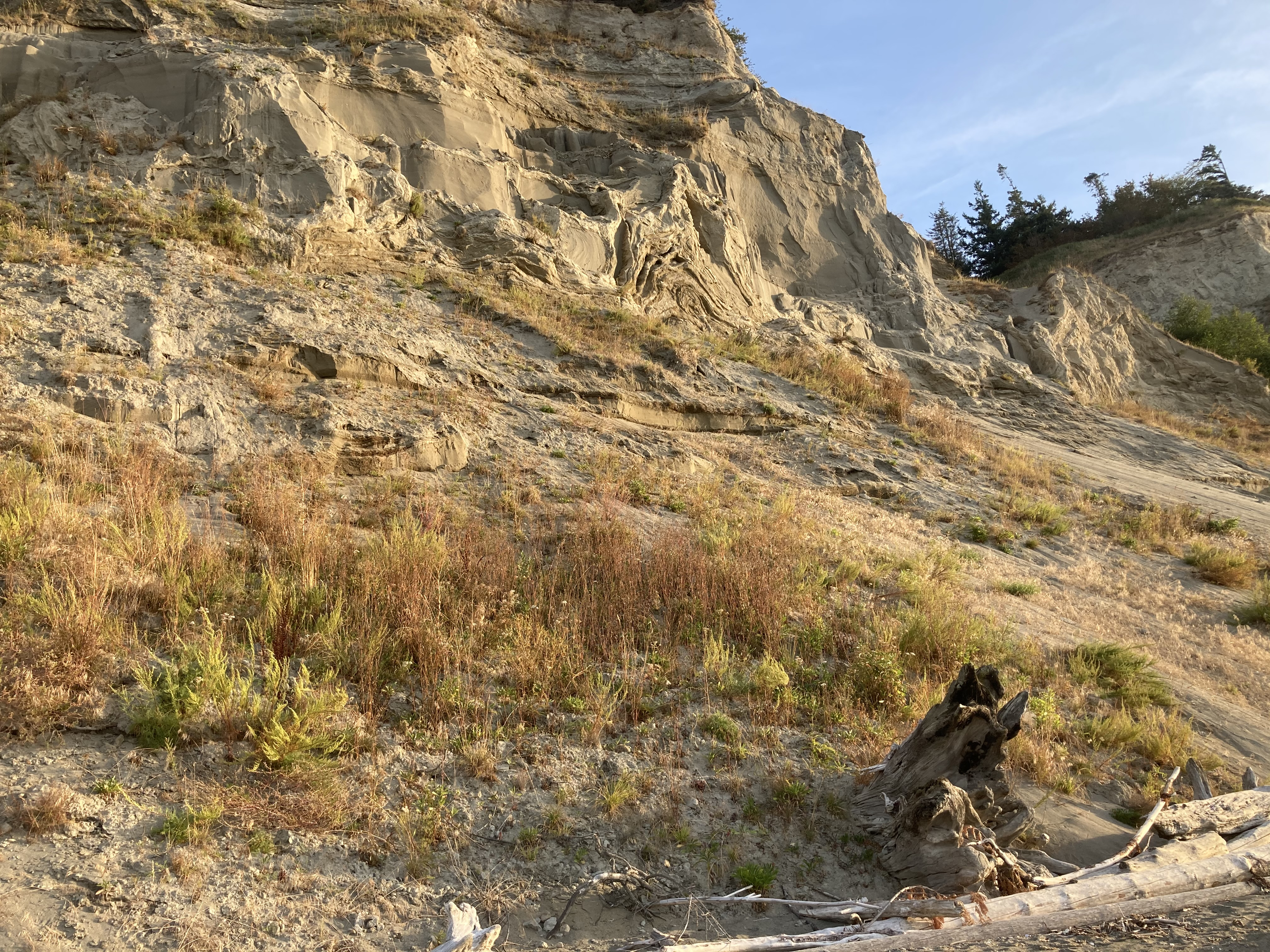
One of the titular bluffs on Double Bluff Beach, showing heavy erosion.

The primary character of the shore here is shifting sands eroded from the bluffs with large fields of pebbles, driftwood, slabs of peat, and glacial erratic boulders.

The bluffs at Double Bluff Beach are up to 300 feet high, and erosive processes that have been at work here since the last ice age—from wind, rain, and tides, as well as tectonic action from the South Whidbey Island Fault—have revealed many distinct geologic strata in the exposed bluff face.

The oldest strata come from the Double Bluff Glaciation (150,000 - 200,000 BP), and the youngest—at the very top of the bluffs—is composed of drift from the Possession Glaciation (~70,000 BP). Between these two layers is the Whidbey Formation, an interglacial layer composed of sediments laid down by lakes, streams and rivers within the Puget Sound basin, before it was inundated by the Pacific Ocean. The Whidbey Formation composes the majority of the visible bluff face and consists of poorly sorted silt, clay, and sands, pebbles, and compressed slabs of peat. Mammoth teeth and tusks have been found eroding from the bluff.

== Wildlife ==
Many species of wildlife may be found here including bald eagles, great blue herons, peregrine falcons, osprey, gulls, crows, river otters, several species of sea anemone, many species of crab, snails, sea urchins, and barnacles.

== Activities ==
Double Bluff Beach is popular with both locals and tourists because of its large size, easy access, and many activities. Many people build huts with drift wood on the beach. Other activities include:

- Walking
- Tidepool Exploration
- Birdwatching
- Swimming
- Skimboarding
- Picnicking
- Clamming (with license)
- Off Leash Dog Area
