= Grand Luxe =

Miami, Florida-based luxury exposition yacht

Seafair – M/V Grand Luxe
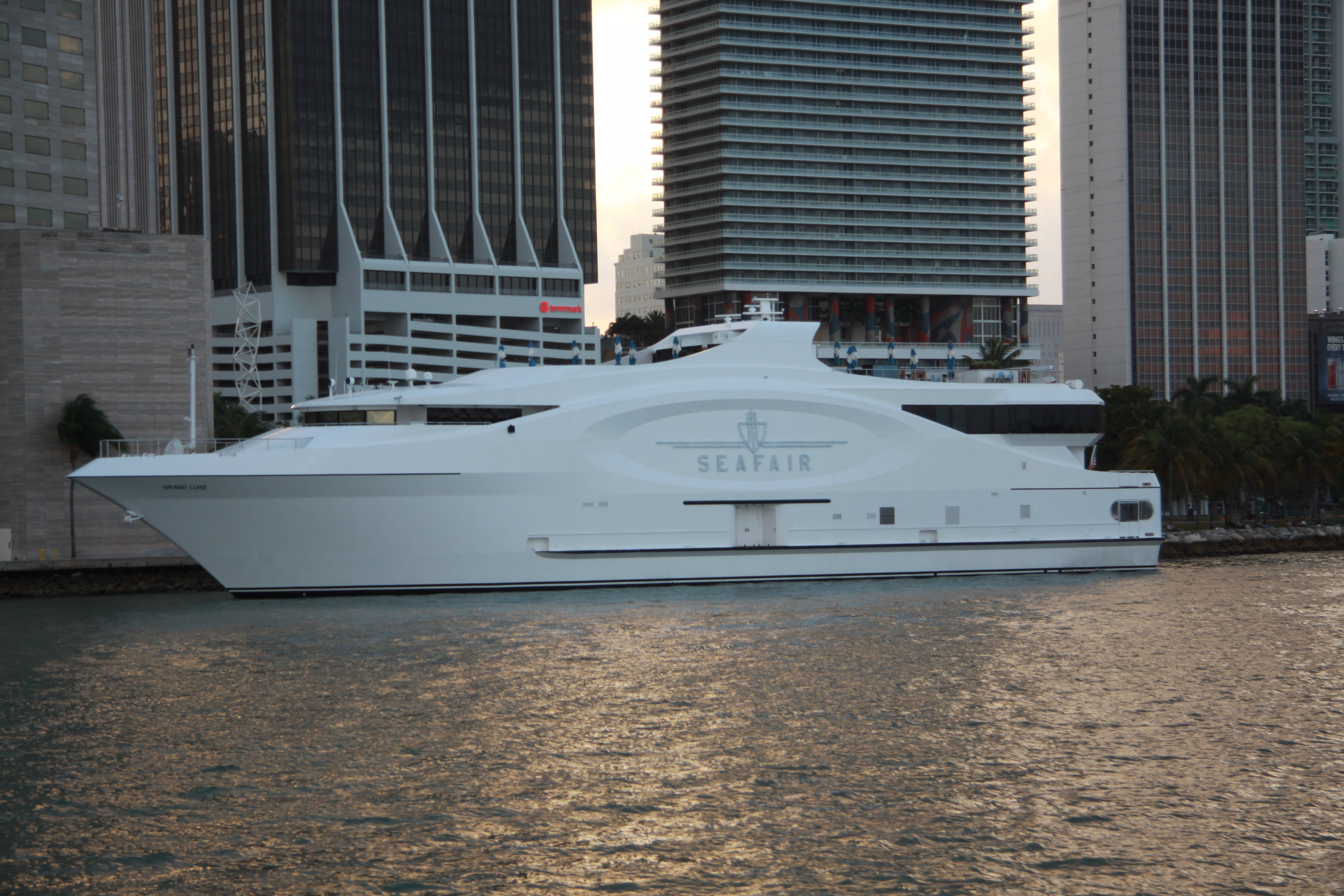

History

United States
- Name: M/V Grand Luxe
- Operator: Seafair Miami (Expoships)
- Route: Near Coastal
- Builder: Nichols Bros. Boat Builders
- Cost: $40,000,000
- Launched: 2007
- Identification: PSIX Vessel Number: 1195668; MMSI number: 367168190; Callsign: WDD6093
- Status: In Service

General characteristics
- Tonnage: 3,712 GT>
- Length: 228 ft (69 m)
- Beam: 48 ft (15 m)
- Draft: 6 ft 6 in (1.98 m)
- Propulsion: Diesel Reduction Gear
- Capacity: 600 Passengers
- Crew: 149 Crew

M/V Grand Luxe is a 220 ft (67 m) motor yacht launched in 2007 and operated by Seafair.

== Overview ==
It was designed by naval architects Dejong & Lebet and Luiz De Basto Designs, Dejong & Lebet. The ship was launched in 2007 in Freeland, Washington. The ship began service as an art museum, touring port cities along the US east coast.

In 2016 M/V Grand Luxe underwent a multi-million dollar renovation to become solely a venue for private events.
