= Old Dominion Limestone =

Geologic formation in Washington, United States

- Stratigraphic range: Cambrian
- Type: Formation

Location
- Region: Washington
- Country: United States

The Old Dominion Limestone is a geologic formation in Washington, United States. It preserves fossils dating back to the Cambrian period.

== See also ==
- List of fossiliferous stratigraphic units in Washington (state)
- Paleontology in Washington (state)
