= Nooksack Formation =

Geologic formation in Washington, U.S.

- Stratigraphic range: Cretaceous
- Type: Formation

Location
- Region: Washington
- Country: United States

The Nooksack Formation is a geologic formation in Washington. It preserves fossils dating back to the Cretaceous period.

== See also ==
- List of fossiliferous stratigraphic units in Washington (state)
- Paleontology in Washington (state)
