= Saanich Formation =

- Stratigraphic range: Late Pleistocene
- Type: Formation
- Overlies: ?Sooke formation

Lithology
- Primary: unlithified siliciclastic costal marine

Location
- Region: Puget Sound, Washington (state)
- Country: United States

The Saanich Formation is a geologic formation in the Puget Sound area of Washington. It consists of Pleistocene marine siloclastic deposits preserving fossils.

== See also ==
- List of fossiliferous stratigraphic units in Washington (state)
- Paleontology in Washington (state)
