= Renton Formation =

- Stratigraphic range: Paleogene
- Type: Formation
- Overlies: Tukwila Formation
- Thickness: Approx. 3,300 ft (1,000 m)

Location
- Region: Washington (state)
- Country: United States

Type section
- Named for: City of Renton

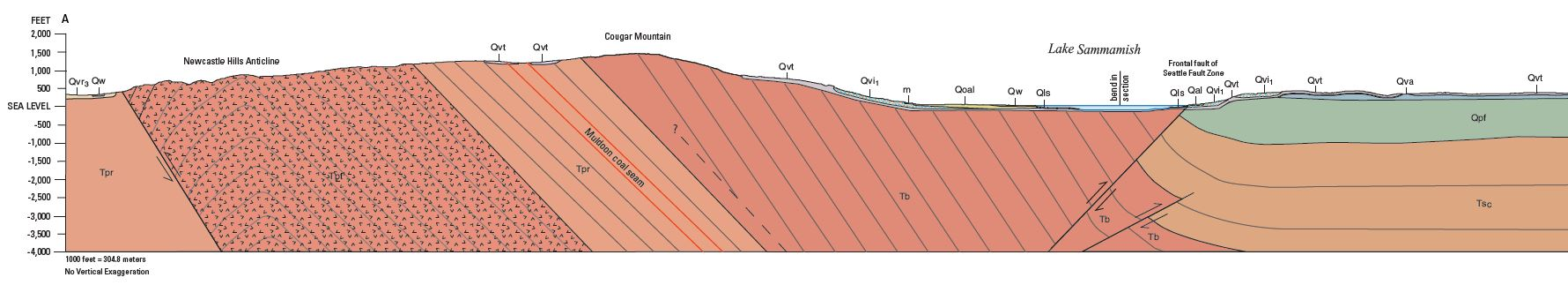
King County Geologic Cross Section

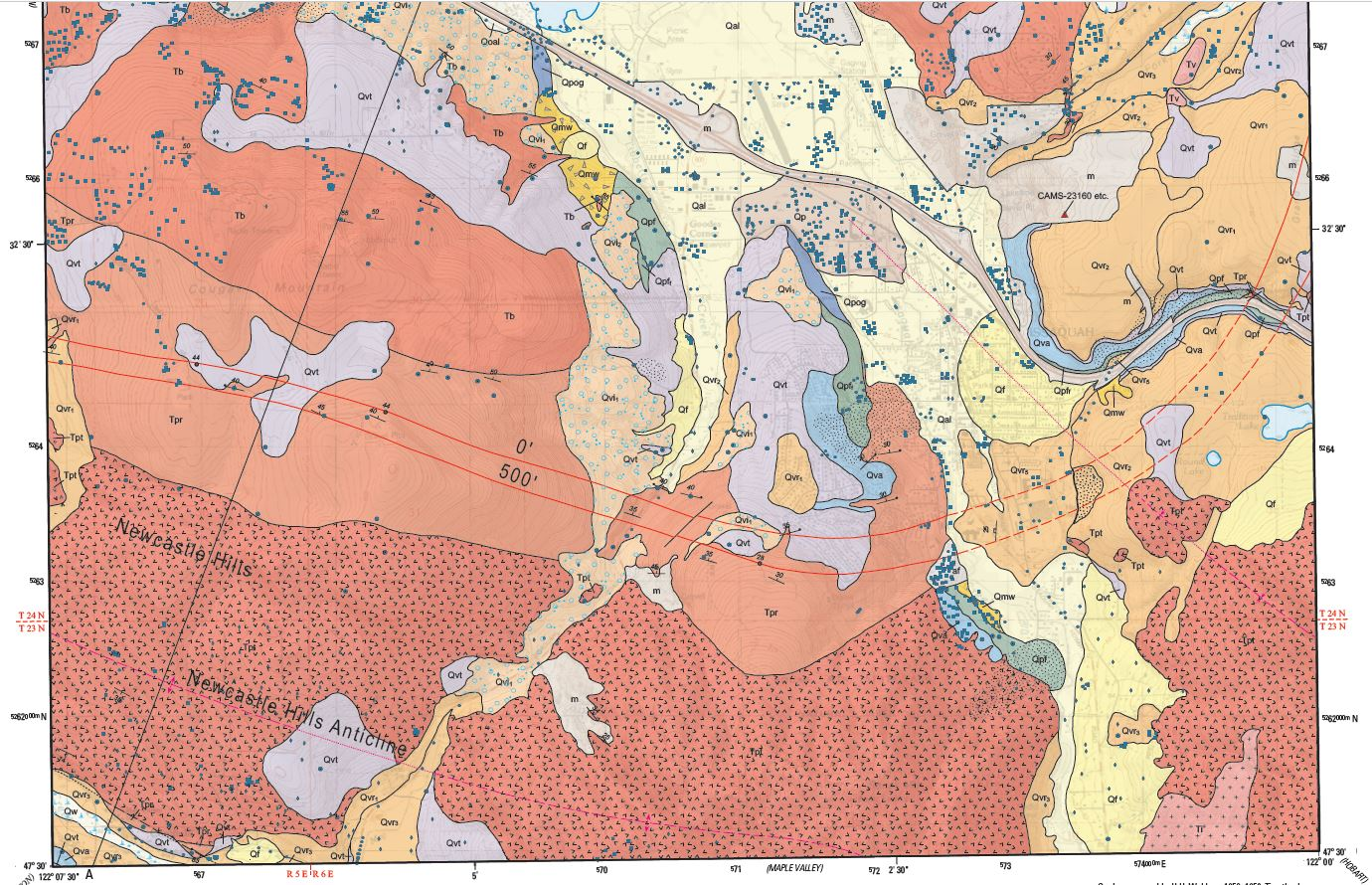
King County Geologic Map

The Renton Formation is a geologic formation in Washington (state) within the Puget Group. It preserves fossils dating back to the Paleogene period.

Most of the formation consists of fine- to medium-grained arkosic and feldspathic sandstone, interbedded with lesser amounts of siltstone, sandy shale, coal, and carbonaceous shale. Sandstone typically contains at least 40 percent subangular to subrounded quartz grains, 10 to 25 percent feldspar, and some mica and rock fragments, in a matrix of calcite, clay, and silt. Chert fragments constitute as much as 20 percent of some sandstones. Unoxidized rocks are mostly light gray but are light brown or buff where oxidized. The sandstone is weakly cemented, most commonly with calcite, but in places matrix silt and clay act as the binding agent. The sandstone and siltstone commonly are well sorted and thinly bedded; locally, the sandstone is massive or crossbedded. Some beds in the formation are very soft and plastic when wet, owing to the weathering or alteration of feldspar to a montmorillonitic clay.

The Renton formation is a nonmarine arkosic sandstone and siltstone, with carbonaceous shale, and noted for its Muldoon coal seams.

== See also ==
- List of fossiliferous stratigraphic units in Washington (state)
- Paleontology in Washington (state)

== Additional Reading ==
- Various Contributors to the Paleobiology Database. "Fossilworks: Gateway to the Paleobiology Database". Archived from the original on 25 March 2022.

Lidar-Revised Geologic Map of the Des Moines 7.5' Quadrangle, King County, Washington |url= https://pubs.usgs.gov/sim/3384/sim3384_pamphlet.pdf= 4 May 2020
