= Cowlitz Formation =

Geologic formation in Washington state

- Stratigraphic range: Paleogene
- Type: Formation
- Underlies: Keasey Formation

Location
- Coordinates: 46.2289°N 122.8995°W
- Region: Clatsop County, Oregon; Lewis County, Washington (state)
- Country: United States

The Cowlitz Formation is a geologic formation in Washington (state). It preserves fossils dating back to the Paleogene period

== Findings ==
The Cowlitz Formation holds fossils dating back to the Paleogene period. These fossils were discovered in 1911 through the work of Charles E. Weaver, Charles R. Fettkc, Donald Ross, T. A. Bonser, and Olaf Stromme in their task to study more closely the Tertiary Paleontology of Western Washington. Along with the Cowlitz Formation, they also closely observed the Tejon Formation. These two formations are a part of a greater Eocene of Western Washington. The basaltic lavas and tuffs occurring within the Eocene of western Washington have a thickness ranging from fifteen hundred to two thousand feet.

The Cowlitz Formation is located in the canyon of Olequa Creek between towns of Winlock and Olequa, in southwestern Lewis Co., and northwestern Cowlitz Co., WA.

The rocks composing this formation are sandstones, shales, conglomerates and subordinate amount of shaly limestone, together with numerous intercalated layers of tuff and basaltic lava. They arc partly marine and partly brackish water deposits.

A total Tertiary invertebrate marine fauna of forty five was discovered. Thirty of these were new and had been discovered for the first time. The Cowlitz Formation contained the following fauna:

- Pelecypoda
- Gasteropeda
- Brachyopoda
- Shark's Teeth

== See also ==
- List of fossiliferous stratigraphic units in Washington (state)
- Paleontology in Washington (state)
