= Crescent Formation =

Geologic formation in the State of Washington, United States

- Stratigraphic range: Ypresian (Wasatchian); ~55–50 Ma
- Type: Formation

Location
- Region: Washington
- Country: United States

The Crescent Formation is a geologic formation in Washington (state). It preserves fossils dating back to the Paleogene period.

== See also ==
- List of fossiliferous stratigraphic units in Washington (state)
- Paleontology in Washington (state)
