= Whidbey Formation =

- Stratigraphic range: Pleistocene
- Type: Formation

Lithology
- Primary: sediments

Location
- Region: Washington (state)
- Country: United States

The Whidbey Formation is a geologic formation in Washington (state). It preserves fossils.

== See also ==
- List of fossiliferous stratigraphic units in Washington (state)
- Paleontology in Washington (state)
