= Tukwila Formation =

- Stratigraphic range: Bartonian
- Type: Geological formation

Location
- Region: Washington
- Country: United States

Type section
- Named for: Tukwila, Washington

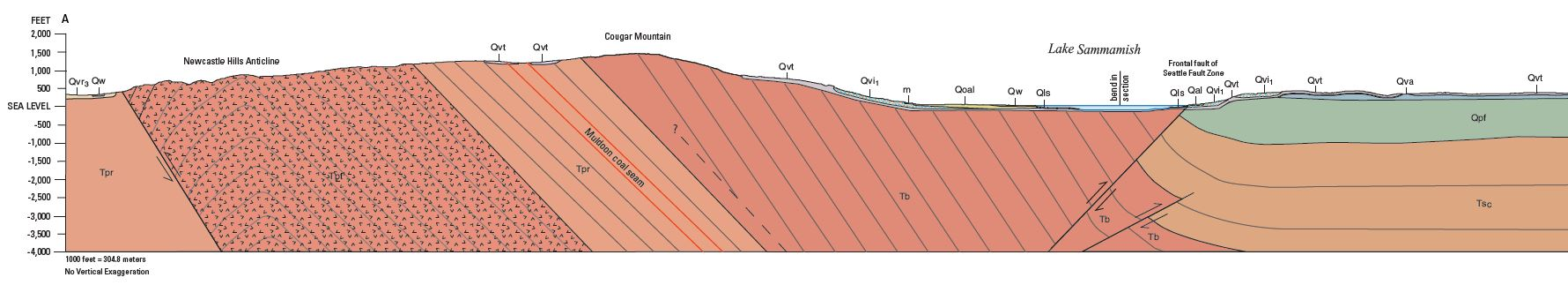
King County Geologic Cross Section

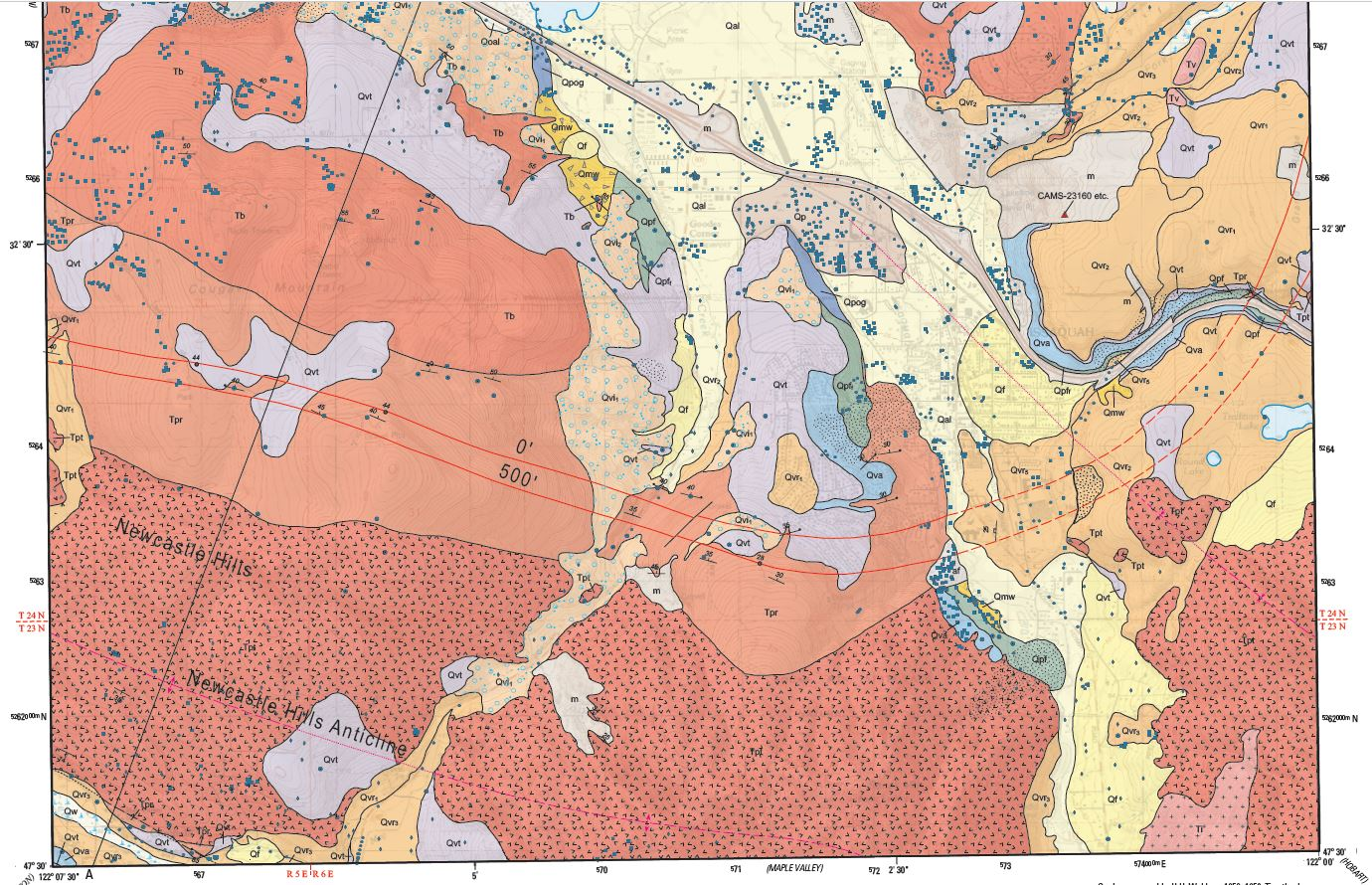
King County Geologic Map

The Tukwila Formation is a geological formation in King County, Washington within the Puget Group. It is named after the Tukwila area, which is close to the formation. The formation consists of various fossils of marine origin.

The Tukwila Formation is mainly composed of andesitic to dacitic volcanic sandstone, siltstone, shale, tuff breccia, tuff, lahar, and carbonaceous shales. The tuff breccia has an approximate age of 42 Ma.

== Fauna ==
=== Vertebrate fauna ===
Vertebrate fauna mainly consists of just shark remains. Mainly one unnamed species of Goblin shark and one unnamed species belonging to the same genus as the Whitetip reef shark.

- Triaenodon.sp
- Mitsukurina.sp

== Invertebrate fauna ==
Are the following:

- ? Coeloma martinezensis
- Zanthopsis vulgaris
- Terebratulina washingtoniana
- Protula sp.
- Glycymeris saggittata
- Venericardia clarki
- Colwellia bretzi
- Brisaster sp.
