= South Whidbey School District =

School district in Washington, United States

Coordinates: 48°02′04″N 122°24′10″W

South Whidbey School District #206 is a school district that operates on the "Southend" of Whidbey Island in the US state of Washington. The district offices are located in Langley. The current superintendent is Dr. Becky Clifford. The current school board consists of Brook Willeford, Andrea Downs, Marnie Jackson, Ann Johnson, Joe Greenheron, and two Student Representatives, Carter McKnight and Callahan Dobmier.

The district includes Langley, Clinton, and almost all of Freeland.

== Schools ==
South Whidbey School District consists of four schools. South Whidbey High School, South Whidbey Middle School (Formerly Langley Middle School), South Whidbey Elementary School, and South Whidbey Academy (a school of choice for K-12 students).

=== South Whidbey High School ===
Principal – John Patton
Vice Principal/Athletic Director: Paul Legerstedt
Grades Taught – 9–12
Enrollment (2010-11): 541

South Whidbey High School (SWHS) opened for the 1981–1982 school year. After only 8 years, enrollment grew larger than anticipated and additional classrooms were added in 1990. Some safety issues, as well as the need for improved access lead to a minor remodel in 1993. Enrollment continued to grow. From 1995 through 1997 an expansive upgrade, remodel, and expansion of the school occurred. This remodel removed a distinctive wall that had been a series of stairs and a ramp to the school's main entrance, on the second floor, and replaced it with new classrooms, an expanded Library and school office. Additionally, new kitchen facilities were constructed, as was a new lunch room, theatre, art room, and multi-purpose room. An auxiliary gym, mat room, fitness center and auditorium were also added. Prior to the expansion project in 1997, SWHS used three portable buildings, broken into six classrooms on the south side of the school. When the project was started, the buildings were moved to the north side of the school. After the expansion, the school district was going to sell the portables to those who needed them. However, the Off-Campus Extension Program (Now "Whidbey Island Academy") outgrew the former small space in Clinton, and because the portables were not in use, they moved in. SWHS currently ranks as 18th out of 356 of all high schools in Washington as best educational school. Its students score high in the W.A.S.L and other standardized tests, as well as having a high average GPA, and a low percentage of drop-out students. South Whidbey has been recognized as a Blue Ribbon school under the Blue Ribbon Schools Program for the 2007–08 school year.

=== South Whidbey Middle School (Formerly Langley Middle School) ===
Grades Taught – 5–8
Enrollment (2010-11): 398

Langley Middle School was one of the first schools to open on the "Southend" of Whidbey Island. It was open sometime in the late 1920s early 1930s.. The school comprises four class buildings and a sports/cafeteria complex. The "Main Building" was once the K-12 school for the Langley area. It later became K-9 after Langley High School was built on the property (now known as the "two-story building"). The school became 5–8 after the opening of the Primary School on Maxwelton road. Langley Middle School became 6–8 after the opening of the Intermediate School. As of September 2017 the middle school has closed, with grades 7-8 going to the high school and grade 6 going to the elementary school.

=== South Whidbey Elementary School ===
Principal – Jeff Cravy
Grades Taught – K-4
Enrollment (2013-14): 516

South Whidbey Elementary School (SWES) comprises both the former Primary School and the former Intermediate School campuses. The Intermediate School is the newest of the schools, having opened for the 1988–1989 school year. There have been some minor changes to it over the years. The most significant was the addition of a second outdoor covered play area in 1997, and a rearrangement of the school offices. SWES houses a community room specifically designated for local groups to hold meetings, regardless of time, without having to enter the main sections of the school. The school's soccer fields are utilized by the local youth soccer leagues. SWES also includes and uses parts of the former primary school which is located on the same piece of property.

SWIS was built to relieve the pressure of a growing student population at both South Whidbey Elementary School and (at the time) Langley Jr. High School. Previously, both LJHS and SWES had an extensive network of portable buildings to be able to accommodate students. After SWIS was opened, LMS moved all of its portable buildings to SWHS, and SWPS converted the portable for other uses, however, by 1990 SWPS was again using portables for classrooms. After only being used for 3 years, SWIS added a portable classroom in order to accommodate the growing student population. Behind the school is the remnants of a clearcut performed at the same time the area where the school it was cleared. This area was to be the location of a new South Whidbey Jr. High School, but the plans were scrapped after SWIS was redesigned with more classrooms for 5th grade students. The money made by the district in the sale of the lumber from the property partially paid for SWIS' construction.

Opened for the 1965-66 school year as South Whidbey Elementary, then renamed South Whidbey Primary School when the Intermediate School was built, and now part of the combined South Whidbey Elementary School (2009). It shares its design with several schools built at the time in Washington, including an elementary school in Oak Harbor. The school comprises a number of classrooms, a multi-purpose-room and cafeteria, offices, a computer lab, and a library. Since its closure as a primary school, it now houses South Whidbey Academy (described above) as well as ECEAP ad several community preschools have taken over the campus. In addition, special education offices and services are delivered in the previous office.

When the original South Whidbey Elementary opened in 1965, it was to encompass the entire "Southend" of Whidbey Island. As a result, all of the other schools in the area were forced to close.

=== South Whidbey Academy ===
is South Whidbey School District's K-12 Parent-Partnered-Program / Alternative School located on the campus of South Whidbey High School
