= Merced Formation =

Geologic formation in the United States

- Stratigraphic range: Pliocene, Neogene Period
- Type: Geologic formation
- Underlies: Colma Formation (California)
- Overlies: Bedrock (California)

Lithology
- Primary: sedimentary rock (California)

Location
- Region: San Francisco Bay Area of California, Oregon, Washington (state)
- Country: United States

Type section
- Named for: Lake Merced

The Merced Formation is a geologic formation in California, and also in Oregon and Washington state. It is named for Lake Merced, a natural lake on the western San Francisco coastline. The California portion is composed of a variety of sediments deposited on the coast of the San Francisco Bay Area in a small basin, which was split into two halves by the San Andreas Fault.

== Geology ==
=== California ===
In the coastal San Francisco Bay Area of California the Merced Formation was deposited in a small sedimentary basin that formed along the San Andreas Fault during the last two million years during the Pliocene age of the Neogene period, in the Cenozoic Era. It is composed of sediments deposited in a variety of coastal settings and depths, including coastal shelf, nearshore, and even non-marine environments. Younger layers of the formation show a general shallowing trend in the water, but superimposed on this, there is a periodic small-scale repetition of slightly deeper and shallower environments, resulting from sea level oscillations caused by climate change. The repeated occurrence of shallow-water deposits in the sequence indicates that the formation was deposited in a subsiding sea. Marine deposits in the formation are varied. One section includes a layer of dark, bioturbated sand, a layer of parallel laminated and burrowed sand and silt, and a layer of cross-bedded gravel and pebbly sand.

The fault cut the basin into two pieces and moved the pieces apart. It is found on the east side of the fault in western San Francisco and northern San Mateo County. On the west side of the fault it was carried 20 miles (32 km) north to the Bolinas headlands of western Marin County.

Fort Funston is on a bluff made up of exposed sedimentary rocks of the Merced Formation, in San Francisco within the NPS Golden Gate National Recreation Area.

== Paleobiota ==
=== Mammals ===
==== Cetaceans ====
| Genus | Species | Location | Notes |
|---|---|---|---|
| Balaenula | - | Golden Gate Rec. Area, Fort Funston | An extinct genus of whale. |

==== Carnivores ====
| Genus | Species | Location | Notes |
|---|---|---|---|
| Enhydra | Enhydra lutris | Golden Gate Rec. Area | A sea otter. |

=== Crustaceans ===
==== Barnacles ====
| Genus | Species | Location | Notes |
|---|---|---|---|
| Balanus | - | Fort Funston | A barnacle. |

== See also ==
- List of fossiliferous stratigraphic units in California
- Paleontology in California
- List of fossiliferous stratigraphic units in Washington (state)
- Paleontology in Washington (state)
