= Raging River Formation =

Geological formation in Washington

- Stratigraphic range: Paleogene
- Type: Formation

Location
- Region: Washington (state)
- Country: United States

The Raging River Formation is a geologic formation in Washington (state). It preserves fossils dating back to the Paleogene period.

== See also ==
- List of fossiliferous stratigraphic units in Washington (state)
- Paleontology in Washington (state)
