= Keasey Formation =

Geologic formation in northwestern Oregon

- Stratigraphic range: Priabonian-Rupelian
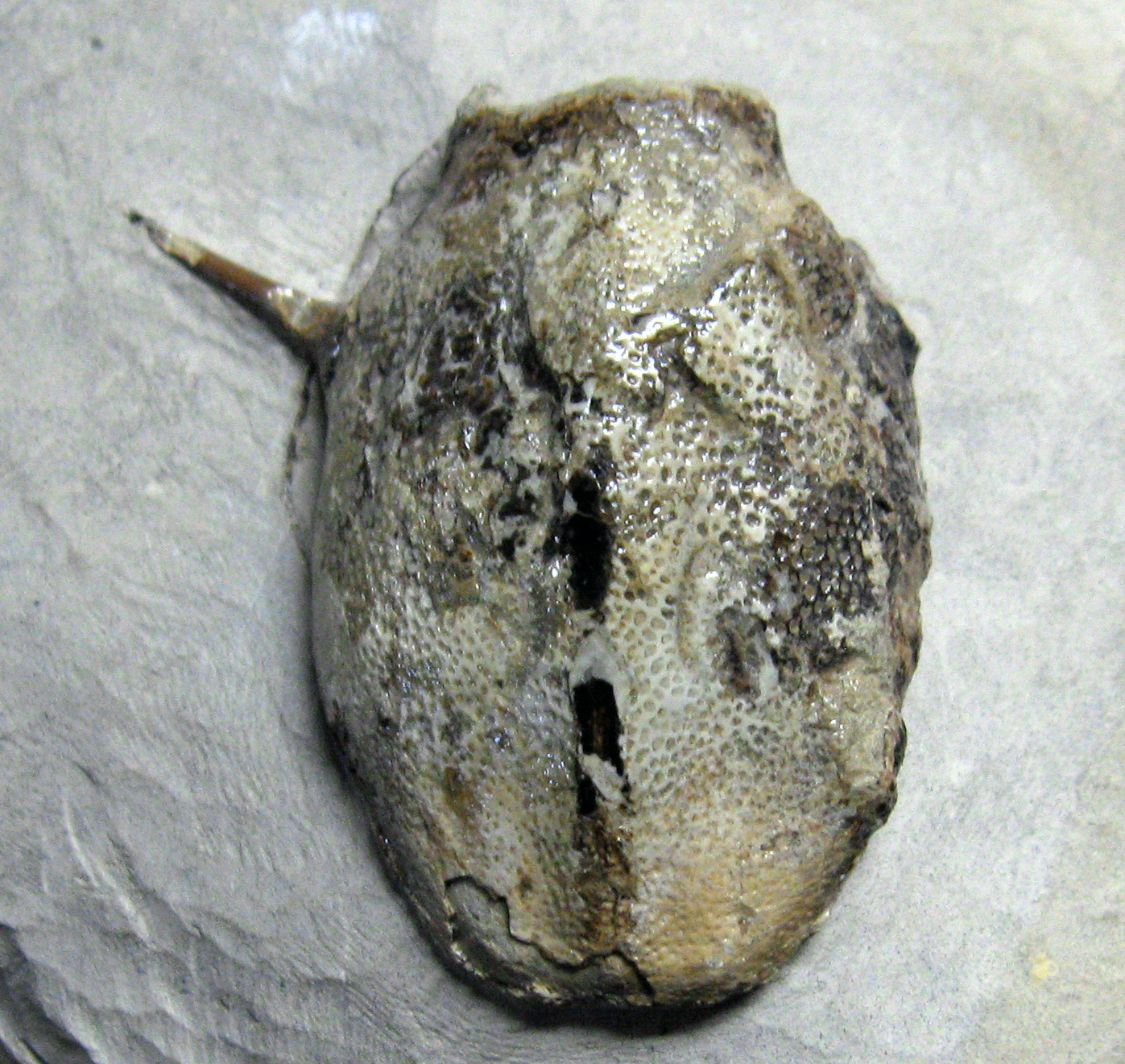
- Fossil from the Keasey Formation
- Type: Formation
- Underlies: Pittsburg Bluff Formation
- Overlies: Cowlitz Formation

Location
- Region: Oregon
- Country: United States

The Keasey Formation is a geologic formation in northwestern Oregon. It preserves fossils dating back to the Paleogene period.
