= Freeland, Washington =

- Census-designated place
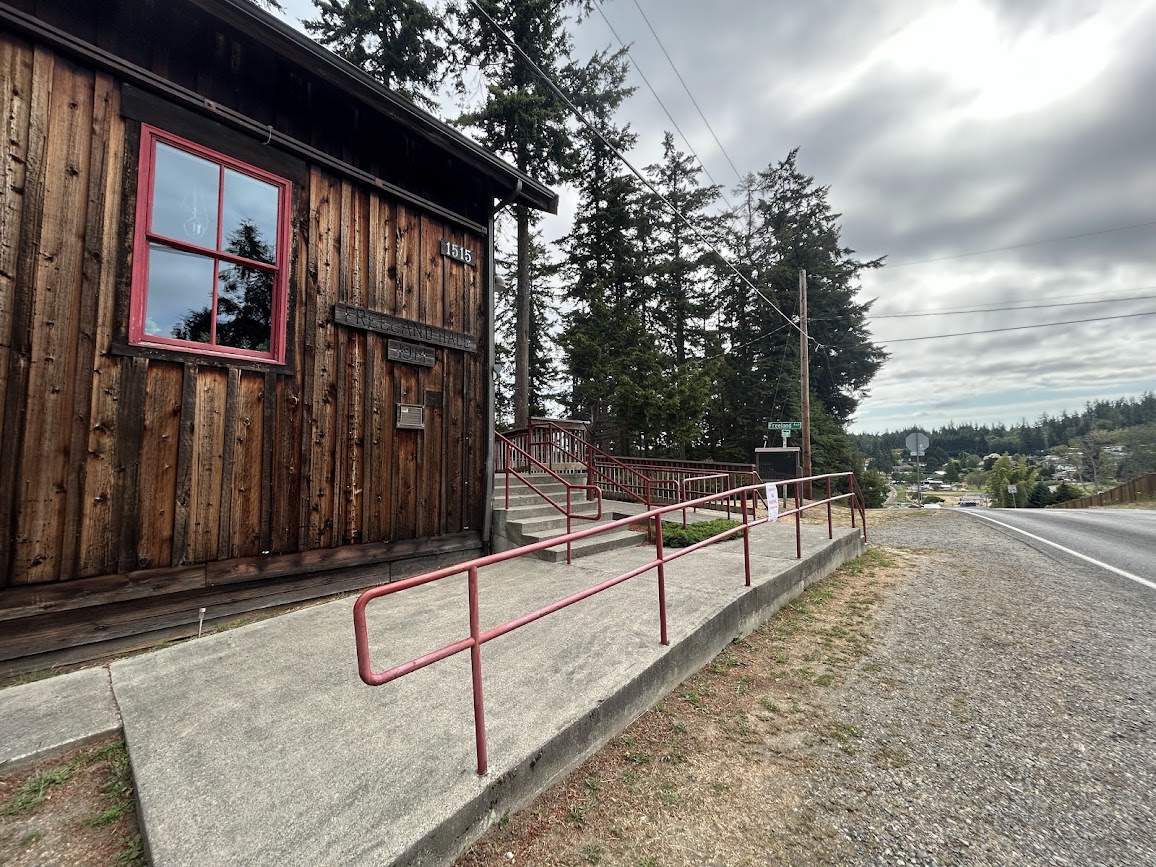
- Freeland Hall community meeting space, built 1914

- Location of Freeland, Washington
- Coordinates: 48°00′14″N 122°32′20″W
- Country: United States
- State: Washington
- County: Island

Area
  - Total: 3.9 sq mi (10.1 km^{2})
  - Land: 3.9 sq mi (10.1 km^{2})
  - Water: 0 sq mi (0.0 km^{2})
- Elevation: 72 ft (22 m)

Population (2020)
  - Total: 2,252
  - Density: 577/sq mi (223/km^{2})
- Time zone: UTC-8 (Pacific (PST))
  - Summer (DST): UTC-7 (PDT)
- ZIP Code: 98249
- Area code(s): 360, 564
- Telephone exchanges: 321, 331, 730
- FIPS code: 53-25510
- GNIS feature ID: 2408260

Freeland is an unincorporated community and census-designated place (CDP) on Whidbey Island in Island County, Washington, United States. At the time of the 2020 census the population was 2,252. The town received its name based on its origins as a socialist commune in the early 1900s: in the eyes of its founders, the land of the town was literally to be free for all people. Some of the first settlers were veterans of a prior experiment in socialism, the nearby Equality Colony.

== History ==
Some Equality Colony dissidents, led by George Washington Daniels, incorporated the Free Land Association in 1900 and established the colony on land they purchased through James P. Gleason of the Fidelity Trust company. Members purchased dividend-paying shares in the association store fund and the machinery fund. The association store operated according to Rochdale Principles, and shares in the store were sold to non-residents as well as association members. Because members could pay for their land with dividends from their shares, the founders considered the land to be "free". By 1902, however, the colony announced that new settlers would have to purchase land outright, as the idealistic land-financing plan based on share dividends had not worked.

Daniels platted five-acre tracts with wide streets to form the original townsite. Additional plats were added over the next several years.

Freeland considered itself a cooperative profit-sharing association and rejected the rigid communal structure of other colonies on the island. They described themselves to the Whidby Islander as "simply a settlement of socialists co-operating on semi-capitalistic principles."

During its early years, Freeland had no local school, sending its children three miles across the island to Useless Bay. The lack of roads contributed to the isolation of the colony, although Daniels' son-in-law, John H. Prather, purchased several boats to provide freight and passenger service between Freeland and Everett, the nearest town on the mainland.

== Geography ==
Freeland is located on the southern part of Whidbey Island. The community sits on a mile-wide isthmus between the south end of Holmes Harbor, a 6-mile-long (9.7 km) inlet of Saratoga Passage, and Mutiny Bay on Admiralty Inlet. It is located on the 48th parallel north.

Washington State Route 525 passes through Freeland, leading east 9 miles (14 km) to Clinton and northwest 12 miles (19 km) to SR 20 at Keystone. Oak Harbor is 28 miles (45 km) north of Freeland via SR 525 and SR 20.

According to the United States Census Bureau, the Freeland CDP has a total area of 3.9 square miles (10.1 km^{2}), all of it land.

== Demographics ==
As of the census of 2000, there were 4,329 people, 785 households, and 652 families residing in the CDP. The population density was 390.4 people per square mile (150.9/km^{2}). There were 664 housing units at an average density of 197.4/sq mi (76.3/km^{2}). The racial makeup of the CDP was 94.4% White, 0.5% African American, 1.0% Native American, 0.8% Asian, 0.1% Pacific Islander, 0.4% from other races, and 2.9% from two or more races. Hispanic or Latino of any race were 2.7% of the population.

There were 561 households, out of which 27.3% had children under the age of 18 living with them, 53.3% were married couples living together, 11.1% had a female householder with no husband present, and 32.4% were non-families. 26.0% of all households were made up of individuals, and 10.7% had someone living alone who was 65 years of age or older. The average household size was 2.34 and the average family size was 2.79.

In the CDP, the population was spread out, with 21.9% under the age of 18, 4.8% from 18 to 24, 28.2% from 25 to 44, 30.2% from 45 to 64, and 14.9% who were 65 years of age or older. The median age was 43 years. For every 100 females, there were 88.6 males. For every 100 females age 18 and over, there were 86.4 males.

The median income for a household in the CDP was $78,409, and the median income for a family was $67,212. Males had a median income of $99,205 versus $75,708 for females. The per capita income for the CDP was $84,968. About 1.1% of families and 2.2% of the population were below the poverty line, including 14.9% of those under age 18 and 6.1% of those age 65 or over.

== Outdoor recreation ==
Double Bluff Beach and State Park is a popular site on the south side of Whidbey Island, 2 miles (3 km) south of Freeland. The beach offers of shellfish harvesting and at times total solitude along the shores of Useless Bay and Admiralty Inlet to the north of the Puget Sound.

South Whidbey State Park, 6 miles (10 km) northwest of Freeland, provides beach access and forested trails through a mixture of second growth and old growth timber.

Freeland Park on Holmes Harbor on the north side of town has beach access, boat ramp, boat moorage, picnic tables, children's playground, and an annual Third of July fireworks celebration.

Holmes Harbor Golf Club is an 18-hole, par 64, public golf course with views of Holmes Harbor.

== Education ==
Almost all of the community is served by the South Whidbey School District. A small piece extends into the boundaries of the Coupeville School District.
