= Puget Group =

Geologic group in Washington state, USA

- Stratigraphic range: Paleogene
- Type: Group
- Sub-units: Tiger Mountain, Tukwila, Renton

Lithology
- Primary: Deltaic
- Other: Marine, Riverine, Volcanic

Location
- Region: King County, Washington
- Country: United States

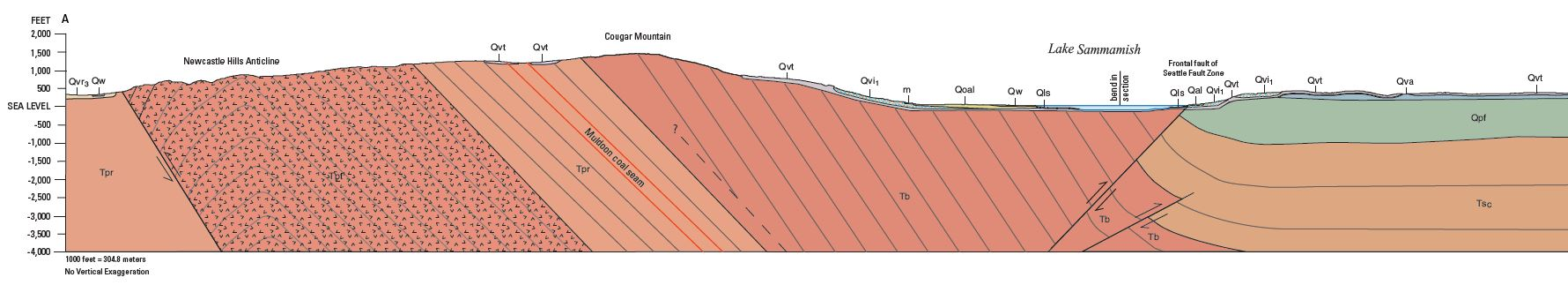
King County Geologic Cross Section

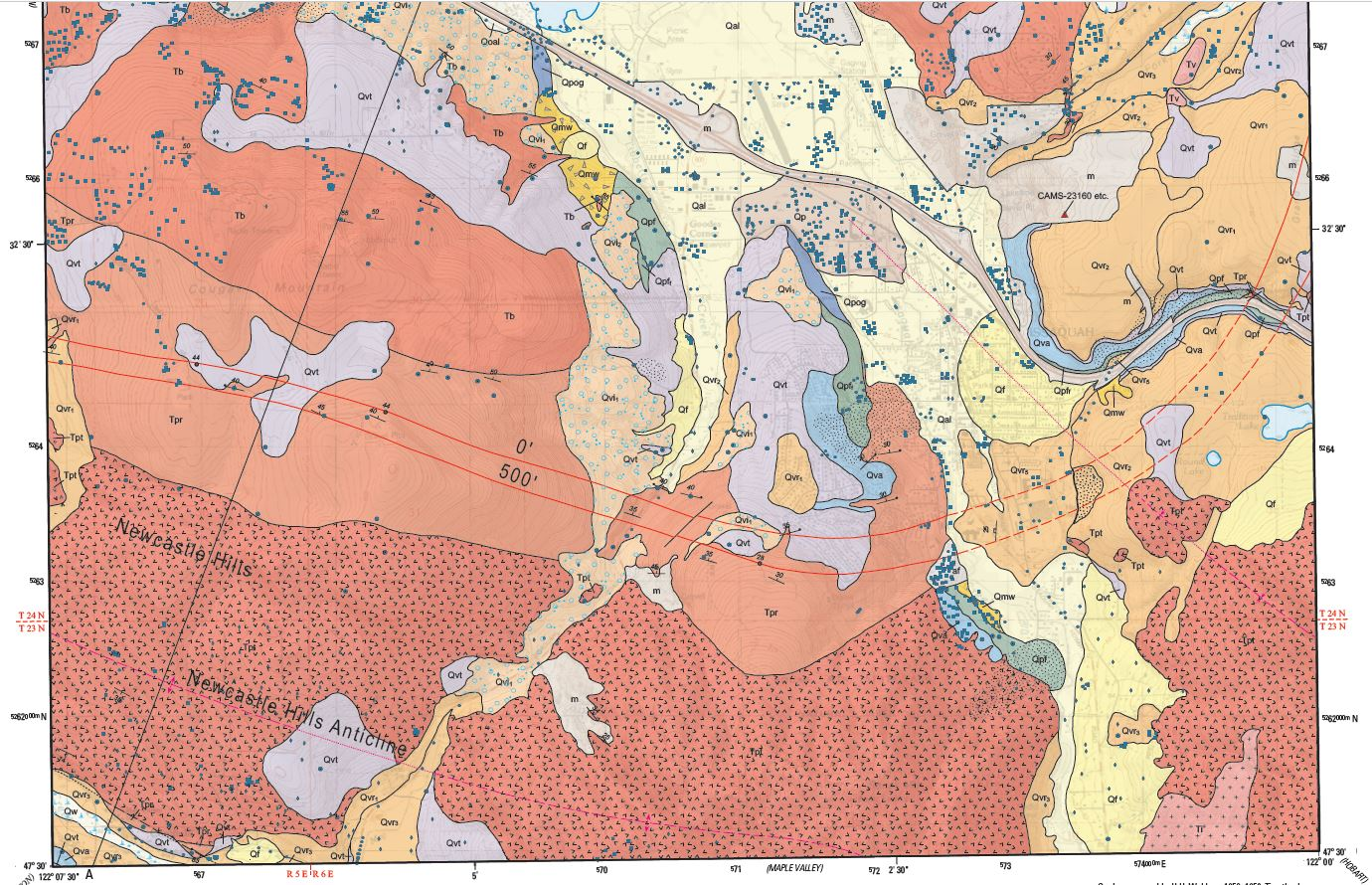
King County Geologic Map

The Puget Group is a geologic group in Washington (state). It preserves fossils dating back to the Paleogene period.

In the northern area of group around Renton, Washington, the Group has been divided into three formations (from oldest to youngest), the Tiger Mountain Formation, the Tukwila Formation, and Renton Formation. Robin Burnham (1994) specifies that these formations have not been defined and extended to Puget Group outcrops to the south within the Green River gorge and all of the Tukwila formation rocks are missing. The Puget Group has been mapped across a total of six western Washington geographic quadrangles.

== Age ==
The total deposition time has been estimated to be as short as approximately 7.7 million years, from around 45 to 36 million years ago based on isotopic data reported in 1993 or as long as 51 to 34 million years ago based on the paleofloristic data of Wolfe (1968, 1977).

== Western North American floral stages ==
The Western North American floras of the Eocene were divided into four floral "stages" by Jack Wolfe (1968) based on work with the Puget Group plant fossils. The four stages, Franklinian, Fultonian, Ravenian, and Kummerian covered the Early Eocene through early Oligocene, and three of the four were given informal early/late substages. Wolfe tentatively deemed the Franklinian as Early Eocene, the Fultonian as Middle Eocene, the Ravenian as Late, and the Kummerian as Early Oligocene. The beginning of the Kummerian was refined by Gregory Retallack et al (2004) as 40 mya, with a refined end at the Eocene-Oligocene boundary where the younger Angoonian floral stage starts.

== See also ==
- List of fossiliferous stratigraphic units in Washington (state)
- Paleontology in Washington (state)
- Various Contributors to the Paleobiology Database. "Fossilworks: Gateway to the Paleobiology Database".
