= Paleontology in Washington (state) =

Paleontological research in the U.S. state of Washington

The location of the state of Washington

Paleontology in Washington encompasses paleontological research occurring within or conducted by people from the U.S. state of Washington. Washington has a rich fossil record spanning almost the entire geologic column. Its fossil record shows an unusually great diversity of preservational types including carbonization, petrifaction, permineralization, molds, and cast. Early Paleozoic Washington would come to be home to creatures like archaeocyathids, brachiopods, bryozoans, cephalopods, corals, and trilobites. While some Mesozoic fossils are known, few dinosaur remains have been found in the state. Only about two-thirds of the state's land mass had come together by the time the Mesozoic ended. In the Cenozoic the state's sea began to withdraw towards the west, while local terrestrial environments were home to a rich variety of trees and insects. Vertebrates would come to include the horse Hipparion, bison, camels, caribou, oreodonts. Later, during the Ice Age, the northern third of the state was covered in glaciers while creatures like bison, caribou, woolly mammoths, mastodons, and rhinoceros roamed elsewhere in the state. The Pleistocene Columbian Mammoth, Mammuthus columbi is the Washington state fossil.

== Prehistory ==
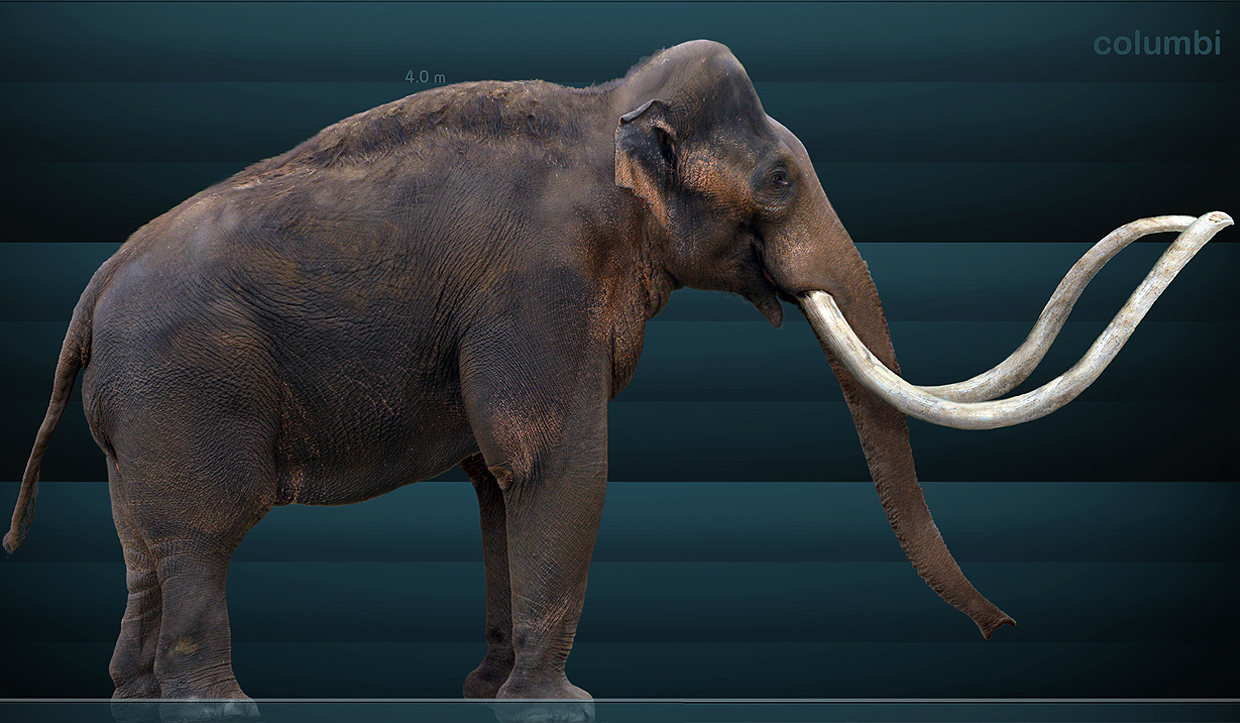
Restoration of a Columbian mammoth

During the Cambrian, Washington was home to archaeocyathids, brachiopods, and trilobites. The archaeocyathids are the oldest known fossils in the state. Graptolites became abundant during the Ordovician period, and their remains were preserved in what are now the rocks of Pend Oreille and Stevens Counties. Possibly during the Silurian, but certainly by the Devonian, brachiopods and corals become the most abundant life forms represented in Washington's fossil record. During the Carboniferous, brachiopods, bryozoans, and corals inhabited. Permian life included corals, fusulinida, and gastropods.

During the early Mesozoic, Triassic pelecypods were common Washington inhabitants. Jurassic and Cretaceous life left behind their fossils in the north-central and northwestern part of Washington. By the end of the Mesozoic only about two-thirds of the state's land mass had come together. During the Cretaceous the regions now occupied by the northern Cascade Mountains and the San Juan Islands were home to creatures like cephalopods with both coiled and uncoiled shells as well as pelecypods. Only one known dinosaur fossil has been found in Washington.

In the Cenozoic the state's sea began to withdraw towards the west. In the mid-Cenozoic volcanic activity started in the Cascade Mountains. The Tertiary seas of Washington were inhabited by creatures like echinoderms, foraminferans, gastropods, pelecypods, and scaphopods. On land, the local flora included Ginkgo, oak, poplar, sequoia, and willow. Terrestrial insects left behind fossils in Spokane and the area west of Latah Creek. Tertiary vertebrates of Washington included the horse Hipparion, bison, camels, caribou, oreodonts, and many different kinds of rodent. Ten million years ago geologic uplift formed the Olympic Mountains. Near the end of the Cenozoic the northern third of Washington was covered by glaciers, as were the peaks of the Cascade and Olympic Mountains. The more recent marine invertebrates of Washington from the Quaternary period were generally adapted to cold climates. These included pelecypods and tube-building worms. Like the states marine invertebrates, its terrestrial vertebrates were adapted to cold climates. These include creatures like bison, caribou, woolly mammoths, mastodons, and rhinoceros.

== History ==
=== Scientific research ===
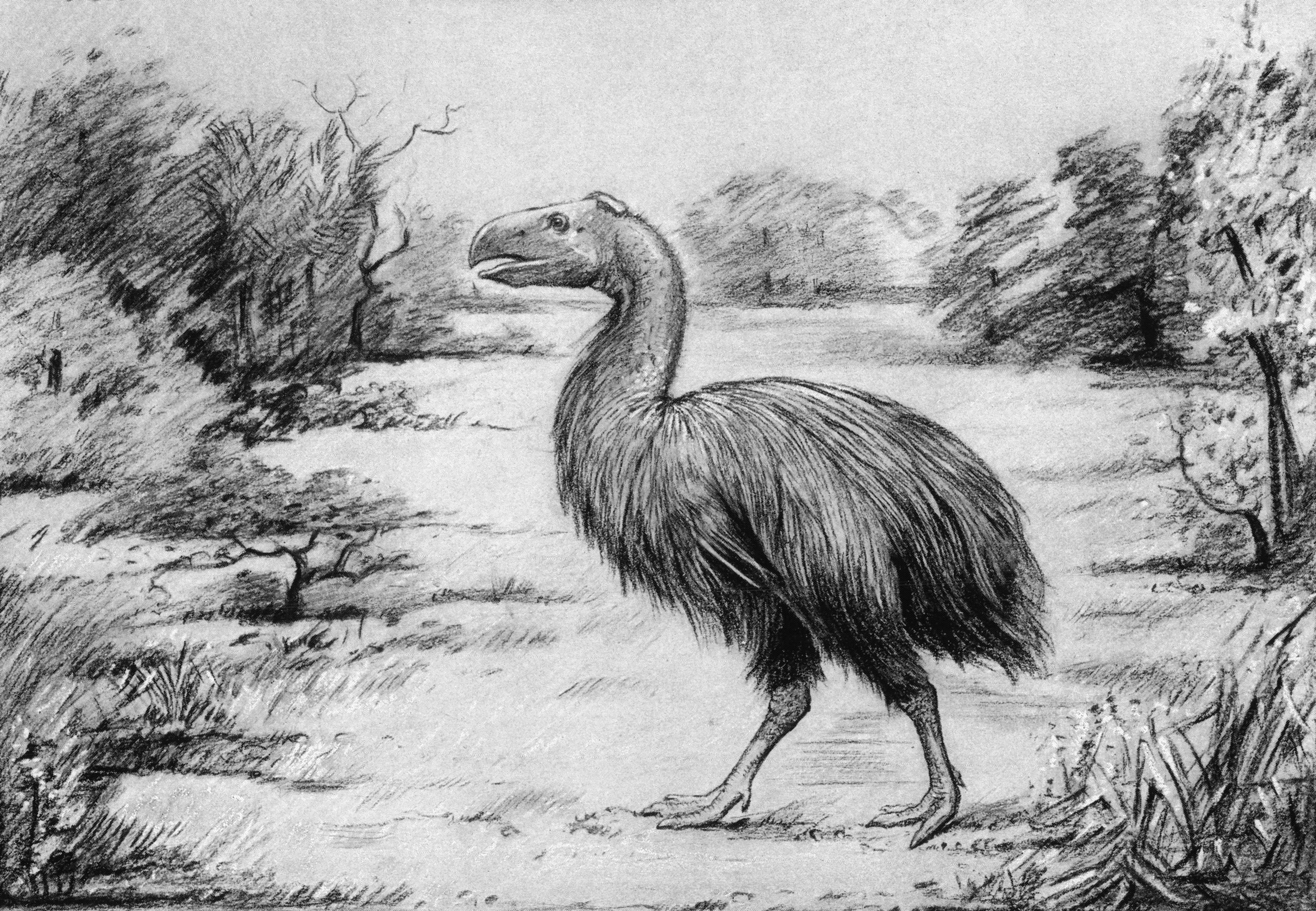
Diatryma.

On May 3, 1992 the Seattle Times ran an article announcing the possible discovery of the first known Diatryma footprint in the Puget Group of Flaming Geyser State Park. The track dated back to the Eocene. A few months later, on July 17, the Times ran another article reporting that Allison Andors and several other experts on Diatryma concluded that the purported fossil footprint of Flaming Geyser State Park was actually a clever hoax. Nevertheless, in ichnologists Martin Lockley and Adrian Hunt's 1999 book on fossil footprints from western North America, the authors concluded that the track was legitimate after all. In 1998, the Pleistocene Columbian Mammoth, Mammuthus columbi was designated the Washington state fossil.

== People ==
=== Births ===
- Kirk Johnson was born in Seattle in 1960.
- Peter Ward was born in Seattle in 1949.
- Wesley C. Wehr was born in Everett on April 17, 1929.

=== Deaths ===
Wesley C. Wehr died in Seattle on April 12, 2004.

== Natural history museums ==
- Burke Museum of Natural History and Culture, Seattle
- Charles R. Conner Museum, Washington State University, Pullman
- Puget Sound Museum of Natural History, Tacoma
- Stonerose Interpretive Center and Fossil Site, Republic

== See also ==
- Paleontology in Idaho
- Paleontology in Oregon
