= Gedney =

Gedney may refer to:

== Places ==
- Gedney, Lincolnshire, a village in England near Boston
- Gedney Island (Washington), a small island in Possession Sound, off of the coast of Everett, Washington

== Other uses ==
- Gedney (surname)
- Gedney Clarke, name of several slave-owners in Barbados
- Gedney family, a family among the original settlers of Salem, Massachusetts
- USC&GS Thomas R. Gedney, originally USCS Thomas R. Gedney, a survey ship in service with the United States Coast Survey from 1875 to 1878 and with the United States Coast and Geodetic Survey from 1878 to 1915
