= Camano–Whidbey ferry =

Defunct ferry route in Washington state

The Camano–Whidbey ferry is a historic and proposed ferry route across Saratoga Passage on Puget Sound linking Camano Island and Whidbey Island, the titular islands of Island County, Washington.

Various historic ferries operated on these waters in the early twentieth century, but the routes were eventually abandoned during the Great Depression. A viable ferry alternative was provided by the construction of the Deception Pass Bridge in 1935 and modern highways (including Interstate 5 and State Route 20) shortening the driving time between the two islands.

No ferry currently services the Camano Island–Whidbey Island route, but a modern passenger-only ferry has been proposed and studied. Although private operators are interested in the route, the main impediment is lack of suitable pier access on Camano Island.

== Island County ==
Island County is composed of two main islands, Whidbey and Camano, which are each connected to the mainland via single bridges.

At its narrowest points, Saratoga Passage between the islands is less than two miles wide. No scheduled ferry route exists between the Island County islands despite the short distance separating them.

In comparison, the driving distance from bridge-to-bridge is 35 miles and involves traversing both Skagit and Snohomish counties. The distance from Coupeville to mid-island Camano is closer to 60 miles.

The lack of ferry service between the islands is a problem for Island County government officials. In 1995, it was established that (depending on season) 8–20 county employees travel daily from the county seat at Coupeville to Camano Island on inter-island business. These county employees each lose three working hours per day commuting, and together cost the county an average of $27,000 per month in wages and travel costs.

Camano Island residents who have been summoned for jury duty or have other business at the Island County Superior Court in Coupeville are likewise forced to make the lengthy commute.

== History ==
In 1925, ferry service began between Utsalady and Oak Harbor on the 16-vehicle Acorn. The car ferry made 12 trips per day between the islands.

In the 1950s the Whidbey–Camano Ferry Association sought to reestablish ferry service between the islands.

In 1962 the Washington State Highway Commission researched the route and reported that ferry service would not be economically feasible. In 1970 the Whidbey–Camano ferry route was again considered by a subcommittee of the Washington State Legislature.

== Modern proposals ==
Island County commissioners sought a passenger ferry between the islands in 1998. The proposed route was from Coupeville to Elger Bay, an 8-mile (13 km) distance that would take around 30 minutes.

In 2001, Washington State Department of Transportation studied new vehicular access routes to Whidbey Island that would provide alternatives to the Deception Pass Bridge. A Camano–Whidbey car ferry was explored as an alternative to proposed bridges over Skagit Bay in the vicinities of La Conner and Fir Island/Conway. This study eliminated the possibility of a vehicle ferry terminal on Camano Island itself "due to the concern over the impacts of ferry related through-traffic and social impacts to existing communities at possible ferry locations." Instead, the vehicle ferry terminal was proposed in the water off Arrowhead Beach at the end of a 5.4-mile (8.7 km) bridge connected to the mainland from northern Stanwood. This study specifically did not examine the feasibility of passenger-only ferry terminals.
