= Gadney =

Gadney is a surname. Notable people with the surname include:

- Reg Gadney (1941–2018), British painter and thriller writer
- Bernard Gadney (1909–2000), English rugby union footballer

== See also ==
- Gedney (surname)
- Gidney
- Gladney
