= Gedney (surname) =

Gedney is a surname. Notable people with the surname include:

- Bartholomew Gedney (c. 1640 – 1698/99), Salem witchcraft trials magistrate
- Chris Gedney (born 1970), American football player
- John B. Gedney (1809–1859), American politician
- Stephen Gedney, American electrical engineer
- William Gedney, American photographer
- William J. Gedney, historical linguist

== See also ==
- Gedney family, a family among the original settlers of Salem, Massachusetts
