= Baby Island Heights, Washington =

Unincorporated community in Washington, US

Baby Island Heights, Washington t̕aq̓tap
- Unincorporated community
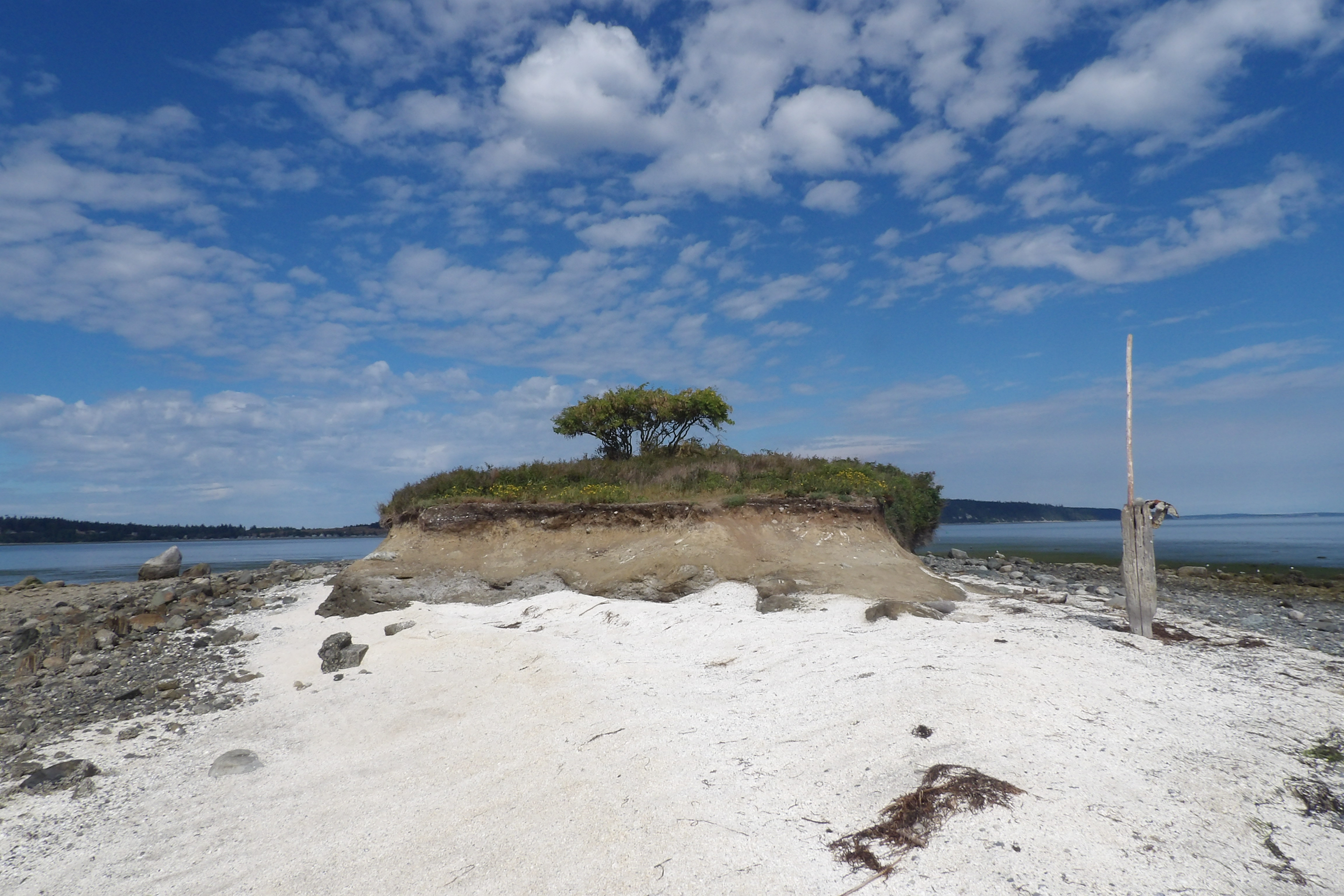
- Baby (Hackney) Island, viewed from the shell midden shoal connecting it to Whidbey Island

- Location within Washington (state) Location within the United States
- Coordinates: 48°05′46″N 122°31′18″W
- Country: United States
- State: Washington
- County: Island
- Established: 1928
- Elevation: 66 ft (20 m)
- Time zone: UTC-8 (Pacific (PST))
  - Summer (DST): UTC-7 (PDT)
- ZIP: 98260
- Area code: 360
- GNIS feature ID: 1511977

Baby Island Heights is a small unincorporated community in Island County, Washington, United States. Platted in 1928, the community is named after a small island offshore called Baby Island or Hackney Island. It is situated on Rocky Point, Whidbey Island, along the shoreline of Holmes Harbor and Saratoga Passage.

== Naming ==
Baby Island Heights is named for Baby Island, which is often listed as Hackney Island on navigational aids. The name "Hackney" is of unknown origin, though former president of the Washington State Historical Society Robert Hitchman has suggested that it was named for an early trader in the area, while the name "Baby Island" was given by later sports fishermen. The island is called q̓ʷəq̓ʷsdukʷ in Lushootseed, meaning 'wrinkled'. Baby Island is a small, heavily eroded islet at the eastern entrance to Holmes Harbor, which opens into the southern stretch of Saratoga Passage in Puget Sound. The island is semi-attached to Whidbey Island by a shell-covered shoal that is impassable except at extremely low tide, and is surrounded by a large eelgrass bed. The island was at least 1 acre (0.40 ha) in size prior to the mid-twentieth century, but continuous erosion due to increased human use and weathering has reduced it to 80 feet (24 m) by 200 feet (61 m). The island has been owned by the Tulalip Tribes since 1993, serving as a gathering place and shellfish harvesting site. The island and the deepwater zone surrounding it are major harbor seal and California sea lion areas, with frequent haul outs and predation by orcas. The ecology of Baby Island is monitored by the Tulalip Shellfish Program.

The community of Baby Island Heights itself is situated on a small promontory called Rocky Point in English and t̕aq̓tap in Lushootseed, meaning 'forestward' or 'away from the beach'.

== History ==
=== Pre-contact and European exploration ===
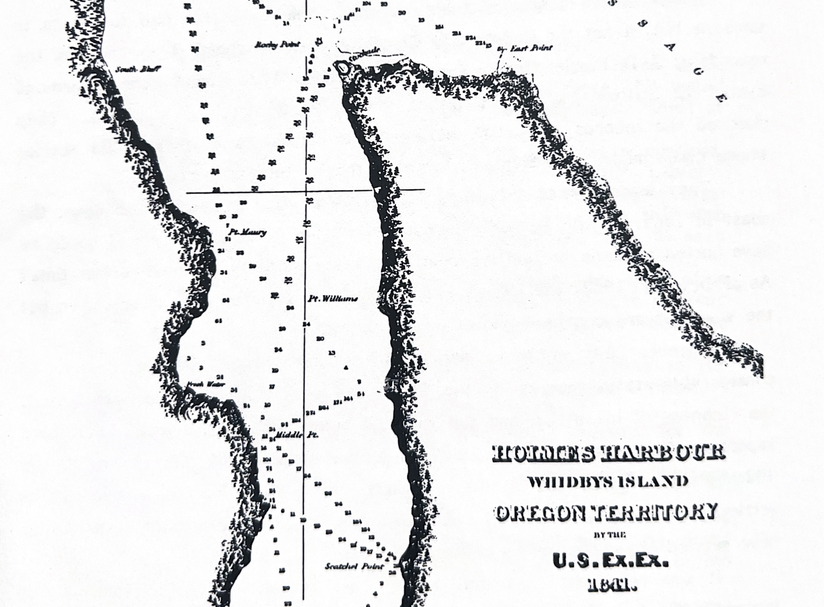
Chart from the Wilkes Expedition showing Rocky Point, Baby Island, and the Snohomish stockades

Archaeological evidence, including shell middens, indicates that Baby Island and mainland Rocky Point were home to seasonal camps of the Snohomish (sduhubš) people, namely the dəgʷasx̌abš ("people of dəgʷasx̌"). In 1841, the United States Exploring Expedition, led by Charles Wilkes, noted the presence of two "good strong and well built" Snohomish stockades, one on the island itself and one on Rocky Point, two of many such fortifications in the Salish Sea and on Whidbey Island in the mid-nineteenth century, primarily serving as defenses from raiding Tlingit and Haida. Despite having been forced to relocate to the Tulalip Reservation by the 1855 Treaty of Point Elliott, Snohomish members of the Tulalip Tribes continued to visit and camp on the island until the 1920s, when fishing camps and resorts were established.

Baby Island was one of four minor islands around Whidbey Island and Camano Island excluded from Island County when the Oregon Territorial Legislature created the county on January 6, 1853, an error maintained by the Washington Territorial Legislature's description of the county boundaries in 1867. This oversight in the Washington Revised Code was finally corrected in 2006 with the passage of Washington HB 2908, sponsored by Rep. Barbara Bailey.

=== Resort boom and decline ===
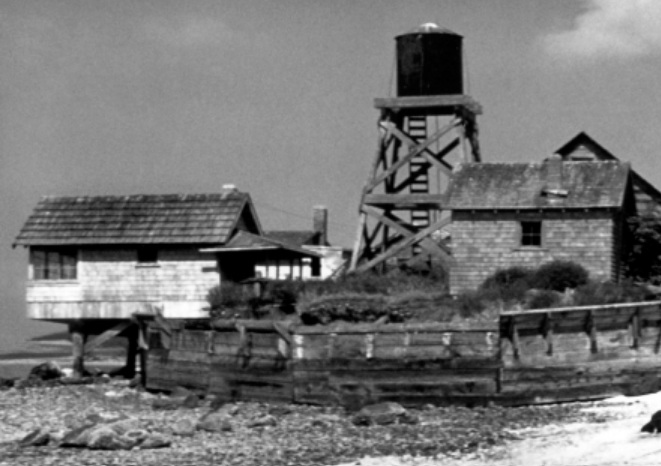
Darrell Scott's fishing camp on Baby Island, ca. 1920s or '30s

In 1919, a Whidbey Island resident named Darell Scott purchased Baby Island when it was over 1 acre (0.40 ha) in size, rising 8 feet (2.4 m) out of the water, covered in wild roses and cherry trees. He was injured off Scotland in the 1918 torpedo attack by SM UB-77 on SS Tuscania during the First World War and chose to retire to his childhood campground on Baby Island. Throughout the 1920s, he built up the island with a fishing lodge, water tower, and cabins for tourists. Before the community of Baby Island Heights itself was platted, the area was a well-known fishing area. In 1924 Scott's Baby Island Resort officially opened to the public. The island was the site of significant bootlegging during the Prohibition era, with rum-runners seeking shelter from the U.S. Coast Guard in the vicinity of the resort. The resort attracted several well-known early-20th-century Seattle outdoorsmen to the Rocky Point area, including Eddie Bauer, who built a cabin on the mainland. The community of Baby Island Heights was officially platted in 1928 with only a rough road connecting it to Saratoga Road. New resorts were opened in the newly-platted community, including Jimmy Remp's, which was purchased by Art Goodfellow, a Seattle banker, the following year. By 1947, the Goodfellow resort had 14 cabins and 40 boats.

During the summer of 1936, the Civilian Conservation Corps created an improved road through the dense forest to the community, greatly improving automobile access to and from Langley. A year later, Scott lost possession of the island in a poker game at the Doghouse Tavern in Langley. The new owner, M. Hoard, constructed a bulkhead in an effort to stave off the constant erosion. The island changed hands several times in the succeeding decades, having been purchased by Dick Creighton, followed by Art Goodfellow of the mainland resort, and lastly by Verne Johnson in 1947. The resort would remain open until 1966.

In 1946, when public electricity was brought to the area, growth on Rocky Point started to increase. Residents created the Baby Island Saratoga Club in 1949, focused on raising money for improvements to Saratoga Road, the local water system, and establish a fire-fighting service. Many of the present-day homes in Baby Island Heights were built between the late 1940s and the early 1970s. A campaign in the mid-1950s sought to establish a state park in the vicinity of Rocky Point. By 1959, the old resort on Baby Island proper was no longer in use, though the original structures remained until 1963, when a group of campers burned them down with an untended campfire. The island changed hands again in 1966, when the parcel containing it and some of the shore was sold to a land developer, who subdivided it. In the early 1970s, the island was struck by a heavy storm, which contributed significantly to the island's erosion and reduction in size. Resorts on the mainland remained open to the public until at least 1979. Also in 1979, the Seattle Times published a call for an ecologist to purchase and save the island from erosion.

On October 8, 1993, the Tulalip Tribes of Marysville purchased Baby Island and its surrounding tidelands and shorelands from an absentee owner residing in San Francisco for around $130,000.

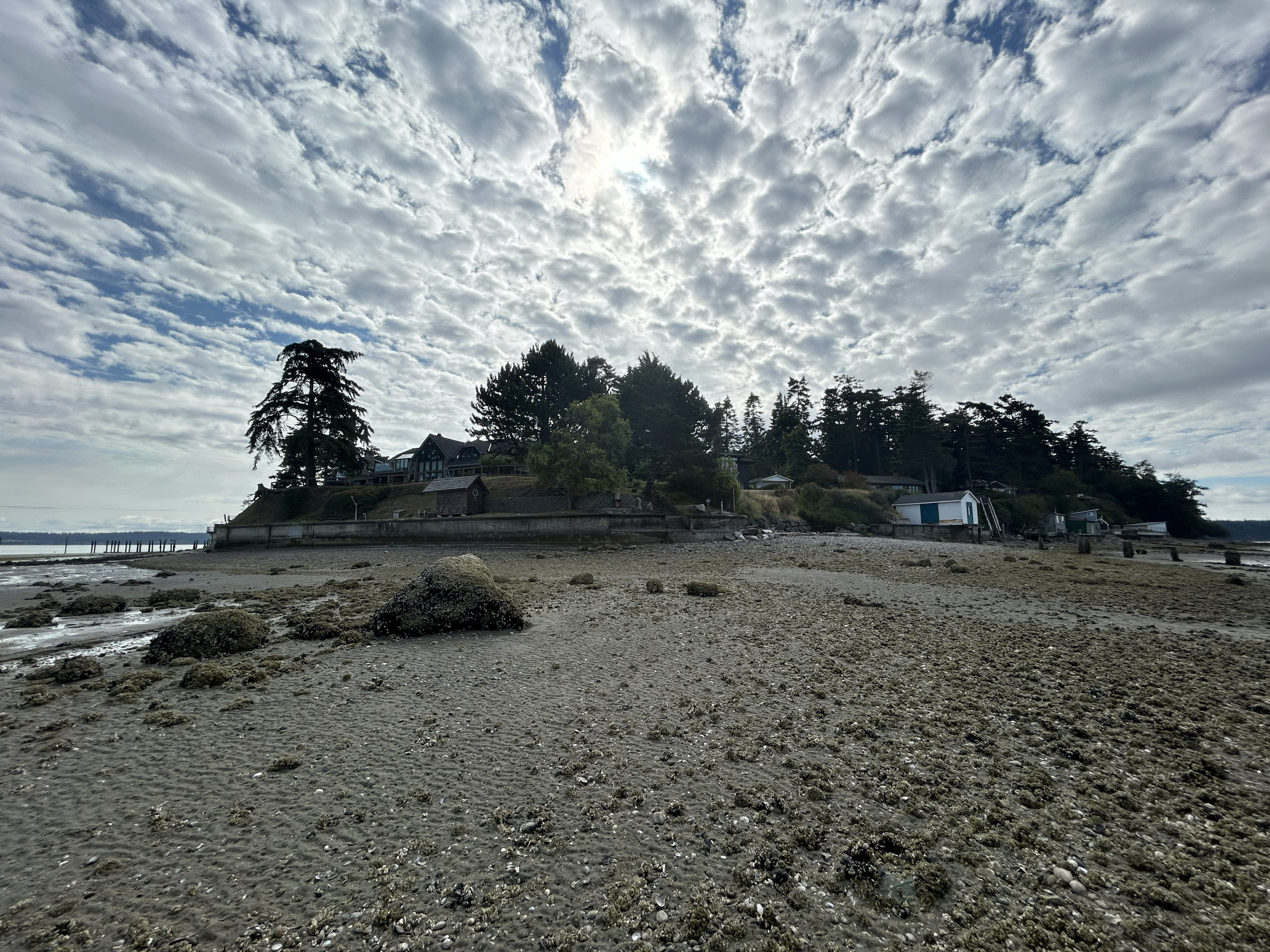
The community viewed from Baby Island

== Present day ==
The community of Baby Island Heights is situated at the junction of Saratoga Road and East Harbor Road. Saratoga Road connects the community to Langley, while East Harbor Road links it to Freeland. It continues to be supported by the Baby Island Saratoga club, with present-day efforts focused on fundraising for education and public safety.

The South Whidbey Historical Society museum in Langley displayed an exhibit on the various historic fishing resorts of Baby Island in 2001. The band Baby Island, formed in 2012 by former members of The Format and LAKE, is named after the island.

In 2021, researchers at the University of Washington found Baby Island Heights to be one of several communities in Island County with racially restrictive covenants dating to the 1930s through 1950s persisting in contemporary documents. Although unenforceable since the Civil Rights Act of 1968, the discovery prompted press coverage and advocacy for their removal.
