= Cama Beach State Park =

State park in the U.S. state of Washington

Cama Beach Historical State Park
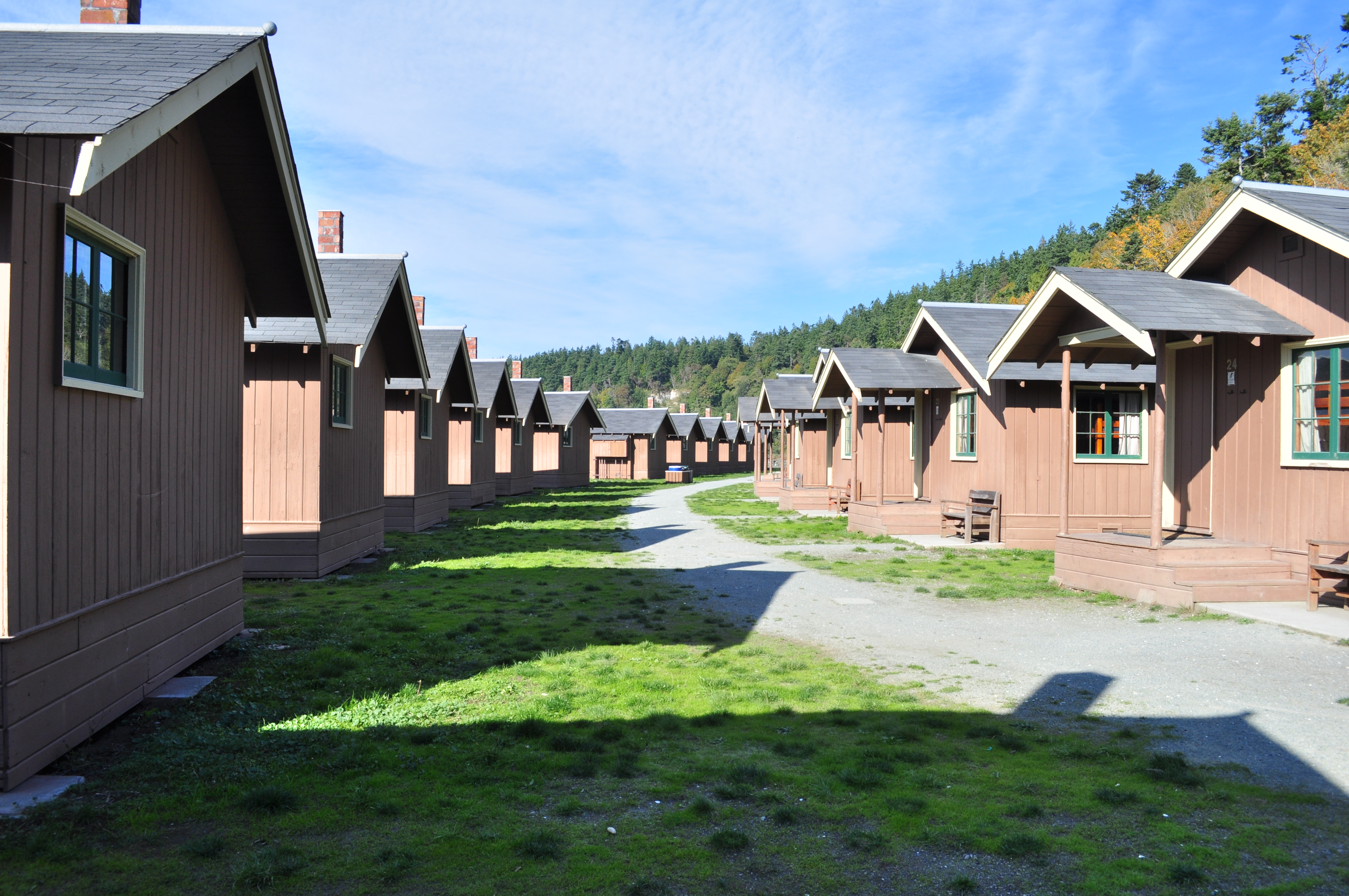

- Location within Washington (state) Location within the United States
- Location: Island County, Washington, United States
- Nearest city: Stanwood, Washington
- Coordinates: 48°08′32″N 122°30′49″W
- Area: 486 acres (197 ha)
- Elevation: 82 ft (25 m)
- Established: 1934-1989
- Administrator: Washington State Parks and Recreation Commission
- Website: Official website
- Cama Beach Resort
- U.S. National Register of Historic Places
- U.S. Historic district
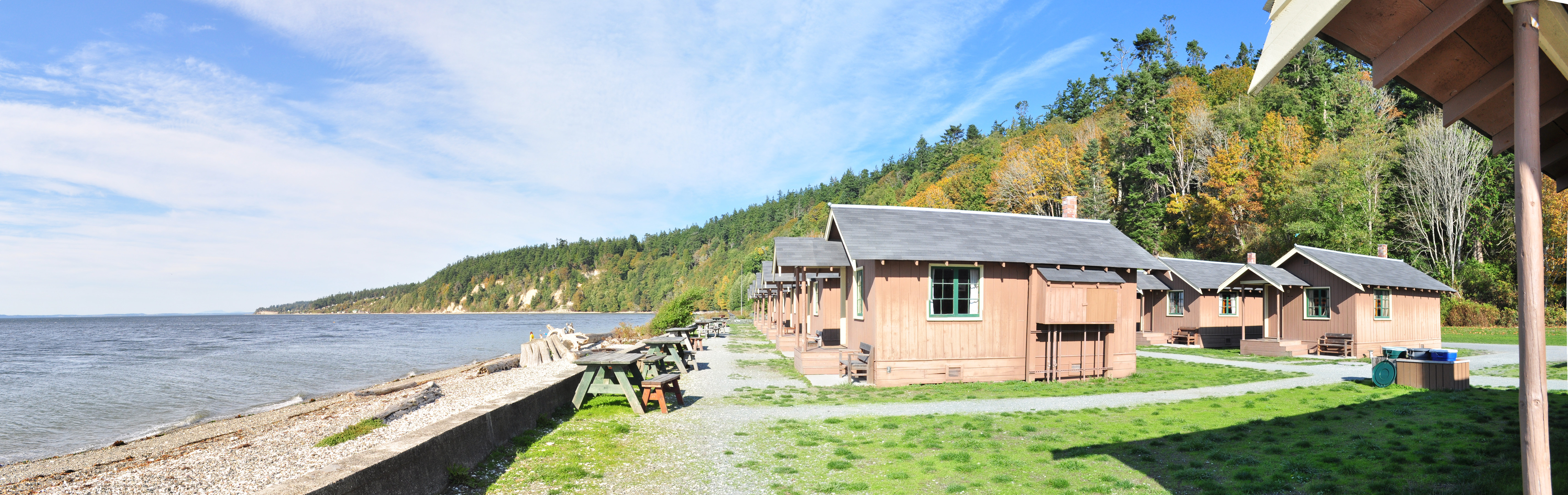
- Cama Beach Resort, October 2013
- Nearest city: Stanwood, Washington
- Area: 38.3 acres (15.5 ha)
- Built: 1934
- Architectural style: Bungalow/craftsman
- NRHP reference No.: 01000505
- Added to NRHP: May 15, 2001

Cama Beach Historical State Park is a public recreation area facing Saratoga Passage on the southwest shore of Camano Island in Island County, Washington. The state park preserves the site of a renovated, modernized 1930s-era auto court and fishing resort.

== History ==
The archaeological record shows that Native Americans were active along the shoreline now known as Cama Beach for thousands of years before the arrival of European settlers. The discovery of human remains and artefacts in the early 21st century threatened to scuttle the creation of a state park at the site. In 1934, LeRoy Stradley opened a fishing resort with some two dozen cabins that could be rented by vacationers at a modest cost. After his death four years later, as many other Camano Island resort properties came and went, Stradley's family continued to operate Cama Beach Resort until 1989. Once closed, Stradley's granddaughters sold the resort, which had fallen into disrepair, to the state of Washington at a fraction of its estimated worth, contributing some of their earnings to the property's rehabilitation.

The state park's 33 cabins closed on February 26, 2024, due to issues with its septic system. The Washington State Parks Commission then proposed a permanent closure of the cabins due to the cost of repairing the septic system and the site's sensitive history. The full closure of the cabins was approved in October 2024 due to the need for a strengthened seawall to protect the area from future king tides and coastal erosion.

== Activities and amenities ==
Park activities include boating, crabbing, scuba diving, fishing, swimming, hiking on 15 miles of trails, wildlife viewing, and horseshoes. A mile-long trail connects the park with Camano Island State Park. The Center for Wooden Boats operates the historic boathouse and shop, offering boat rentals (including boats from the site's days as a fishing resort), youth and adult sailing and boat building classes, and crabbing gear rentals. (Note: Overnight accommodations at Cama Beach previously included two bungalows and 24 waterfront cedar cabins.)
