= Saratoga Passage =

Waterway in Puget Sound, Washington, United States

Coordinates: 48°9′11.7″N 122°32′22.3″W

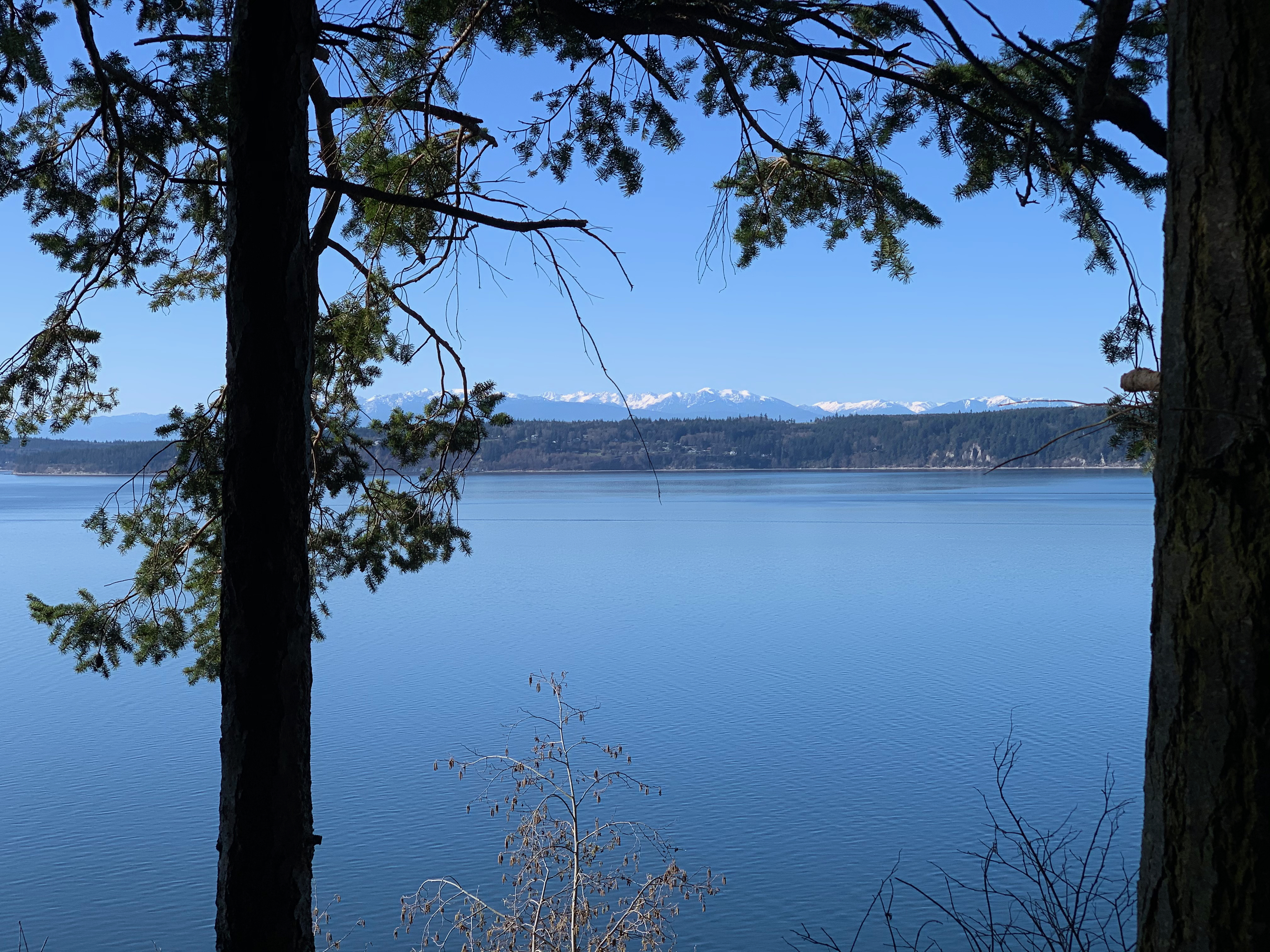
- View west from Camano Island
- Interactive map of Saratoga Passage
- Location: Washington, U.S.
- Type: Channel
- Etymology: USS Saratoga
- Part of: Salish Sea, Puget Sound, Whidbey Basin
- Primary inflows: Possession Sound
- Primary outflows: Skagit Bay
- Max. length: 18 mi (29 km)
- Max. width: 9 mi (14 km)
- Max. depth: 600 ft (180 m)
- Islands: Baby Island
- Sections/sub-basins: Penn Cove, Holmes Harbor, Oak Harbor
- Settlements: Langley

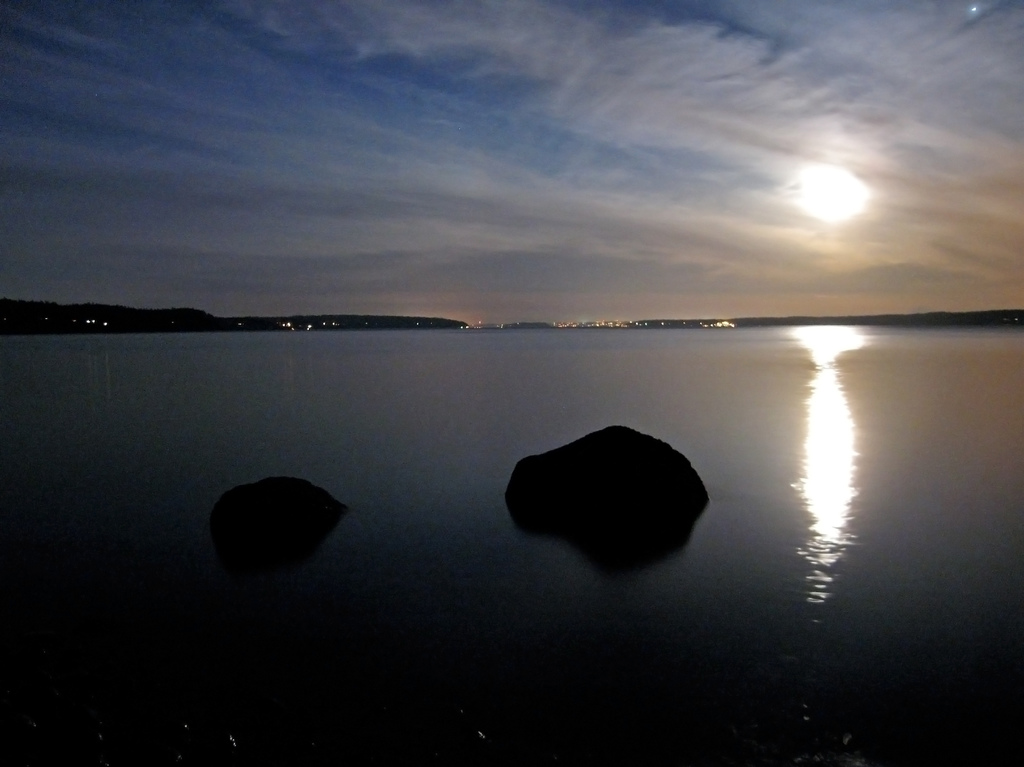
Saratoga Passage at night, as seen from Camano Island, looking southwest.

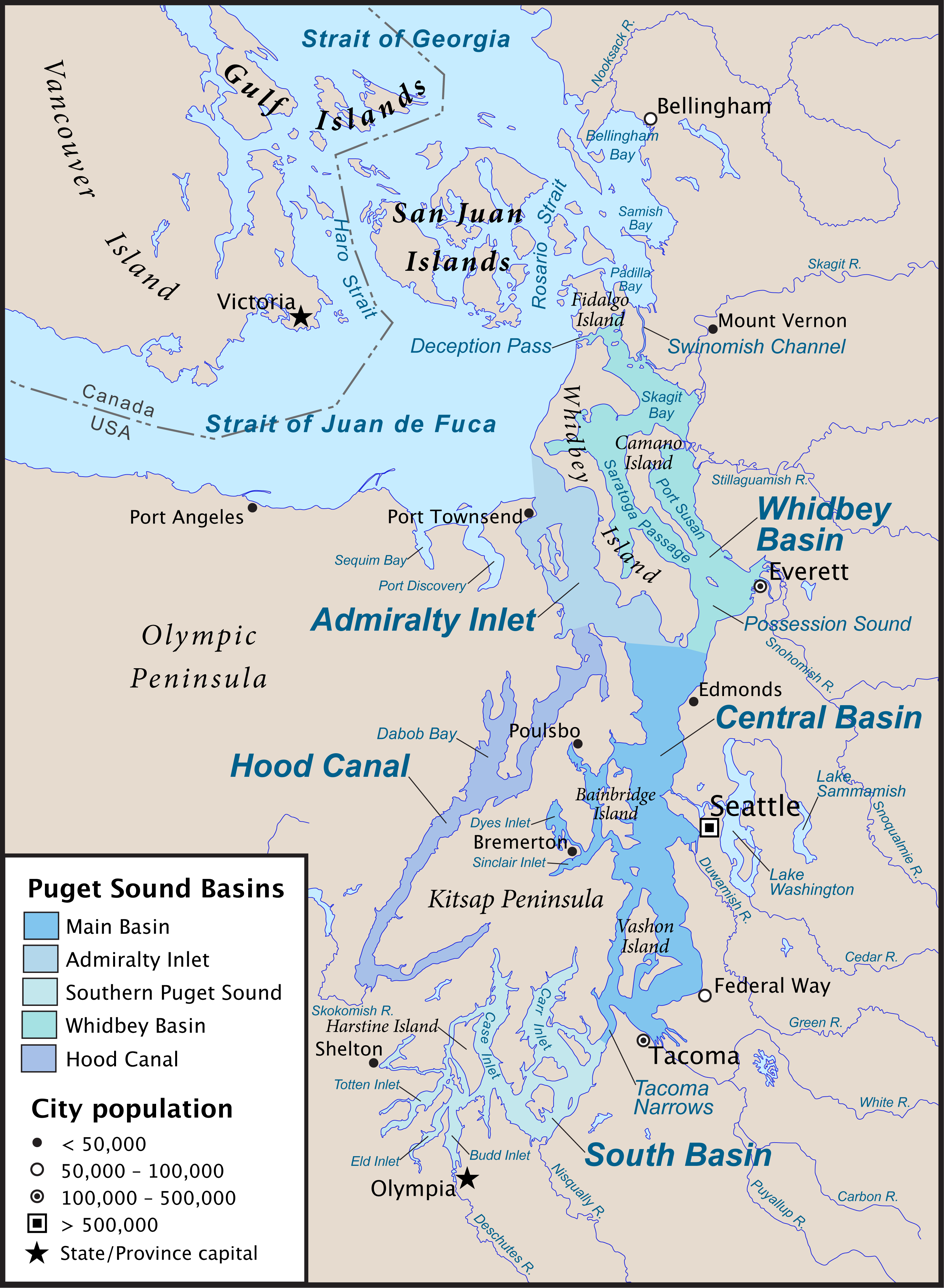
Saratoga Passage is located within the Whidbey Basin.

Saratoga Passage is a major channel of the Salish Sea's Puget Sound, situated between Whidbey Island and Camano Island. As part of the Whidbey Basin, it forms one of Puget Sound's five primary deep basins. It was named in 1841 for the USS Saratoga.

The passage extends 18 miles in a northwesterly direction from its entrance between Sandy Point on Whidbey Island and Camano Head on Camano. At its northern extreme, Saratoga Passage forms Penn Cove and Oak Harbor on Whidbey Island and leads eastward into Skagit Bay between Strawberry Point on Whidbey and Brown Point on Camano. The outflow point is Skagit Bay's Deception Pass.

== Naming ==
Saratoga Passage was named by Charles Wilkes, during the Wilkes Expedition of 1838–1842, for the Saratoga, the flagship of Thomas MacDonough during the Battle of Lake Champlain of the War of 1812. Wilkes had named Camano Island MacDonough Island, to honor the naval commander, but that name was removed when Henry Kellett reorganized the official British Admiralty charts in 1847. Wilkes' name MacDonough was changed to Camano to honor the Spanish explorer Jacinto Caamaño. Wilkes' name Saratoga Passage was retained. George Vancouver had previously, in 1792, named Saratoga Passage "Port Gardner", in honor of Vice-Admiral Sir Alan Gardner. Today the name Port Gardner survives as the bay and harbor of Everett. Port Susan, the water east of Camano Island, also given by Vancouver, survives and honors Lady Gardner, Sir Alan's wife.

== Hydrology ==
The passage extends 18 miles in a northwesterly direction from its entrance between Sandy Point on Whidbey Island and Camano Head on Camano. At its northern extreme, Saratoga Passage forms Penn Cove and Oak Harbor on Whidbey Island and leads eastward into Skagit Bay between Strawberry Point on Whidbey and Brown Point on Camano. The outflow point is Skagit Bay's Deception Pass.

Saratoga Passage was created in the late Pleistocene by the Puget Lobe of the Cordilleran Ice Sheet, carving a deep fjord between present-day Whidbey Island and Camano Island. As the glacier retreated, the passage flooded, creating a channel separating the two islands. While it was termed a "passage" in the 19th century, it is properly called a channel (geography) or a strait hydrologically.

Alongside Port Susan, on the east side of Camano Island, it forms the Whidbey Basin, one of Puget Sound's major deep basins. The other deep basins are Admiralty Inlet, the Main Basin, from Possession Point to Commencement Bay at Tacoma, the basin formed by Hood Canal and Dabob Bay, and South Puget Sound. Saratoga Passage flows into Skagit Bay at its northeeastern end, one of Puget Sound's two principal shallow basins. Depths in the passage are from about 600 feet at the southeastern entrance to about 90 feet near Crescent Harbor. The net outflow of water through Deception Pass is a combination of Skagit River discharge and deep water that enters Skagit Bay from Saratoga Passage.

Most of the waterfront on either side of the channel is high bank of forested sand and clay banks. The beaches are gravel and sand and the tide generally runs out significantly.

== Ecology ==
Dungeness crab, clams and flatfish are abundant. In the past, strong salmon runs passed through on the way to the rivers on the mainland, but they have all but disappeared as have the once plentiful bait of candlefish and herring.

== Settlements and human use ==
Langley, Utsalady, and Greenbank are the primary settlements on the main stretch of Saratoga Passage, but Oak Harbor, San de Fuca, Coupeville, and Freeland are situated on some of its bays and inlets. There are also small, unincorporated low bank communities located on the main stretch of the passage, including Madrona Beach, Sandy Point, Baby Island Heights, Bells Beach, Mabana, and East Point (Fox Spit). The passage lends its name to the small locale called Saratoga Shores on Camano.

Several recreation areas are located on the channel. Camano Island State Park is situated on the island's Lowell Point, with Cama Beach State Historical Park located adjacently to the north on Saratoga's shores. On Whidbey Island, Ebey's Landing National Historical Reserve is located near Coupeville on Penn Cove. The Meerkerk Rhododendron Gardens are situated on a bluff near Greenbank overlooking the channel.

There is considerable maritime traffic through the passage, mostly recreational and fishing boats, with occasional cargo ships and tugboats bound to or from Deception Pass or the Swinomish Channel. High-speed passenger ferries running between Seattle, Victoria and Friday Harbor use Saratoga Passage and Deception Pass as an alternative to crossing the Strait of Juan de Fuca in rough weather.
