= Jack Gunter =

American egg tempera painter

- Education: University of New Hampshire
- Occupation: Artist
- Known for: Egg tempera painting
- Awards: Northwest International Art Competition (1990)
- Website: jackgunterart.com

Jack Gunter (born 1947) is an American self-taught artist and gallery owner from Camano Island in the state of Washington. He attended Bowdoin College and the University of New Hampshire.

His work "A View of Seattle from Pioneer Square" was a winner of the 1990 Northwest International Art Competition and he was commissioned to created the mural Futureville by the Washington State Arts Commission, which was completed in 2010.

The movie theater in Stanwood features a life-sized mural by Gunter depicting a street scene in the pioneer Stillaguamish River town.

== Career ==
Gunter pursued a degree in biology at Bowdoin College and furthered his education with graduate training in organic chemistry. He taught science to junior high school students in Everett, Massachusetts.

In 2022, he was chosen as the featured artist for the Skagit Valley Tulip Festival, with his artwork on the festival's poster and merchandise.

Gunter's studio is located at the south end of Camano Island that also serves as a starting point for the annual Camano Island Studio Tour.
