= Port Susan =

Bay and strait in Puget Sound, Washington, United States

Coordinates: 48.169820°N 122.422931°W

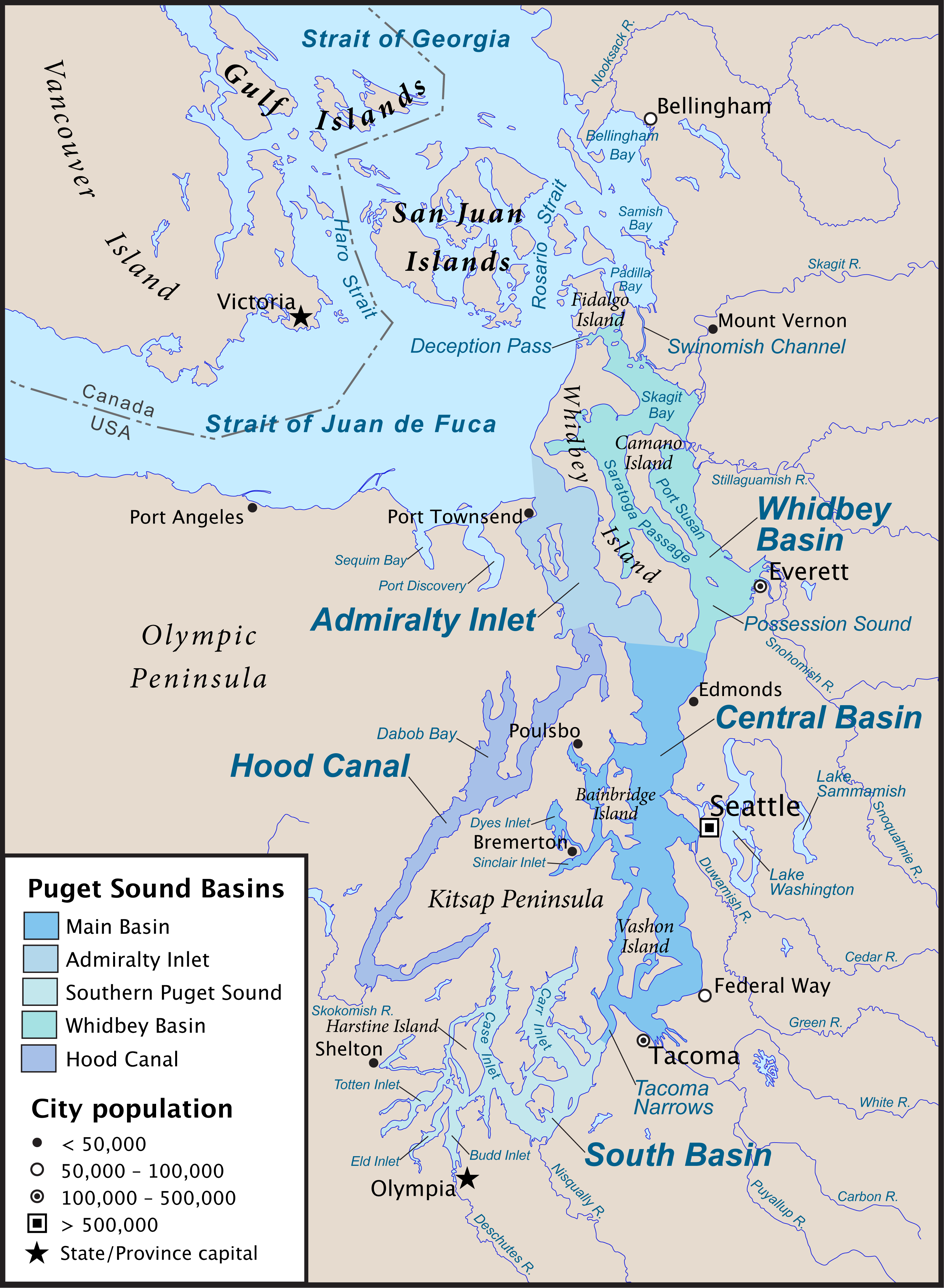
Port Susan is located within the Whidbey Basin

Port Susan is a bay and strait located in the U.S. state of Washington. Part of the Whidbey Island Basin of Puget Sound, Port Susan is bounded by Camano Island to the west and the mainland to the east. The Stillaguamish River empties into the northern end of Port Susan. To the south, Port Susan connects with the rest of Puget Sound via Possession Sound and Saratoga Passage. A swampy waterway connects the northern end of Port Susan with Skagit Bay. This waterway also separates Camano Island from the mainland.

== History ==
In late May and early June 1792 George Vancouver's expedition explored Port Susan and gave it its current name. Most of Port Susan was surveyed by boats under Vancouver's officer Joseph Whidbey. On June 3, 1792, Vancouver held a formal ceremony taking possession of the region for Britain, at which time he named today's Saratoga Passage "Port Gardner", in honor of Vice-Admiral Sir Alan Gardner. He named Port Susan in honor of Lady Susan, Sir Alan's wife.
