= Laurie Z =

American musician

- Born: October 12, 1957
- Origin: Belle Harbor, New York, U.S. Camano Island, Washington, U.S.
- Died: February 9, 2006 (aged 48)
- Genres: Classical, jazz, contemporary
- Occupation: Musician
- Instrument: Piano
- Website: www.lauriez.com

Laurie Zeluck Carter (October 12, 1957 – February 9, 2006) was an American pianist and electronic musician who recorded under the name Laurie Z. Her music is described as a blend of classical, jazz and contemporary instrumental.

== Discography ==
Laurie Z. CD titles include:

- Window to the World
- Life Between The Lines
- Roots, The Solo Piano Album
- Heart of the Holidays
- The Heart’s Journey
- Heart of the Holidays - Bonus Music CD included with Sheryl Roush's book Heart of the Holidays

For Yamaha Disklavier:

- Roots, The Solo Piano Album

Printed Songbook (also in PDF format):

- Roots, The Solo Piano Songbook

== List of solo piano pieces ==
- Stranger in a Familiar Land
- Roots
- Michael’s Song
- The Still of the Night
- In the Monterey Mist
- Invisibility
- For the Love of a Child
- Too Blue
- The Mysterious Painter
- The River
- From the Ashes
- Kelly's Garden
- Dream Come True
- Good Night, My Friend
- My Perfect Love
- Sunrise
- Heart of the Holidays
- Warmth From Within
- Common Ground
- Who Knew
- Cheyenne
- Portrait
- ParaSailing (Unreleased)
- Lost & Found (Unreleased)
- Surfer Steve
- With A Twinkle In Her Eye
- Lullaby for Matthew

== Career and recognition ==
Laurie Z. toured extensively and opened for instrumentalists like Herbie Hancock, Leo Kottke and Tim Weisburg and she performed at major clubs Troubadour and Roxy. Laurie Z. also played national tours for Alesis and Yamaha and represented Roland and Kawai products. She regularly performed and demonstrated products at the NAMM Show, CES, COMDEX and Atari conventions and in 2007 was honored in NAMM's annual tribute.

Laurie Z. concerts were frequently mentioned as a 'Top Pick' in the Los Angeles Times. She could be heard performing regularly at Nordstrom, South Bay Galleria, playing solo piano at the Manhattan Country Club in Manhattan Beach and performing around the South Bay as bandleader for the Z Three Trio and Laurie Z. Band. From 1989 to 1994 Laurie played Disneyland's Tomorrowland Terrace in the rock group Voyager, and was the featured keyboardist at the Anaheim Pond for the Mighty Ducks professional hockey team's inaugural season. Beginning in 1991, Laurie Z. became the featured pianist for Peterbilt Motors at the International Trucking Show, performing for Peterbilt for over a decade. Her television music appearances included Fame, the Disney Cable Network and DirecTV's "InTune."

During the 1980s, before going solo, Laurie recorded for Malcolm Cecil – inventor of the unique TONTO synthesizer – who had a company, EMPH Inc., (Electronic Music Publishing House). EMPH, Inc. released the very first MIDI recording and playback software (MIDIPLAY) for the now obsolete Atari 1040 computer. Laurie recorded MIDI versions of songs for that program which were sold as "Musidiscs." Only three Musidiscs were ever released - Beatles songs, Christmas music and some Grammy winning songs from 1986, and Laurie Z. recorded on all of them.

Launching her own Independent record label, Zebra Productions, Laurie Z. produced her first album Window To The World. Her second release Life Between The Lines was named "New Age Album of the Year" by Scott Brodie of CHRW-FM, Canada. Roots, The Solo Piano Album was recorded live on the Yamaha Disclavier Acoustic Piano and was considered for eight Grammy nominations. Heart of the Holidays included special guest, actor Jack Palance, narrating 'The Night Before Christmas.' The Heart’s Journey, a relaxation program presented by hypnotherapist Ron Stubbs, with music composed and performed by Laurie Z., was considered for seven Grammy nominations.
