= Possession Sound =

Region of Puget Sound, Washington, United States

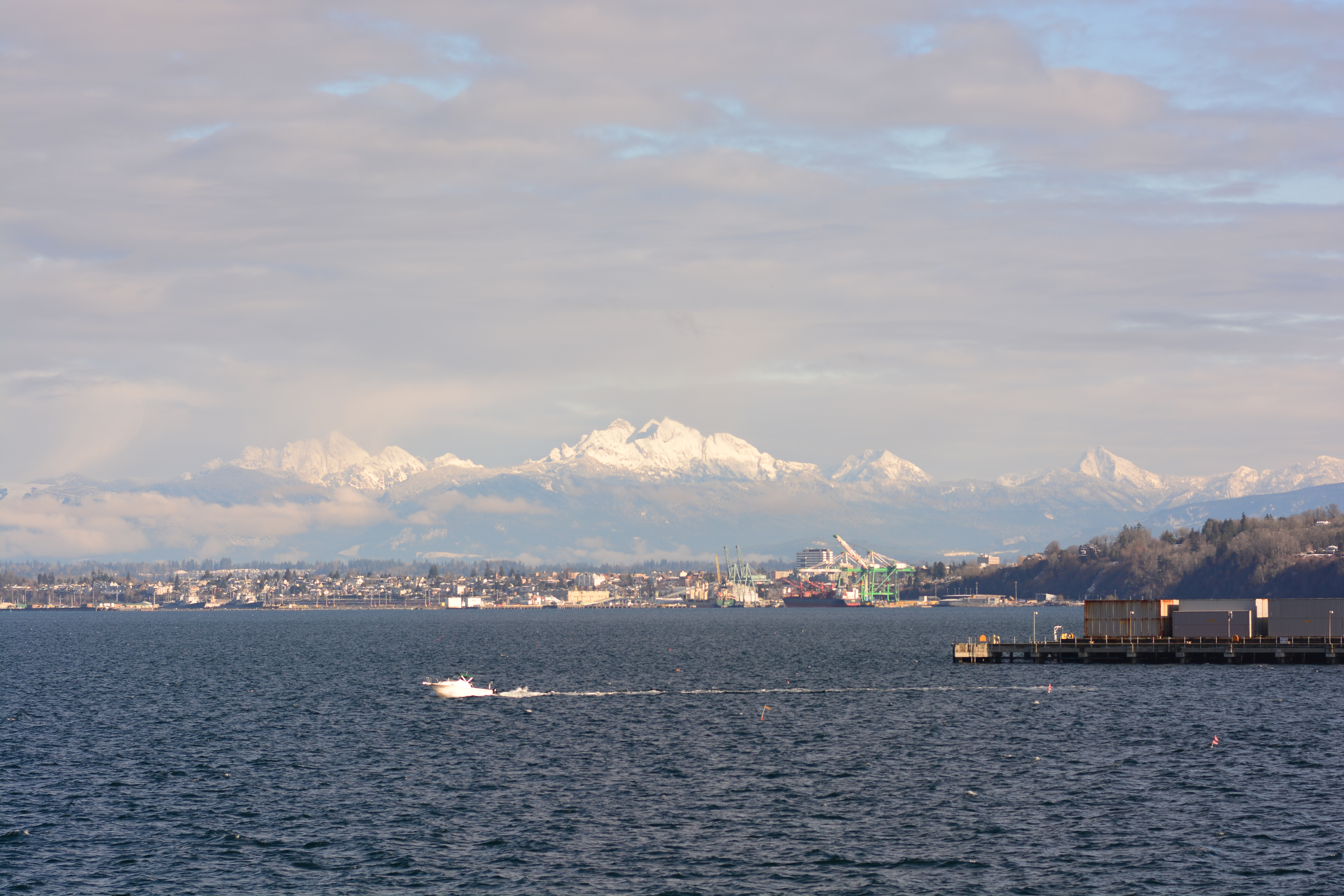
- Everett, WA and the mountains behind, seen looking east across Possession Sound

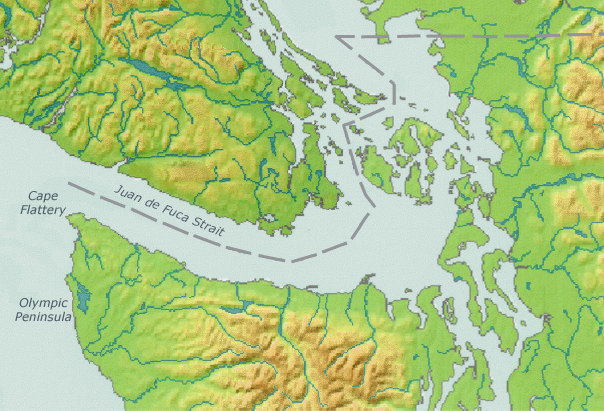
- Location within Strait of Juan de Fuca Location within Washington (state)

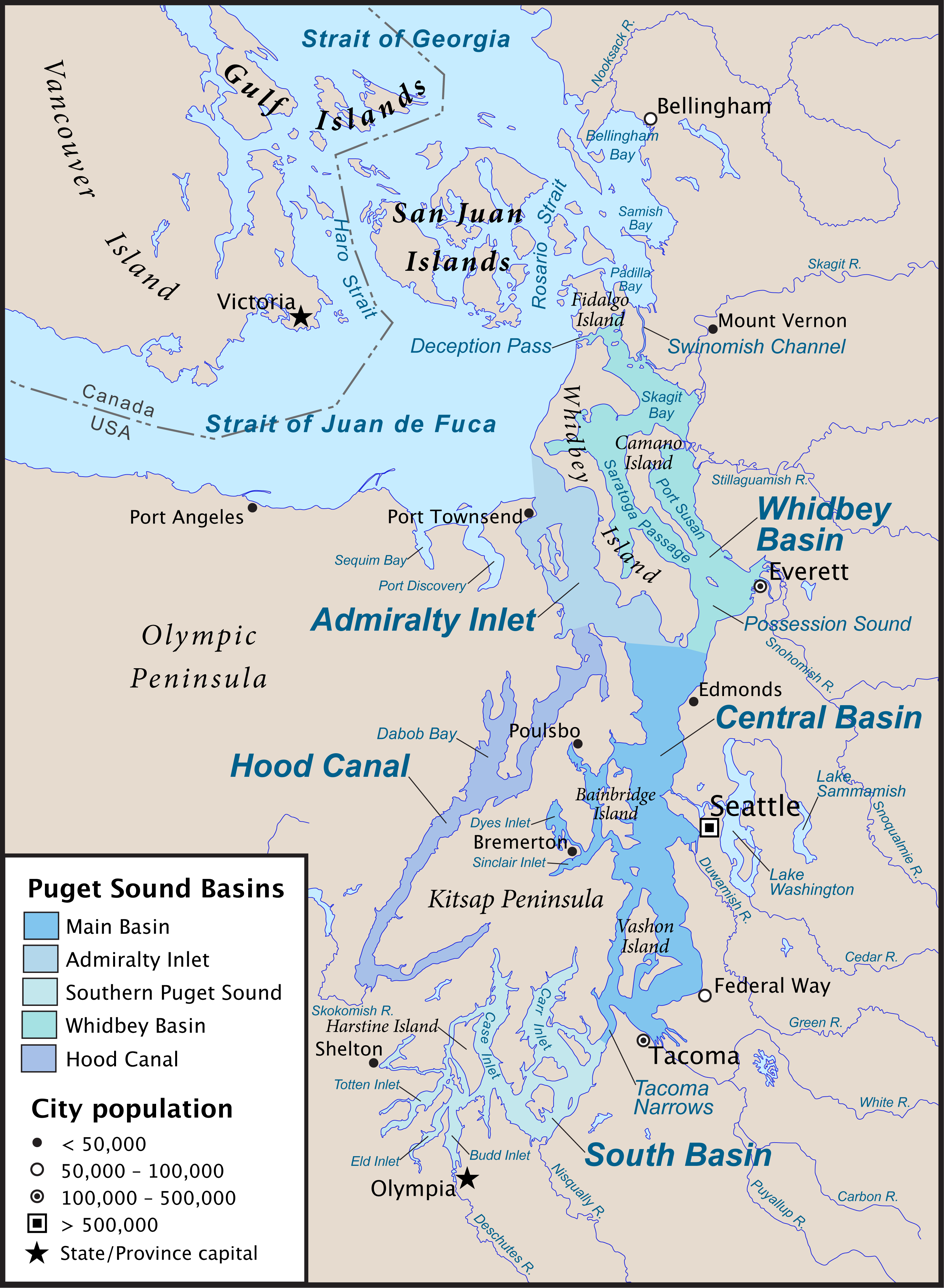
- Possession Sound is located within the Whidbey Basin
- Coordinates: 48°0′40″N 122°14′29″W
- Type: Sound
- Part of: Puget Sound
- Primary inflows: Snohomish River
- Islands: Camano Island, Hat Island
- Settlements: Everett, Mukilteo

Possession Sound is part of Puget Sound, located in the U.S. state of Washington between Whidbey Island and the shoreline of Snohomish County approximately between the cities of Everett and Mukilteo. Possession Sound connects the main Puget Sound basin to the south with Saratoga Passage and Port Susan to the north. The Snohomish River flows into Possession Sound at Port Gardner Bay. Gedney Island, also called Hat Island, is located in Possession Sound.

== History ==
Possession Sound was named by George Vancouver. On June 3, 1792, Vancouver landed near the present site of Everett and celebrated the birthday of George III by holding a ceremony claiming possession of the land of "New Georgia" for Britain. Due to his circumnavigation of the world, Vancouver's dates are off by one. June 3 was, by his reckoning, June 4, the king's birthday. His possession ceremony also involved the naming of Possession Sound, Port Gardner, Port Susan, and the Gulf of Georgia.

In 1825, a large piece of the southern tip of Camano Island slid into Possession Sound—an event known as the Great Slide. A resultant tsunami from the slide drowned many Indian residents of nearby Hat Island. After that, the Tulalip Indians used the site only for seasonal clamming.

== Transportation ==
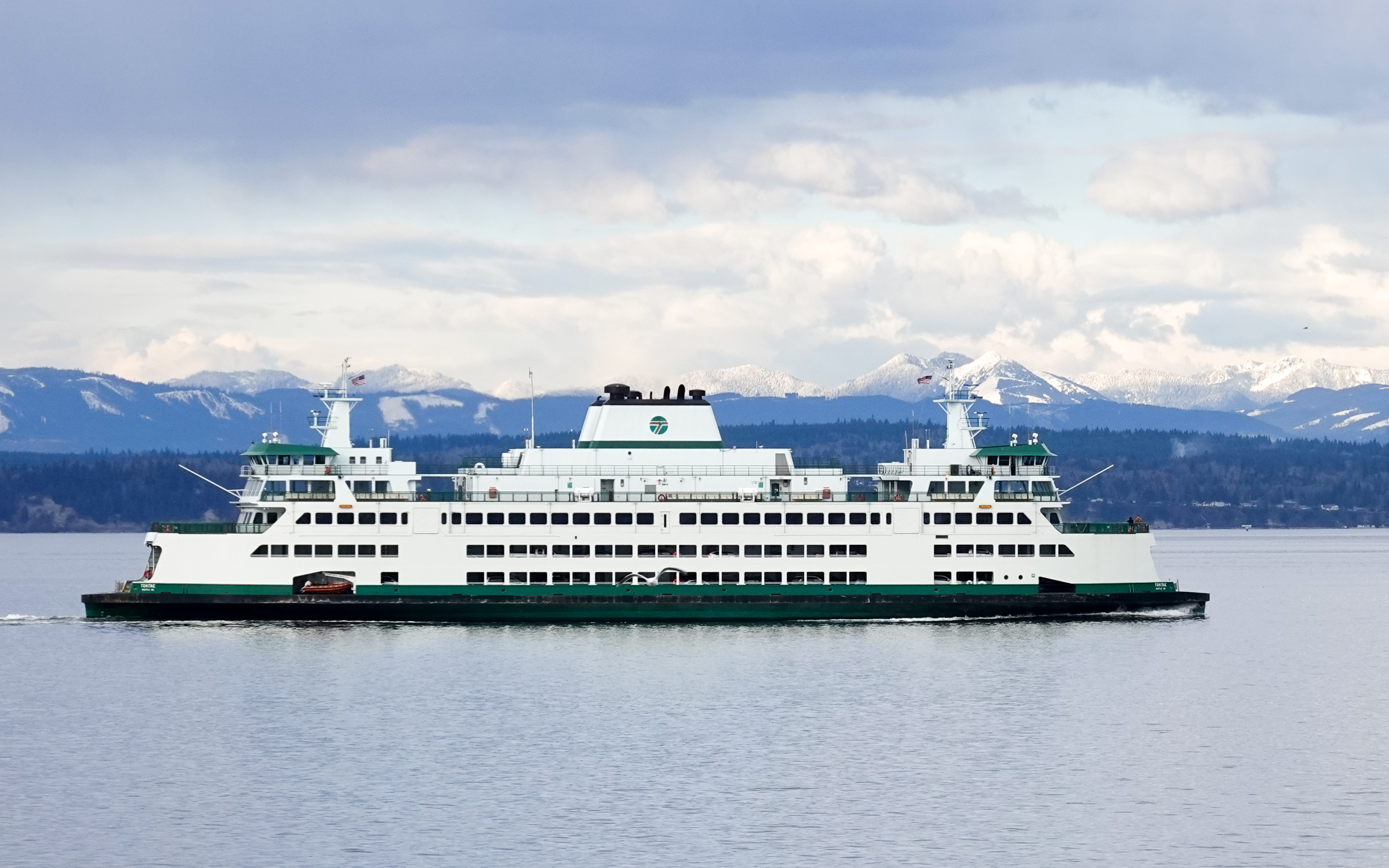
Ferry Tokitae crossing the Sound

The Washington State Ferries (WSF) is a state-run ferry system that connects Whidbey Island to Mukilteo on the Washington mainland, plying across the Possession Sound. Its vessels carry both passengers and vehicular traffic. The Washington State Route 525, Mukilteo-Clinton passenger ferry run crosses the narrowest section of Possession Sound.
