= Hat Island, Washington =

CDP and Island in Puget Sound

Hat Island, Washington č̓əč̓əsəliʔ
- CDP
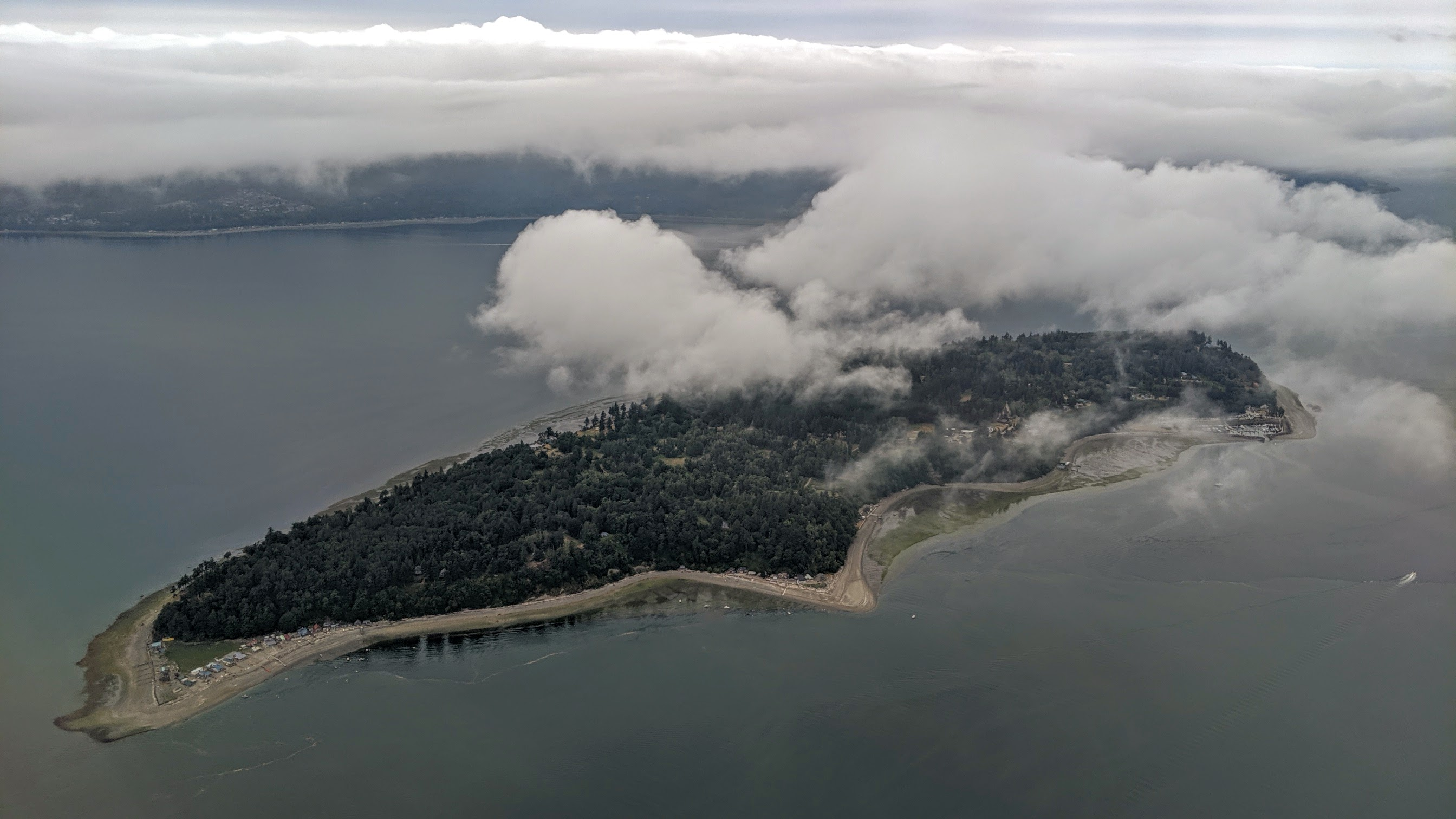
- Hat Island aerial view from the east

- Location of Hat Island, Washington.
- Coordinates: 48°0′48″N 122°19′14″W
- Country: United States
- State: Washington
- County: Snohomish

Area
  - Total: 0.69 sq mi (1.79 km^{2})
  - Land: 0.69 sq mi (1.78 km^{2})
  - Water: 0.0039 sq mi (0.01 km^{2})
- Elevation: 207 ft (63 m)

Population (2020)
  - Total: 91
  - Density: 38/sq mi (14.6/km^{2})
- Time zone: UTC-8 (Pacific (PST))
  - Summer (DST): UTC-7 (PDT)
- ZIP Code: 98201
- Area code(s): 360, 564
- GNIS feature ID: 2584980

Hat Island (Lushootseed: č̓əč̓əsəliʔ), also known as Gedney Island, is a small island in Possession Sound in the U.S. state of Washington. The island is covered by a census-designated place (CDP) that is part of Snohomish County. The population is 26 as of 2025. The island lies between the mainland city of Everett, Washington, and the southern part of Whidbey Island; it has a land area of 1.768 km^{2} (436.8 acres).

== History ==
For thousands of years, Hat Island (known as č̓əč̓əsəliʔ in the Lushootseed language) was the site of a village of the Snohomish people. Their territory extended over the Snohomish River, as well as parts of Camano and Whidbey islands. The village was located on the north side of the island on a spit, near a spring. There were several longhouses.

Hat Island was first mentioned in the historical record by naturalist Archibald Menzies of the Vancouver Expedition in 1792. In the 1820s, a large landslide at Camano Head created a tidal wave which crashed into Hat Island. The wave wiped out the village, save for a few survivors. From that point on, the island was only used by the Snohomish as a temporary camping ground when clamming, never as a permanent living site. People who returned occasionally found human remains or parts of the destroyed village.

The island was named in English by Charles Wilkes in 1841; although other sources say it was for John B. Gedney or Jonathon Haight Gedney, Wilkes's memoirs say he named it for Lt Thomas R. Gedney. The name Hat is for the shape of a beach and treeless ledge, first used in 1870. Since 1980 the island would be called Gedney Island (Hat).

There is currently one walk-on ferry named the Hat Express which transports walk-on passengers to and from the island. The maximum capacity of the ferry is 88 passengers. It runs a limited schedule on Thursdays, Friday evenings, and weekends between the Everett Yacht Club on the west end of 13th Street in Everett, and the Hat Island Marina.

== Geography ==
According to the United States Census Bureau, the CDP has a total area of 0.692 square miles (1.79 km^{2}), of which, 0.688 square miles (1.78 km^{2}) of it is land and 0.004 square miles (0.01 km^{2}) of it (0.58%) is water.

Hat Island is also the name of an uninhabited island in Padilla Bay, Skagit County.

== Demographics ==
Historical population
Census	Pop.	Note	%±
2010	41		—
2020	91		122.0%
U.S. Decennial Census; 2000 2010

Hat Island first appeared as a census designated place in the 2010 U.S. census.

=== Racial and ethnic composition ===
Hat Island CDP, Washington – Racial and ethnic composition Note: the US Census treats Hispanic/Latino as an ethnic category. This table excludes Latinos from the racial categories and assigns them to a separate category. Hispanics/Latinos may be of any race.
Race / Ethnicity (NH = Non-Hispanic)	Pop 2010	Pop 2020	% 2010	% 2020
White alone (NH)	40	82	97.56%	90.11%
Black or African American alone (NH)	0	0	0.00%	0.00%
Native American or Alaska Native alone (NH)	1	0	2.44%	0.00%
Asian alone (NH)	0	0	0.00%	0.00%
Native Hawaiian or Pacific Islander alone (NH)	0	0	0.00%	0.00%
Other race alone (NH)	0	0	0.00%	0.00%
Mixed race or Multiracial (NH)	0	7	0.00%	7.69%
Hispanic or Latino (any race)	0	2	0.00%	2.20%
Total	41	91	100.00%	100.00%

== Parks and recreation ==
Hat Island has a marina with 127 slips and a golf course, both maintained by the Hat Island Community Association.

== Education ==
The community is served by the Mukilteo School District.
