= Bartholomew Gedney =

Bartholomew Gedney (June 14, 1640 – February 28, 1698) was a merchant, physician, military officer, and native of Salem, Massachusetts Bay Colony. He is best known as one of the magistrates in the Salem witchcraft trials.

== Life ==
Bartholomew Gedney was born in Salem in the Massachusetts Bay Colony. His father, John Gedney, was one of Salem's founders and leading citizens, and Bartholomew followed in his father's footsteps. He served as a selectman of the town, and was involved in the local militia, rising to the rank of colonel. He was offered command of an expedition against Port Royal, Acadia, in 1690, but refused.

In 1674, while a resident of Yarmouth, Maine, he went into business with Englishman Henry Sayward. They built the town's first grist mill at the First Falls. He also built two sawmills.

Gedney was present at several of the examinations and later served as a member of the Court of Oyer and Terminer. He was present at the examination of his friend John Alden on May 31, 1692, in Salem Village. When Gedney saw how the afflicted girls cried out that Alden tormented them, he told Alden that he had "always look'd upon him to be an honest Man, but now he did see cause to alter his judgment." Alden generously replied that he was sorry for that and hoped in time to recover Gedney's good opinion; the following year Alden, who had escaped from prison and fled, possibly to Duxbury and was declared innocent by proclamation.

The Gedney House, which still stands in Salem, was constructed by his brother Eleazar.
