= John B. Gedney =

American politician (1809–1859)

New York State Prison Inspector
- In office January 1, 1848 – December 31, 1848

Personal details
- Born: John Benjamin Gedney; June 4, 1809
- Died: 1859 (aged 49–50)
- Party: Whig
- Spouse: Ann McFarquhar
- Relatives: Gedney family
- Occupation: Politician

John Benjamin Gedney (June 4, 1809 – 1859) was an American politician from New York.

== Life ==
He was a member of the Gedney family, and lived at White Plains, Westchester County, New York. He married Ann McFarquhar (d. 1890).

He was one of the first three Inspectors of State Prisons elected on the Whig ticket in 1847 under the New York State Constitution of 1846, and drew the one-year term, being in office in 1848.

== Sources ==
- Gedney genealogy, at RootsWeb
- The New York Civil List compiled by Franklin Benjamin Hough (page 45; Weed, Parsons and Co., 1858)
- His wife's death notice, in NYT on October 16, 1890
