= Gedney and Cox Houses =

Historic houses in Massachusetts, United States

- U.S. National Register of Historic Places
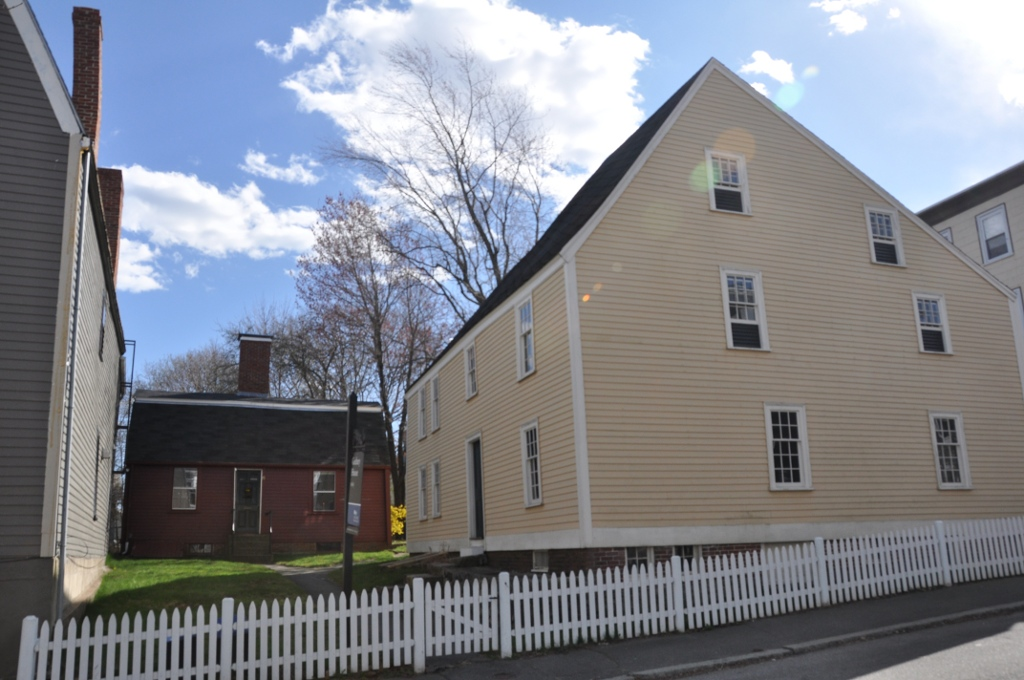
- Gedney House on the right, Cox House on the left

- Location within Massachusetts Location within the United States
- Location: Salem, Massachusetts
- Coordinates: 42°31′6″N 70°53′53″W
- Built: 1665
- NRHP reference No.: 74000389
- Added to NRHP: October 1, 1974

The Gedney and Cox Houses are historic houses at 21 High Street in Salem, Massachusetts. The earliest part of the Gedney House was built c. 1665, and the houses were added to the National Register of Historic Places in 1974. They are owned by Historic New England, which offers limited tours.

== Gedney House ==
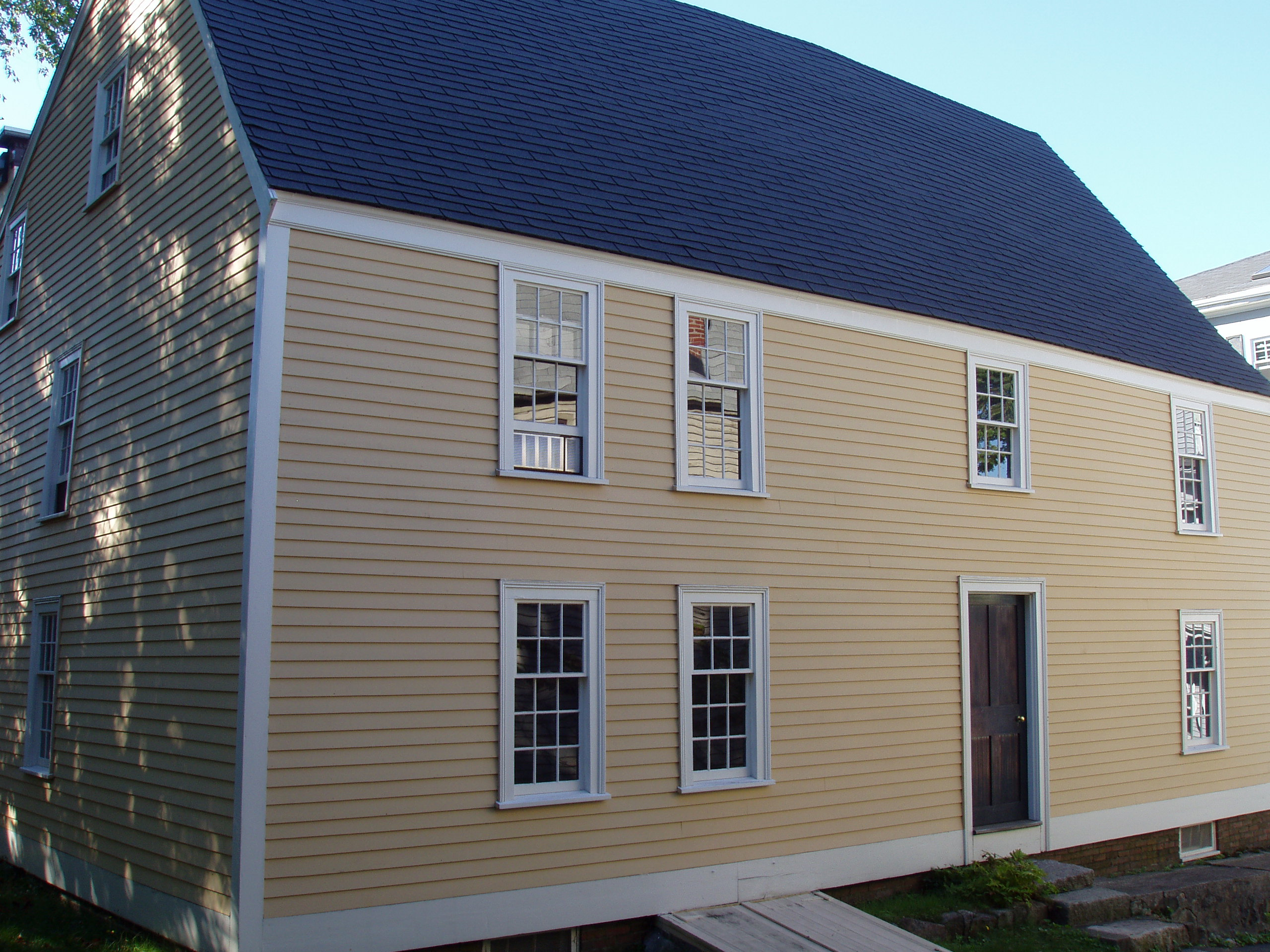
Gedney House, exterior view.

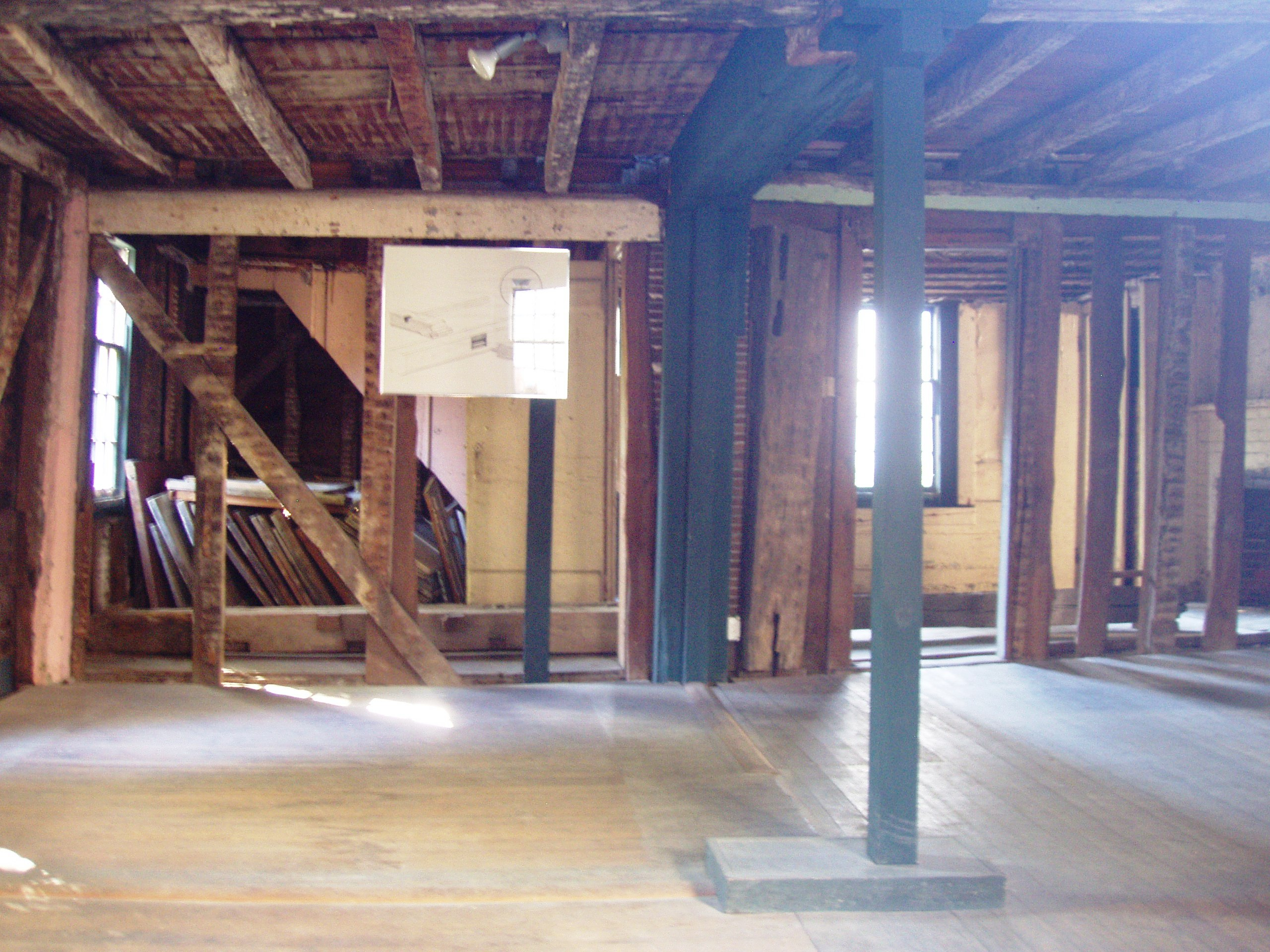
Gedney House, interior view.

The Gedney House is a historic Colonial American house, (First Period) built circa 1665. It is located at 21 High Street, near the intersection of Summer Street. The Gedney and Cox Houses are operated as a non-profit museum by Historic New England. The house is rarely open to the public, though private tours can be arranged.

The house was built for Eleazor Gedney, a well-to-do shipwright of the Gedney family, married to the sister of John Turner, builder of Salem's House of the Seven Gables. Gedney purchased the unimproved land here in April 1664 close to the shore and the "buildplace" for his boats. He was married in June 1665, and the original portion of the house, two stories with gabled attic to the left and a parlor with lean-to roof to the right was erected at this time. Long-gone extensions at the rear (where some structural evidence survives) were probably original. They were surely in existence at the time of Eleazer's early death in 1683 when an estate inventory mentions the hall, hall chamber, a garret, "parlour or lento" and "lento chambr," and "Kitchin, Loft over it & little leantoo." The latter lean-to was presumably in the rear.

Around 1703–1706, the original parlor lean-to was raised to a full two stories. The last (and most extensive) structural changes followed about 1800, whereby a new two-story lean-to at the rear with separate chimney replaced whatever had preceded it. At this time also the framed overhang along the street was furred out and a basement kitchen introduced. Around 1962 the central chimney was removed and the interior stripped. The house was acquired by the Society for the Preservation of New England Antiquities (now Historic New England) in 1967.

The house is significant for its structural carpentry and for surviving early paint and decorative finishes. In the hall chamber three successive color schemes can be identified, the earliest thought to be contemporary or near-contemporary with original construction.

In 2002 the Oxford Dendrochronology Laboratory analyzed timber from the original structure and ascertained that donor trees were felled at the following times: Spring 1664 and Winter 1664–5.

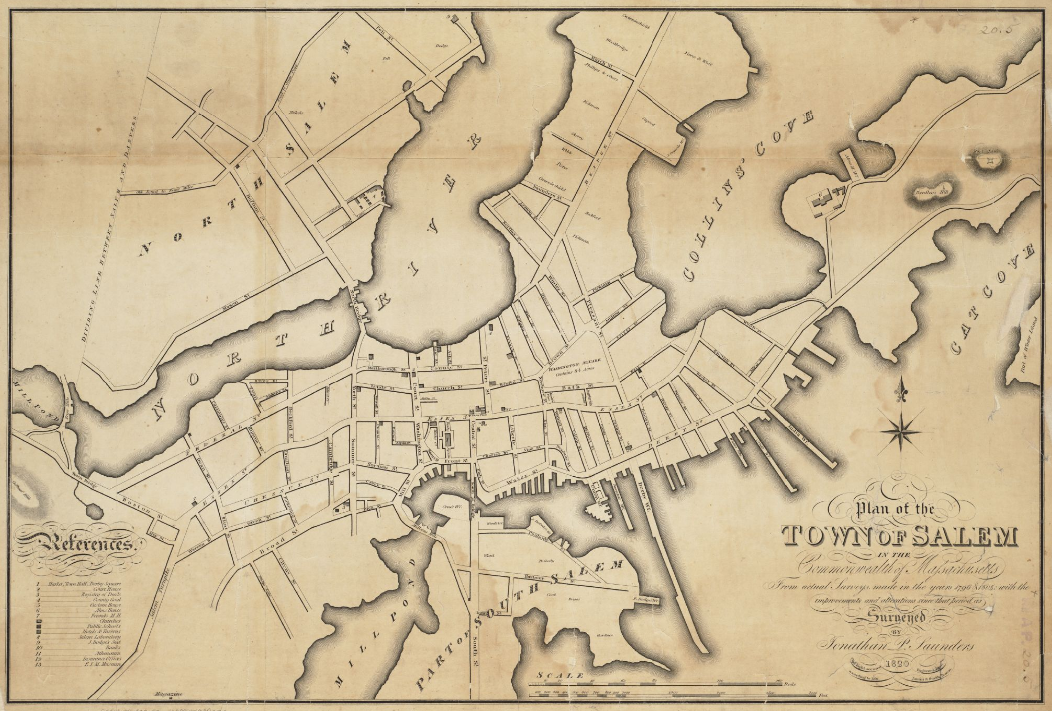
Salem – 1820

== See also ==
- List of the oldest buildings in Massachusetts
- List of the oldest buildings in the United States
- List of historic houses in Massachusetts
- National Register of Historic Places listings in Salem, Massachusetts
- National Register of Historic Places listings in Essex County, Massachusetts
