= Stephen Gedney =

American electrical engineer

Stephen D. Gedney is an American electrical engineer, currently a Distinguished Professor of Electrical Engineering at the University of Colorado Denver's College of Engineering, Design and Computing. Gedney is a pioneer in computational electromagnetic techniques. He is most widely known for his development of the Uniaxial Perfectly Matched Layer media method, the complex-frequency shifted convolutional PML, along with J. Alan Roden, and his contributions to the Locally Corrected Nystrom method. Gedney's papers and textbook on the finite difference time domain technique in particular are widely cited. Gedney is an IEEE Fellow. Gedney is currently a University of Colorado Distinguished Professor working in the Department of Electrical Engineering at University of Colorado Denver.
