= Gladney =

Gladney is a surname. Notable people with the surname include:

- Bob Gladney (born 1957), Canadian ice hockey player
- Dru C. Gladney, American anthropologist
- Edna Gladney (1886–1961), American activist
- Graves Gladney (1907–1976), American illustrator
- Heather Gladney (born 1957), American writer
- Jeff Gladney (1996–2022), American football player
- Larry Gladney (born 1957), American physicist and cosmologist
- Lynn Gladney, American politician
