= Camano Island =

Island and CDP in Washington, United States

Camano Island, Washington
- CDP
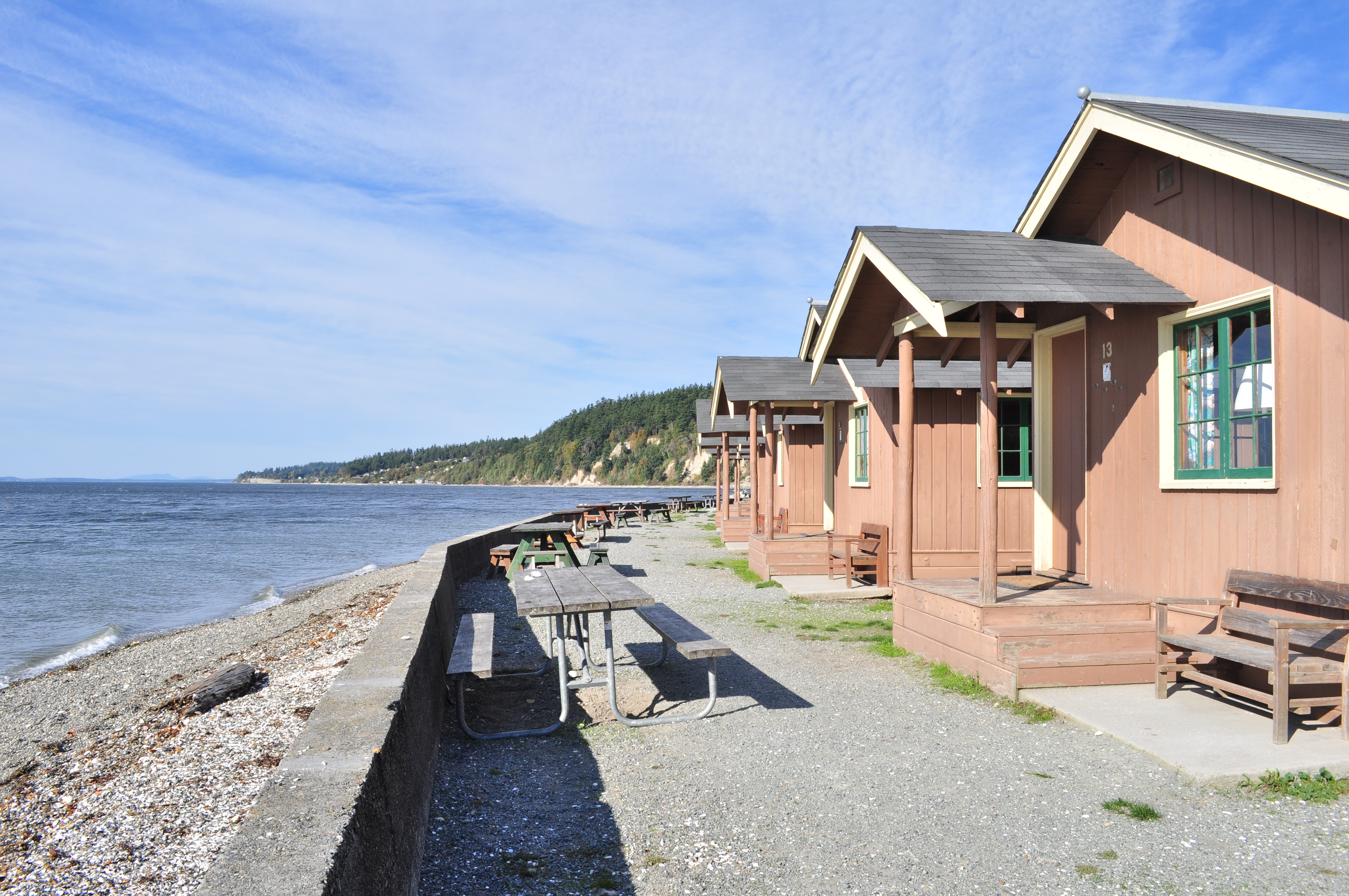
- The island's western beach at Cama Beach State Park

- Location within Island County and Washington

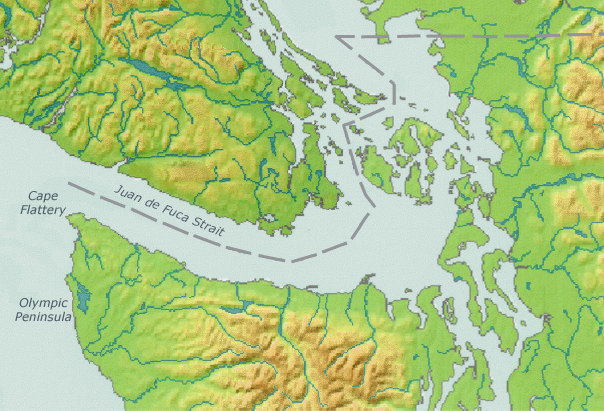
- Location within Strait of Juan de Fuca Location within Washington (state)
- Coordinates: 48.186239°N 122.507697°W
- Country: United States
- State: Washington
- County: Island
- Waterbody: Puget Sound
- Named for: Jacinto Caamaño

Area
  - Total: 94.9 sq mi (245.9 km^{2})
  - Land: 39.8 sq mi (103.0 km^{2})
  - Water: 55.2 sq mi (142.9 km^{2})

Dimensions
  - Length: 15.6 mi (25.1 km)
  - Width: 0.75–6.60 mi (1.21–10.62 km)
- Elevation: 52 ft (16 m)

Population (2020)
  - Total: 17,356
  - Density: 436.6/sq mi (168.59/km^{2})
- Time zone: UTC-8 (Pacific (PST))
  - Summer (DST): UTC-7 (PDT)
- ZIP code: 98282
- FIPS code: 53-09365
- GNIS feature ID: 1503722
- Website: whidbeycamanoislands.com

Camano Island /kəˈmeɪnoʊ/ is a large island in Possession Sound, a section of Puget Sound. It is part of Island County, Washington, and is located between Whidbey Island and the mainland (Snohomish County) by the Saratoga Passage to the west and Port Susan and Davis Slough to the east. The island has one road connection to the mainland, via State Route 532 over the Camano Gateway Bridge at the northeast end of the island, connecting to the city of Stanwood.

The island has a total area of 39.77 square miles (103.0 km^{2}), making it one of the largest in the state of Washington. It has a year-round population of 15,661 as of the 2010 census. The population peaks at over 17,000 during the summer months due to part-time residents with vacation homes on the island. It is an unincorporated area with several small communities and shares civic facilities with nearby Stanwood, including its school district, and post office.

Camano Island is home to two state parks, Cama Beach and Camano Island State Park, and several county and local parks.

== Etymology and name ==
One recorded name of Camano Island in Lushootseed, collected by ethnologist Colin E. Tweddell, is ʔəw̓alus. This name has also been given as the name for the settlement of Camano rather than the whole island. However, other sources agree with Tweddell that dəxʷxʷit̕xʷit̕əb or ʔəw̓ʔəw̓alus is the name of Camano City.

In English, the island was named for 18th century Spanish explorer Jacinto Caamaño. American explorer Charles Wilkes, during the Wilkes Expedition of 1838–1842, named it Macdonough Island in honor of Thomas Macdonough for his victory of the Battle of Lake Champlain during the War of 1812. Following this theme, Wilkes named the body of water between Camano and Whidbey Island after Macdonough's flagship the Saratoga. When Henry Kellett reorganized the official British Admiralty charts in 1847, he removed Wilkes' name Macdonough and bestowed the name Camano, which the Spanish explorer Francisco de Eliza had originally given to Admiralty Inlet in 1790. Wilkes' name Saratoga Passage was retained.

The island was known as Perry Island after the 1855 Treaty of Point Elliott between several Indigenous peoples and the United States. The island was also called Crow Island during the early 20th century.

== History ==
=== 19th century ===
Prior to American settlement, Camano Island was within the territory of both the Kikiallus and the Snohomish peoples. The Kikiallus controlled the northern parts of the island around modern-day Utsalady, while the Snohomish controlled the areas of the island south of Point Demock (Lushootseed: duʔdukʷšəd). Other tribes also used the island, such as the Lower Skagit, Stillaguamish, Snoqualmie, and Sauk-Suiattle. The island may have been a "free-use" area where usage was not strictly restricted like other places.

Prior to the population decline due to smallpox, there were likely many villages all along the island, and the Kikiallus were said to have 6 villages. Artifacts and human remains attributed to an old village were discovered by archaeologists at Cama Beach which were dated to 1,600 years before present. By the beginning of the 19th century, there were two known villages: a Kikiallus village at Utsalady (Lushootseed: ʔəcəladiʔ), and a Snohomish village at Camano Head (Lushootseed: x̌ʷuyšəd).

Around 1820, a major landslide occurred at Camano Head that completely demolished the village there. It also created a tidal wave which destroyed another Snohomish village on Hat Island, and almost destroyed the main village of Hibulb. Hundreds of people died or drowned, including visitors to the village for the clamming season. After the catastrophic event, the site of Camano Head was never used as a village, but did continue to be used seasonally for clamming.

Camano Island continued to be under the Snohomish and Kikiallus until 1855, when, under the Treaty of Point Elliot, they ceded control of most of their lands, including Camano Island, to the United States. White settlement on the island began in the 1850s and it was included in the newly established Island County in 1853. The first major settlement on the island was at Utsalady (originally spelled Utsaladdy), which would be home to several sawmills. The first sawmill on the island was constructed by Thomas Cranney in 1858 and a school district was organized in 1862 to serve 17 students in a one-room schoolhouse.

Cranney's sawmill at Utsalady was seized by the federal government in 1876 due to his bankruptcy and sold the following year to the Puget Mill Company, which enlarged it to handle 75,000 board feet per day. A plat for Utsalady was filed in 1891, with the town boasting three stores, two hotels, a telegraph line, and daily steamship service to Coupeville. The area had a large population of Chinese and Norwegian immigrants who worked at the mill until the former were expelled by anti-Chinese riots in the 1880s. By the 1880 census, there were 112 residents in Utsalady and 74 Coast Salish peoples in other settlements on Camano Island. Following the Panic of 1893, the Utsalady sawmill was closed and left 125 residents unemployed, but five shingle mills were later opened to capitalize on the island's timber.

=== 20th century ===
Camano Island was identified as an ideal location for farming and vacation homes during the early 20th century, as logging had cleared the island's old-growth forests. A cable ferry connecting the island's north end to Stanwood was replaced by a bridge in 1909. The first resort settlements on Camano Island at Utsalady, Juniper Beach, and Madrona beach were established in the 1920s, but were later dwarfed by larger resorts like Cama Beach (opened in 1936). During the Prohibition era, Camano Island was used as a major transiting point for rumrunners due to its remoteness and proximity to Canadian waters. The Juniper Beach area was also home to a new oyster farm that was established in 1930 and helped sustain the island during the Great Depression.

In 1943, the Puget Mill Company began developing its plots into residential subdivisions, ushering in the arrival of permanent summer homes on the island. The Stillaguamish River bridge to Stanwood was replaced in July 1950 by the Mark Clark Bridge and the island's roads were also improved by the state government. A new state park was established in 1948 and opened the following year after a day-long event in which 800 residents cleared the land to prepare for park development. In the 1950s, the island received its own post office, having previously been part of the Stanwood post office's delivery area, an organized fire department, and telephone service. Major population growth in the 1960s and early 1970s caused strain on the island's infrastructure, requiring the creation of a new planning office and a satellite county courthouse.

== Geography ==
Camano Island is located within the Puget Sound, separated from the mainland of Snohomish County by Port Susan and Davis Slough. It lies east of the Saratoga Passage, which separates it from the larger Whidbey Island, and is south of Skagit Bay. The northern entrance to Camano Island is located 55 miles (89 km) north of Seattle. The island itself is 15.6 miles (25.1 km) long and has a width of 0.75 to 6.6 miles (1.21 to 10.62 km), with 52 miles (84 km) of shoreline.

According to the United States Census Bureau, the Camano CDP has a total area of 94.94 square miles (245.9 km^{2}), of which 39.91 sq mi (103.4 km^{2}) is land and 55.03 sq mi (142.5 km^{2}) is water. Approximately 83 percent of the shoreline around the island is privately owned.

The island has a wide array of native and migratory birds, including bald eagles and herons. Migrating gray whales travel annually through the Saratoga Passage in March and April, making them visible from Camano Island.

During the Last Ice Age the island, sound and land surrounding the sound was covered by a mile thick sheet of ice. As temperatures rose the glacier receded, carving the island and leaving behind deposits of glacial till.

=== Communities ===
- Utsalady
- Terry's Corner (including new town center)
- Buena Vista
- Madrona Beach
- Sunset Beach
- Juniper Beach
- Lona Beach
- Rockaway Beach
- Maple Grove Beach
- Livingston Bay
- Iverson Beach
- Tillicum Beach
- Tyee Beach
- Camaloch
- Camano City
- Indian Beach
- Rocky Point
- Camano Country Club
- Thunder Ridge
- Lost Lake
- Mabana
- Tyee Beach
- Tillicum Beach
- Pebble Beach
- Carp Lake

=== Parks and recreation ===
The state parks system has two properties on Camano Island: Camano Island State Park and Cama Beach State Park, both located on the west side of the island. Camano Island State Park, near Elger Bay, was opened in 1949 after a one-day volunteer effort with 500 local residents to prepare the property. It has 6,700 feet (2,000 m) of shoreline, camping areas, and hiking trails on 244 acres (99 ha) of land. Cama Beach State Park opened in 2008 at the site of a former beach resort, which was restored with beachside cabins and hiking trails.

Camano Island also has 13 local parks maintained by the Island County government. The largest park, Camano Ridge, includes 400 acres (160 ha) of inland protected forestland and hiking trails that were transferred from the Washington State Department of Natural Resources in 2003. At the north end of the island is Iverson Preserve, a 120 acres (49 ha) beach and estuary with fishing and boat access. Barnum Point County Park on Port Susan was opened in August 2019 with 167 acres (68 ha) of waterfront space, acquired with $750,000 in private donations through a local land trust.

== Demographics ==
Estimated population
Year	Pop.	±% p.a.
1860	58	—
1870	157	+10.47%
1880	186	+1.71%
1895	200	+0.48%
1900	460	+18.13%
1910	678	+3.96%
1920	910	+2.99%
1930	679	−2.89%
1940	876	+2.58%
1950	1,160	+2.85%
1960	1,395	+1.86%
1970	2,600	+6.42%
1980	5,080	+6.93%
1990	7,329	+3.73%
2000	13,347	+6.18%
2010	15,661	+1.61%
2020	17,356	+1.03%
Source: Kimball & Dean (1994); United States Census Bureau; 1990 2000 2010

Camano was listed as a census designated place in the 2000 U.S. census. It was deleted prior to the 2010 U.S. census, where it was reclassified as a census county division; and the reappeared as a CDP in the 2020 U.S. census.

Camano Island has a large seasonal population of snowbirds and other part-time residents, which brings the summer population of the island to an estimated 17,000. The retiree population on the island began arriving in the mid-20th century, including residents from outside of Washington state. Based on per capita income, one of the more reliable measures of affluence, Camano ranks 99th of 522 areas in the state of Washington to be ranked.

=== Racial and ethnic composition ===
Camano CDP, Washington – Racial and ethnic composition Note: the US Census treats Hispanic/Latino as an ethnic category. This table excludes Latinos from the racial categories and assigns them to a separate category. Hispanics/Latinos may be of any race.
Race / Ethnicity (NH = Non-Hispanic)	Pop 2000	Pop 2010	Pop 2020	% 2000	% 2010	% 2020
White alone (NH)	12,576	x	15,050	94.22%	x	86.71%
Black or African American alone (NH)	29	x	101	0.22%	x	0.58%
Native American or Alaska Native alone (NH)	104	x	119	0.78%	x	0.69%
Asian alone (NH)	81	x	315	0.61%	x	1.81%
Native Hawaiian or Pacific Islander alone (NH)	30	x	40	0.22%	x	0.23%
Other race alone (NH)	23	x	65	0.17%	x	0.37%
Mixed race or Multiracial (NH)	229	x	948	1.72%	x	5.46%
Hispanic or Latino (any race)	275	x	718	2.06%	x	4.14%
Total	13,347	x	17,356	100.00%	x	100.00%

=== 2020 census ===
As of the 2020 census, there were 17,356 people and 7,456 households living within the boundaries of the Camano census-designated place, which encompasses the whole island. The island's population density was 436.1 inhabitants per square mile (168.4/km^{2}). There were 8,996 total housing units, of which 82.9% were occupied and 17.1% were vacant or for occasional use. The racial makeup of Camano Island was 87.6% White, 0.6% Black or African American, 0.8% Native American and Alaska Native, 1.9% Asian, 0.2% Native Hawaiian and Pacific Islander, and 1.2% from other races. Residents who identified as more than one race were 7.7% of the population. Hispanic or Latino residents of any race were 4.1% of the population.

Of the 7,456 households on Camano Island, 60.6% were married couples living together, and 5.6% were cohabitating but unmarried. Households with a male householder with no spouse or partner were 13.9% of the population, while households with a female householder with no spouse or partner were 19.9% of the population. Out of all households, 18.2% had children under the age of 18 living with them and 51.4% had residents who were 65 years of age or older. There were 7,456 occupied housing units on Camano Island, of which 88.6% were owner-occupied and 11.4% were occupied by renters.

The median age of the island's residents was 56.7 years old for all sexes, 55.8 years old for males, and 57.4 years old for females. Of the total population, 16.3% of residents were under the age of 19; 3.5% were between the ages of 20 and 24; 16.3% were between the ages of 25 and 44; 30.7% were between the ages of 45 and 64; and 33.2% were 65 years of age or older. The gender makeup of the island's residents was 49.1% male and 50.9% female.

== Government ==
Camano Island is part of Island County, despite its only road connection leading to Snohomish County, and has no incorporated communities. The island's residents have previously proposed incorporating as a city or joining Snohomish County to increase access to services, but to no result. Island County maintains a small government campus on Camano Island that opened in the 1970s to house the county sheriff and other offices. The original campus was replaced by the Island County Administration Building, which opened in late 2020.

The island shares several of its services with neighboring Stanwood, including the Stanwood-Camano School District. The school district has two elementary schools on Camano Island, opened in the 2000s, while older students attend classes at Stanwood's schools. Sno-Isle Libraries, which serves Island and Snohomish counties, opened a public library inside a temporary space on Camano Island as part of a pilot program that began in 2007. A permanent library at Terry's Corner opened in August 2015 after voters on the island approved a $2.3 million bond measure to remodel a former restaurant.

== Culture ==
=== Events ===
- The Port Susan Snow Goose & Birding Festival (February)
- The Camano Island Mother's Day Art Studio Tour (May)
- The Spring Art Show (June)
- Art by the Bay, The Stanwood–Camano Festival of Art and Music (July)
- The Stanwood Camano Community Fair (August)
- The Harvest Jubilee (September)

=== Notable people ===
- Mark W. Clark, U.S. Army general
- William Corson, actor
- Jack Gunter, artist
- Colton Harris-Moore, former fugitive known as the "Barefoot Bandit"
- Mary Margaret Haugen, state senator
- Dave Hayes, state legislator
- Caitlin Kinnunen, actress
- Thomas T. Minor, former mayor of Seattle and Port Townsend
- Robert Neale, ace pilot
- Pearl Anderson Wanamaker, state legislator and state superintendent of schools
- Laurie Z, musician
- Alfred Zeisler, film producer, director, actor and screenwriter

== Infrastructure ==
The island is home to a 39-foot (12 m) NEXRAD weather radar that is used by the National Weather Service's Seattle office to monitor and forecast local weather conditions.

=== Transportation ===
Camano Island is connected to mainland Washington by State Route 532, which travels from the north end of the island to Stanwood via two bridges over the Davis Slough and Stillaguamish River. The island has several connecting roads that travel along the west and east edges to various neighborhoods and the two state parks. Island Transit operates free bus services connecting Camano Island to Stanwood, with onward connections to Mount Vernon, Amtrak Cascades, and Everett.

Ferry connections to Coupeville and Everett existed historically, but the routes are no longer active. Local residents rejected a car ferry in 1999. A passenger-only Camano–Whidbey ferry has been proposed and studied by Island County.

=== Utilities ===
Camano Island's electricity is provided by the Snohomish County Public Utility District, a public agency based in Everett. The island's electrical supply is delivered through a set of two high-voltage transmission lines that cross from Stanwood to a substation in northern Camano; the second transmission line was constructed in 2023. Tap water is sourced from groundwater wells on the island that are maintained by community cooperatives and small companies rather than a large operator.

== Education ==
The entirety of Camano Island is served by the Stanwood-Camano School District.

Two elementary schools are on Camano Island: Elger Bay and Utsalady. The island is divided between the attendance zones for these schools. The island is divided between the attendance boundaries of Port Susan and Stanwood middle schools. The district's sole comprehensive high school is Stanwood High School.

There were formerly multiple school districts on Camano Island. The district at Utsalady Point was established in 1862. There were also the Camano City, Mabana, and Livingston Bay districts. The Camano Island school district merged with the Stanwood school district in 1937, and that in turn merged with the East Stanwood and Warm Beach districts in 1944. That district was previously called Twin Cities and then Stanwood, before getting its current name, Stanwood-Camano in 1999. For a period Camano had no operating schools, but the Elger Bay and Utsalady schools opened in 2000.

== See also ==
- List of islands of Washington (state)
