= Camano Island State Park =

State park in Washington, United States

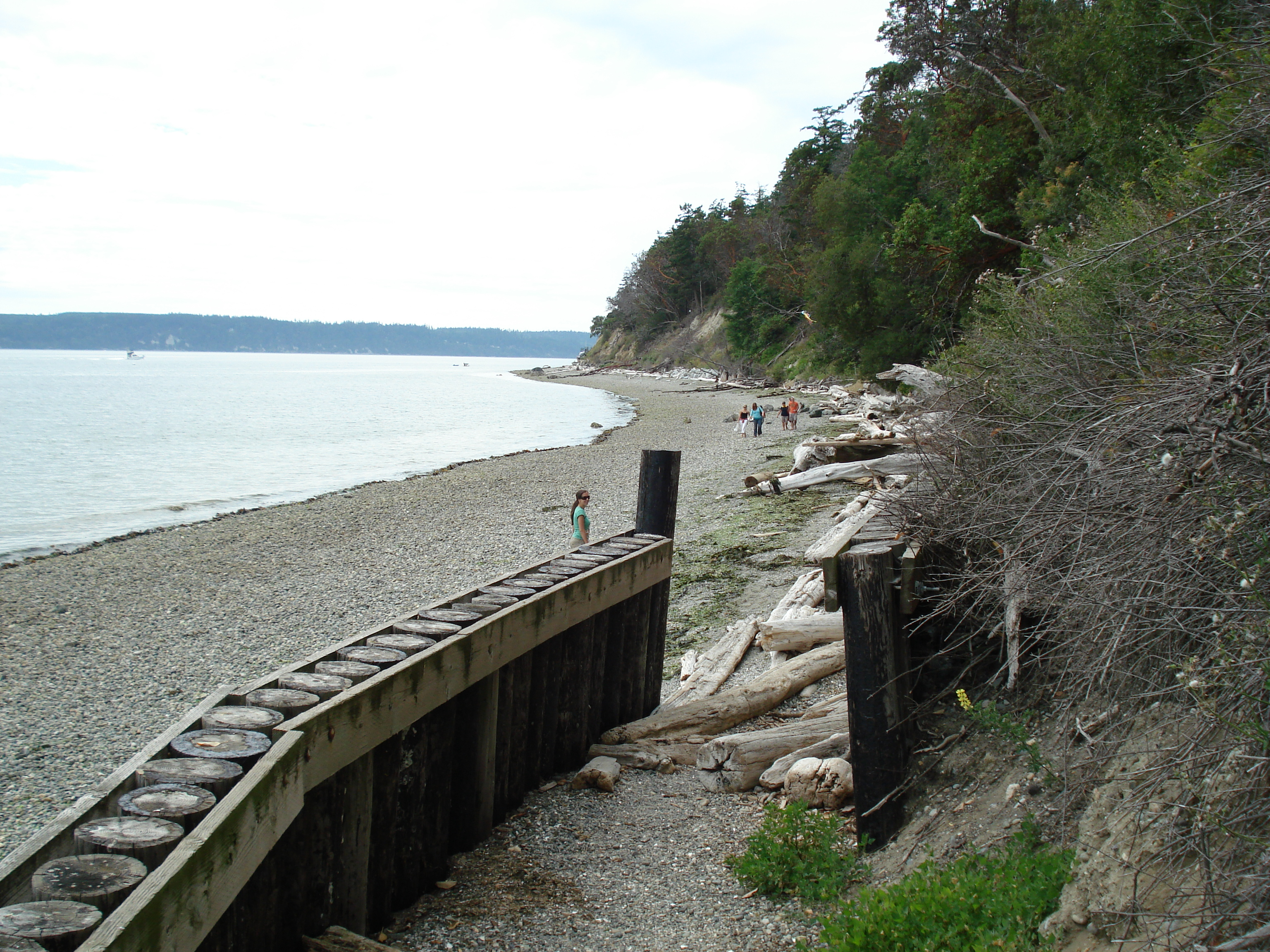

- Location within Washington (state) Location within the United States
- Interactive map of Camano Island State Park
- Location: Island County, Washington, United States
- Coordinates: 48°07′14″N 122°29′23″W
- Area: 173 acres (70 ha)
- Elevation: 0 ft (0 m)
- Established: 1947
- Administrator: Washington State Parks and Recreation Commission
- Website: Official website

Camano Island State Park is a public recreation area on Camano Island in Puget Sound located 14 miles (23 km) southwest of Stanwood in Island County, Washington, United States. The park occupies 173 acres (70 ha) and has 6,700 feet (2,000 m) of shoreline. It is managed by the Washington State Parks and Recreation Commission.

== History ==
After land was set aside for park purposes in 1947, a local group of 500 volunteers met and completed initial work on the park on July 27, 1949.

== Nature ==
A wide variety of animals make their homes in the woods, beaches and waters of Camano Island State Park. Mammals include mule deer, elk, skunks, coyotes, chipmunks, rabbits, raccoon, whales, and otters. Fish, shellfish, crustaceans and other sea life in the waters of the park include crabs, sea cucumber, trout, cod, crappie, perch, sharks and eels. A variety of birds are found in the park including bald eagles, owls, osprey, ducks, geese, gulls, hummingbirds, wrens, and herons. These animals live among trees and plants like cedar, Douglas fir, spruce, alder, yew, seaweed, rhododendron, Indian pipe and thistle.

== Recreation ==
The park features swimming and diving, fishing, clamming and crabbing, cabin rentals, an 88-site tent campground, group camp, restroom and shower facilities for campers, and a picnic area. There are 3 miles (4.8 km) of hiking trails and a mile-long biking trail, and boat ramps providing access to Puget Sound.
