= Gedney family =

Coat of Arms of John Gedney

The Gedneys were among the original settlers of Salem, Massachusetts. The family patriarch, John Gedney (originally of Norwich), sailed in 1636 out of Yarmouth, England on the Mary Anne. One of his sons, Bartholomew, was one of the judges who presided over the infamous witch trials. Bartholomew's brother, Eleazor (Eleazar) built the Gedney House. which still stands in Salem, around 1665.

During the 18th century, the family moved to Westchester County, New York, settling at Mamaroneck and White Plains.

The American War of Independence was particularly hard on relatives of the Gedney family. Bartholomew Gedney (1640 – 1698) of Massachusetts, a magistrate at the Salem Witch Trials, was a great-great grandfather of Thomas Fairfax (1762 – 1846), 9th Lord Fairfax of Cameron. The 9th Lord's predecessor, Thomas Fairfax (1732 – 1802), 6th Lord Fairfax of Cameron, was forced to forfeit his land in what is now Fairfax, Virginia. Ironically, the 6th Lord Fairfax's father had hired George Washington to survey this land (giving the general a familiarity with the area that must have proven useful during the war if not in the disposition of the spoils after the war). The family had another important connection with George Washington (1732 - 1799), 1st President of the USA. - Hannah Fairfax (b.c. 1739), sister of the 8th Lord Fairax, was married to Col. Warner Washington, a cousin of George Washington.

The land of Joshua Gedney, in Dutchess County along the Hudson River, was similarly seized and auctioned, eventually ended up in the hands of the Vanderbilts and President Franklin D. Roosevelt. Today it forms part of the Vanderbilt-Roosevelt Historic Park. Joshua Gedney and his brother Joseph were forced to change their names to Gidney and to flee from New York to New Brunswick and Nova Scotia in 1783.
