= Utsalady, Washington =

Unincorporated community in Washington, US

- Unincorporated community
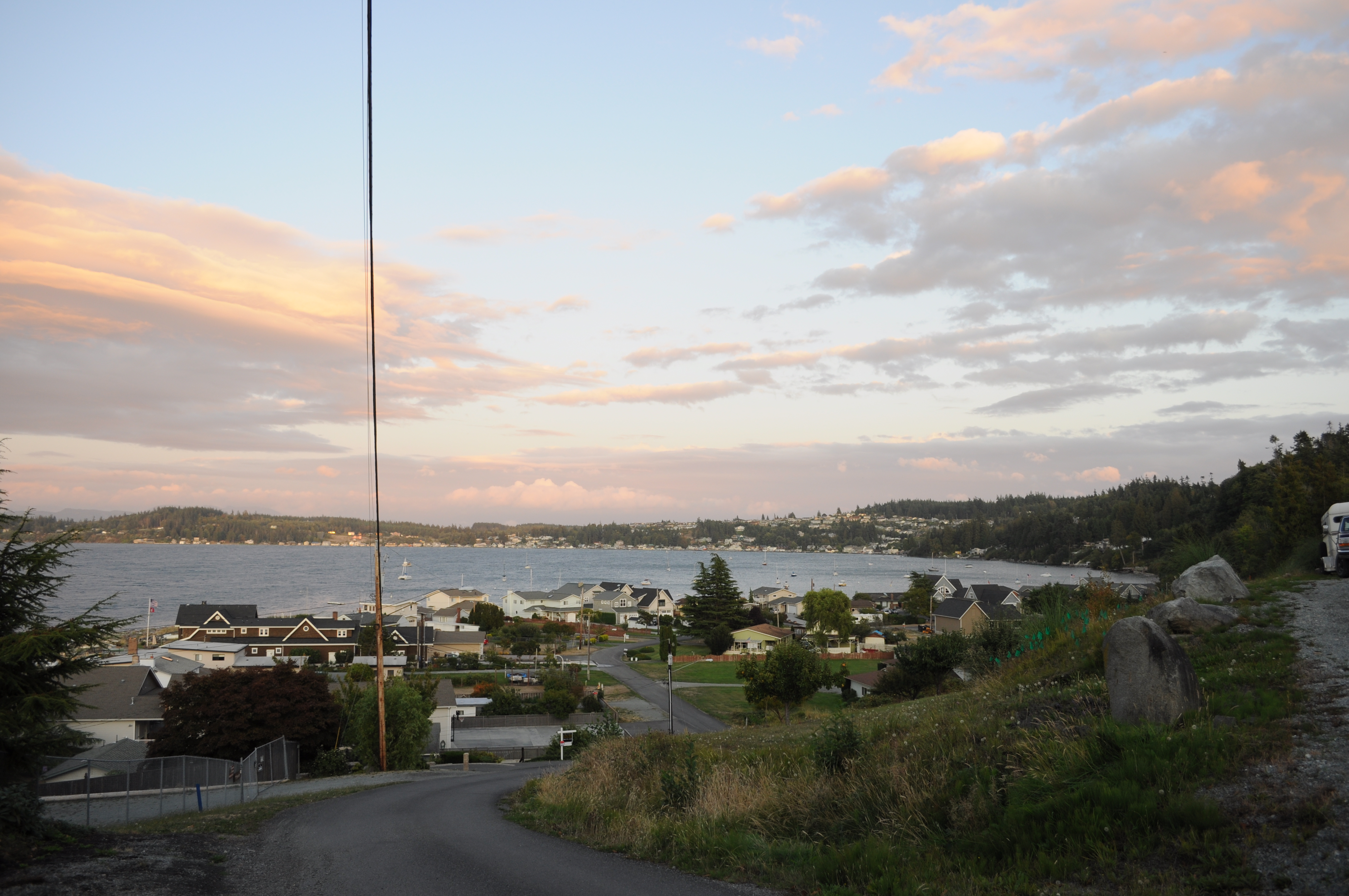
- Utsalady, Washington, from near Utsalady Point, 2009

- Location within Washington (state) Location within the United States
- Coordinates: 48°15′06″N 122°28′38″W
- Country: United States
- State: Washington
- County: Island
- Settled: 1853
- Elevation: 39 ft (12 m)
- Time zone: UTC-8 (Pacific (PST))
  - Summer (DST): UTC-7 (PDT)
- Area code: 360
- GNIS feature ID: 1512754

Utsalady (also, historically, Utsaladdy and Lushootseed: ʔəcəladiʔ) is an unincorporated community on the north shore of Camano Island, Island County, Washington, US. It is located within the Camano CDP. It has an elementary school, part of the Stanwood school system. The 1923 building of the Utsalady Ladies Aid (founded 1908, and still active as of 2008) is listed on the National Register of Historic Places and the Washington State Heritage Register.

The name "Utsalady" comes from the Lushootseed placename /ʔəcəládiʔ/, of unknown meaning.

== Early history ==
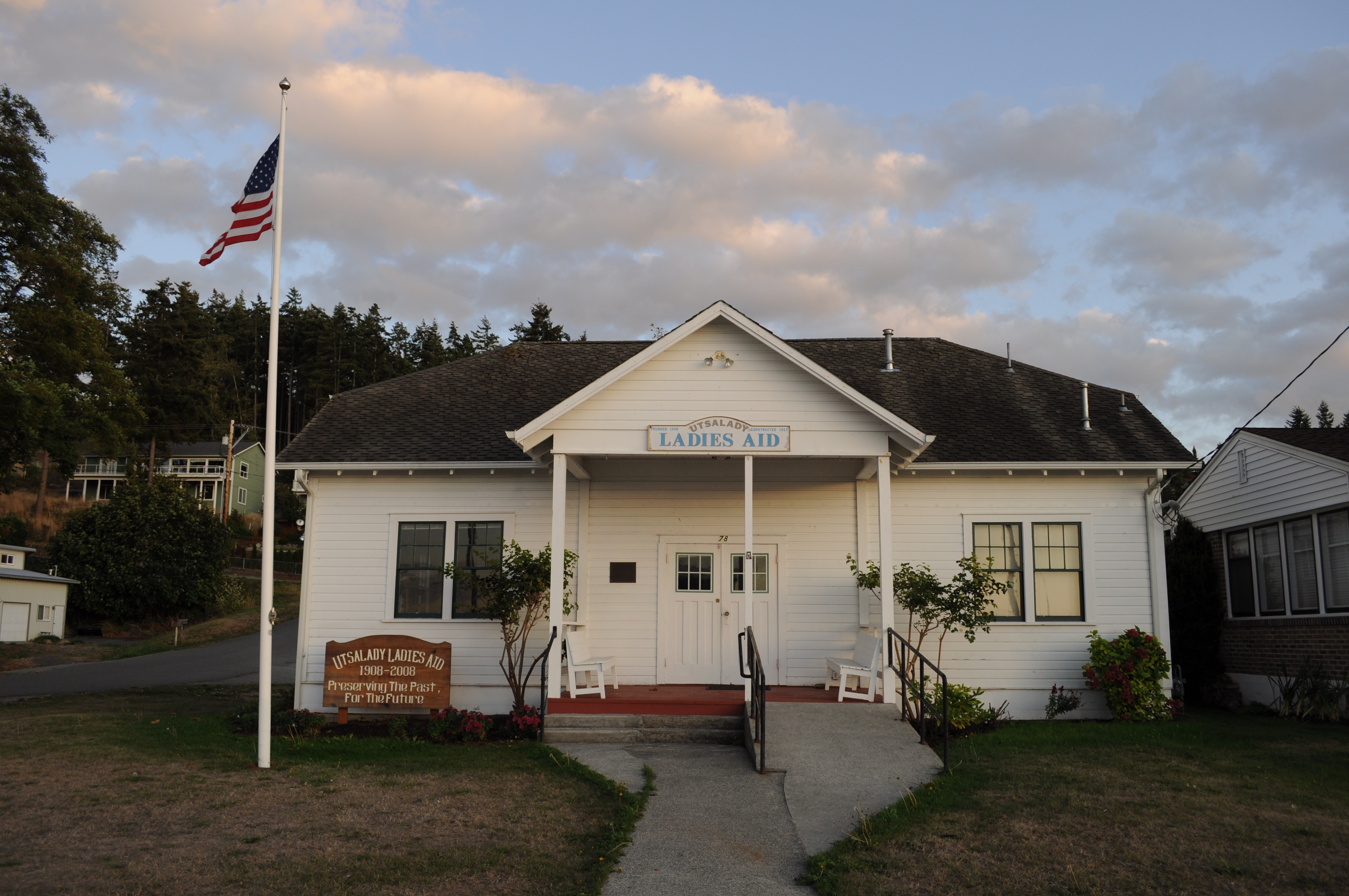
Utsalady Ladies Aid building

The Kikiallus Indians inhabited this area. They had a long-house here and along the Skagit River on Fir Island. They were a part of the Coast Salish.

The natives of the region called the place Doksk Ad. The first settlers of European origin arrived in 1853; two years later Utsalady was exporting timber as far as the shipyards at Brest in France and, by 1860, to Shanghai.

In 1870, the community had 54 houses, 147 people, a blacksmith shop, telegraph, a saloon, a shipyard and a school. In 1872 a Masonic hall was added to this and in 1874 a granary. As of 1883, sailing ships were carrying away 74,000 board feet of timber daily.

Utsalady was a base from which settlers headed to the Stillaguamish and Skagit Valleys on the mainland.

The Masonic lodge originally established at Utsalady, F&AM Camanio Lodge No. 19, moved in 1890 to the mainland in Stanwood, where it still remains as of 2009.
