= Washington State Route 116 =

State highway in Jefferson County, Washington, US

State Route 116

- SR 116 highlighted in red

Route information
- Auxiliary route of US 101
- Maintained by WSDOT
- Length: 9.83 mi (15.82 km)
- Existed: 1991–present

Major junctions
- West end: SR 19 in Port Hadlock-Irondale
- East end: Fort Flagler State Park

Location
- Country: United States
- State: Washington
- Counties: Jefferson

Highway system
- State highways in Washington; Interstate; US; State; Scenic; Pre-1964; 1964 renumbering; Former
← SR 115	→ SR 117

State Route 116 (SR 116) is a 9.83-mile-long (15.82 km) state highway in the U.S. state of Washington, serving Indian and Marrowstone islands in Jefferson County. The two-lane highway travels east from SR 19 in Port Hadlock-Irondale across the Portage Canal to Indian Island and Marrowstone Island, turning north and ending at the entrance to Fort Flagler State Park. SR 116 was created in 1991 and follows the route of Flagler Road, built and paved in the 1960s.

== Route description ==
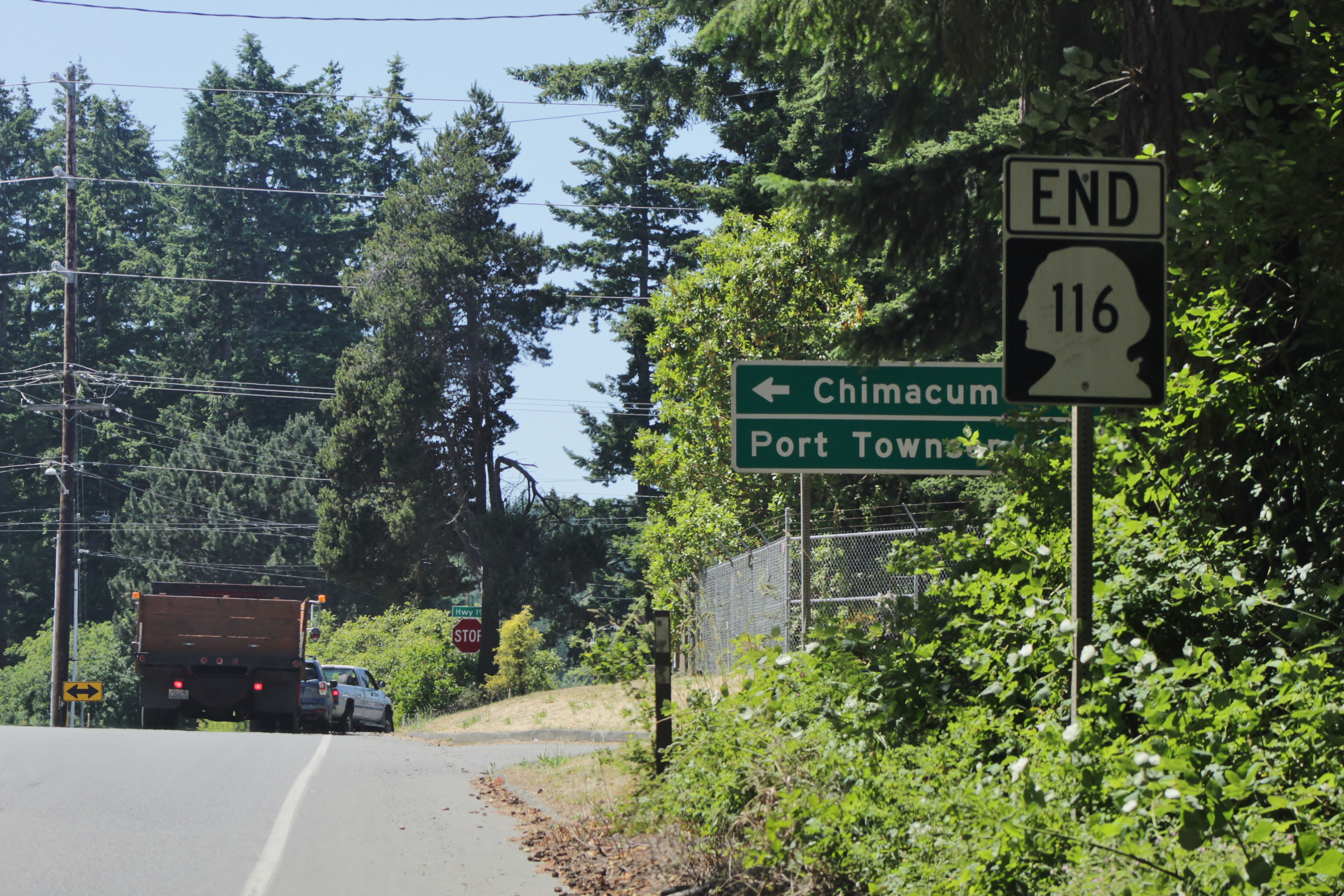
SR 116 intersects with SR 19 at its western terminus in Port Hadlock

SR 116 begins at an intersection with SR 19 in Port Hadlock-Irondale, located between Port Ludlow and Port Townsend. The highway travels east as Nees' Corner Road over Chimacum Creek and through the community of Port Hadlock before crossing the Portage Canal onto Indian Island. SR 116 continues east on Indian Island as Flagler Road along the coast of Oak Bay and turns north along Scow Bay onto Marrowstone Island, entering a wooded area. The highway continues north through central Marrowstone Island and passes through Mystery Bay State Park before ending at the entrance to Fort Flagler State Park.

Every year, the Washington State Department of Transportation (WSDOT) conducts a series of surveys on its highways in the state to measure traffic volume. This is expressed in terms of annual average daily traffic (AADT), which is a measure of traffic volume for any average day of the year. In 2011, WSDOT calculated that the busiest section of the highway was its western terminus at SR 19, carrying 6,500 vehicles, while the least busiest section was the eastern terminus at Fort Flagler State Park, carrying 440 vehicles. SR 116 is designated as a part of the National Highway System between SR 19 and Indian Island.

== History ==
A road connecting Fort Flagler State Park and Marrowstone Island with Indian Island and Port Hadlock-Irondale on the Olympic Peninsula has existed and been paved since the late 1960s. The roadway was codified in 1991 as SR 116, traveling east from newly created SR 19 and was formally added to the state highway system on April 1, 1992. The bridge over the Port Townsend Ship Canal, also known as the Portage Canal, was retrofitted by WSDOT in late 2007 and early 2008 to add safer railings for pedestrians.

== Major intersections ==
The entire highway is in Jefferson County.

Location	mi	km	Destinations	Notes
Port Hadlock-Irondale	0.00	0.00	SR 19 – Chimacum, Port Townsend	Western terminus
Fort Flagler State Park	9.83	15.82	Park entrance	Eastern terminus, continues as Flager Road
1.000 mi = 1.609 km; 1.000 km = 0.621 mi
