= Washington State Route 19 =

State highway in Jefferson County, Washington, US

State Route 19
- SR 19 highlighted in red

Route information
- Maintained by WSDOT
- Length: 14.09 mi (22.68 km)
- Existed: 1991–present

Major junctions
- South end: SR 104 near Port Ludlow
- SR 116 in Port Hadlock-Irondale
- North end: SR 20 near Port Townsend

Location
- Country: United States
- State: Washington
- County: Jefferson

Highway system
- State highways in Washington; Interstate; US; State; Scenic; Pre-1964; 1964 renumbering; Former
← SR 18	→ SR 20

State Route 19 (SR 19) is a 14.09-mile-long (22.68 km) state highway serving rural Jefferson County on the Olympic Peninsula in the U.S. state of Washington. The highway travels from SR 104 south of Port Ludlow and travels north through Chimacum and Port Hadlock-Irondale, intersecting SR 116, to end at SR 20 southwest of Port Townsend near the Jefferson County International Airport. SR 19 was established in 1991 on a roadway that had been built in the 1950s and paved in the 1960s.

== Route description ==
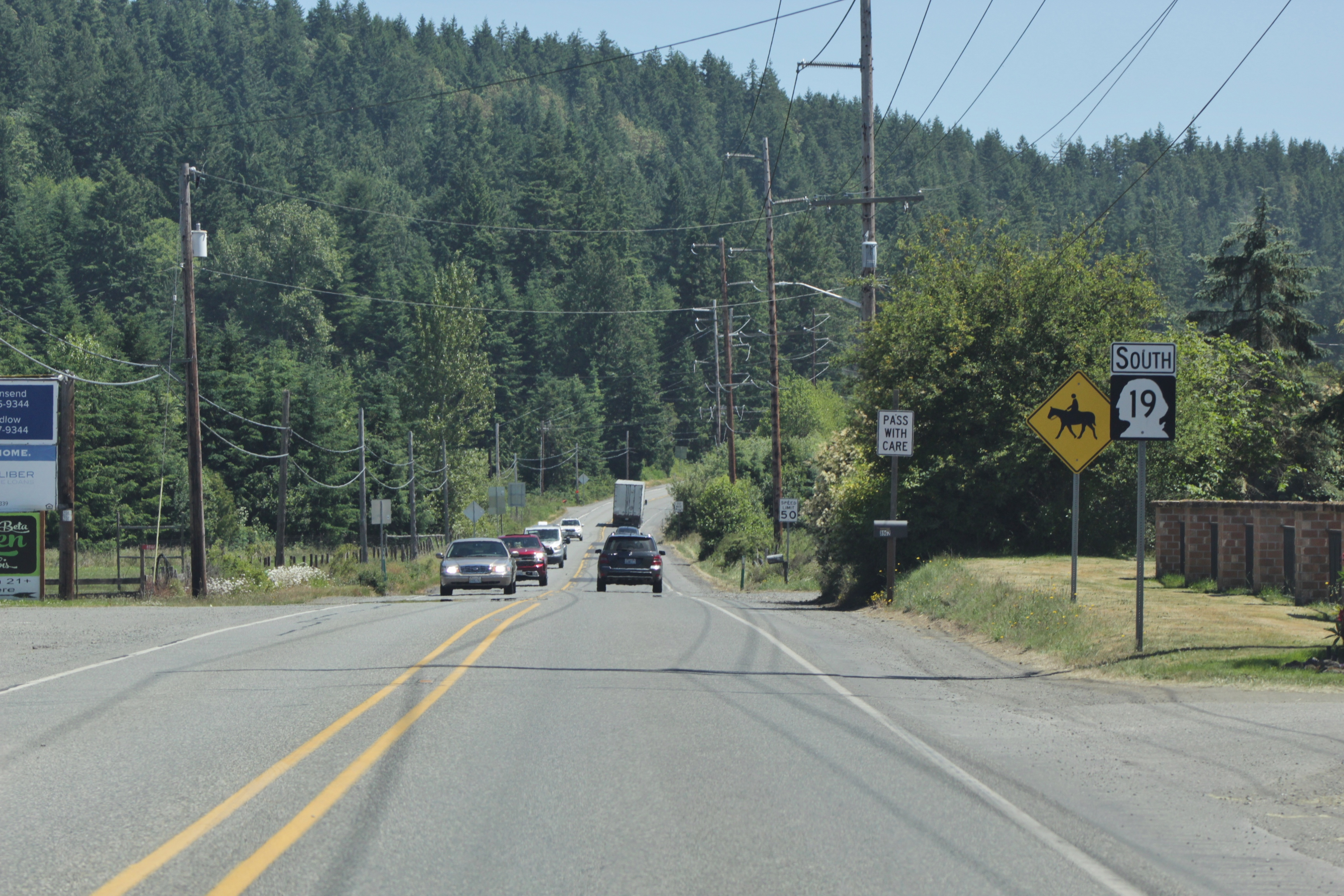
SR 19 southbound near Chimacum, Washington

SR 19 begins as Beaver Valley Road at an intersection with SR 104, a connector highway linking U.S. Route 101 to the Hood Canal Bridge, southwest of the census-designated place of Port Ludlow. The highway travels north as the western boundary of Port Ludlow and intersects Oak Bay Road, the primary access road for the community, before leaving Port Ludlow along Chimacum Creek to the west and Oak Bay to the east. SR 19 crosses Chimacum Creek into the unincorporated community of Chimacum and becomes Rhody Drive and continues north into Port Hadlock-Irondale and intersecting Ness Corner Road, signed as SR 116, a connector to Indian Island and Fort Flagler State Park to the east. The highway leaves Port Hadlock-Irondale as the Airport Cutoff Road and serves Jefferson County International Airport before ending at an intersection with SR 20 southwest of Port Townsend west of Fort Townsend State Park.

Every year, the Washington State Department of Transportation (WSDOT) conducts a series of surveys on its highways in the state to measure traffic volume. This is expressed in terms of annual average daily traffic (AADT), which is a measure of traffic volume for any average day of the year. In 2011, WSDOT calculated that between 6,400 and 13,000 vehicles per day used the highway, mostly in near the Jefferson County International Airport. SR 19 is designated as a part of the National Highway System from SR 104 to SR 116 and as a Highway of Statewide Significance for its whole route.

== History ==
SR 19 was designated in 1991 to serve the Jefferson County International Airport and connect to SR 116 in Port Hadlock-Irondale. The highway was formally added to the state highway system on April 1, 1992. The route of SR 19 roughly follows an existing unpaved road built by the 1950s and paved in the 1960s.

== Major intersections ==
The entire highway is in Jefferson County.

Location	mi	km	Destinations	Notes
	0.00	0.00	SR 104 – Bremerton, Port Angeles	Southern terminus
	10.68	17.19	SR 116 east (Ness Corner Road) – Mystery Bay, Fort Flagler	Western terminus of SR 116
	14.09	22.68	SR 20 – Port Townsend, Whidbey Island Ferry, Port Angeles	Northern terminus
1.000 mi = 1.609 km; 1.000 km = 0.621 mi
