= List of portages in North America =

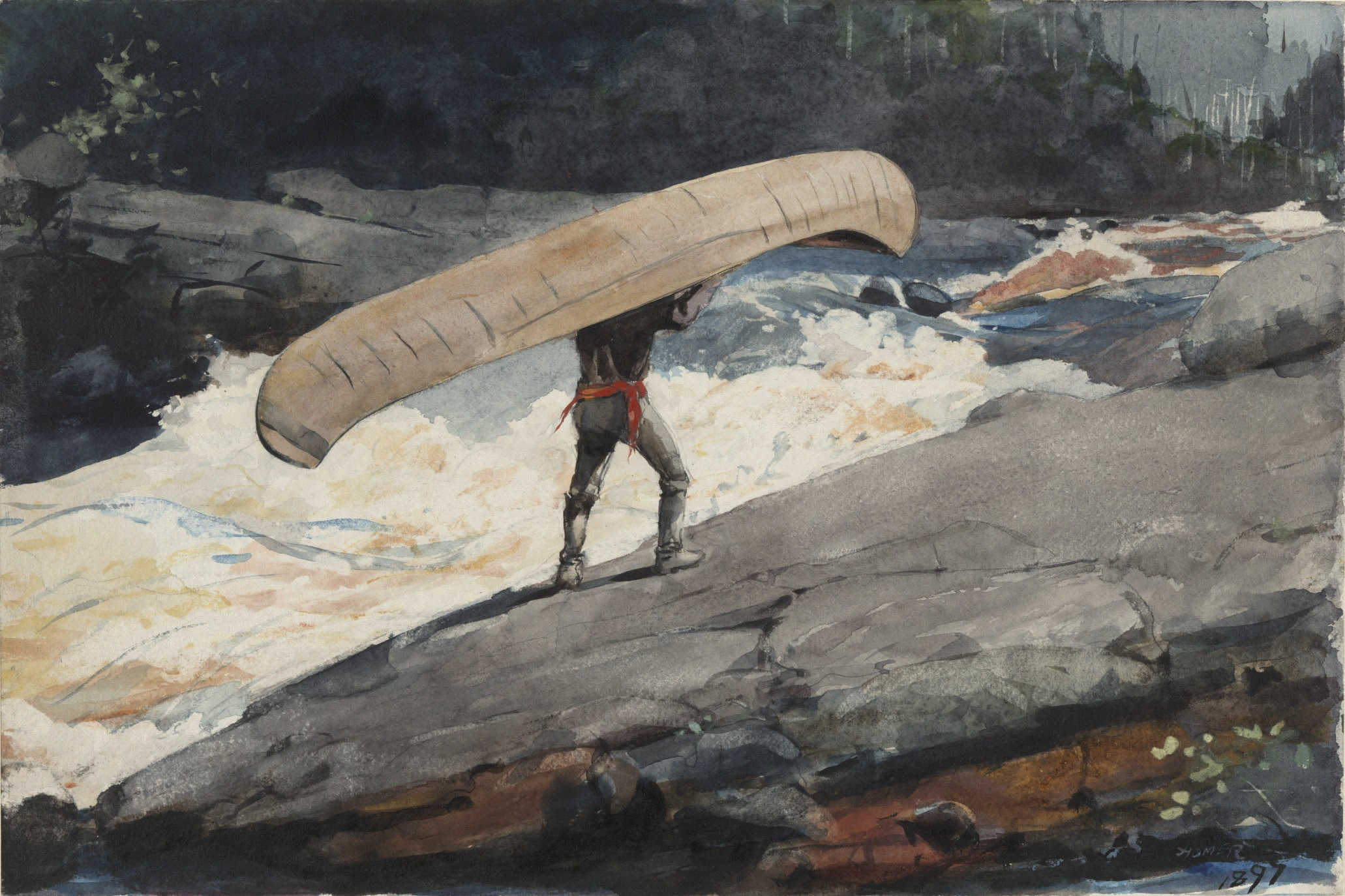
The Portage by Winslow Homer, 1897

Portages in North America usually began as animal tracks and were improved by tramping or blazing. In a few places iron-plated wooden rails were laid to take a handcart. Heavily used routes sometimes evolved into roads when sledges, rollers or oxen were used, as at Methye Portage. Sometimes railways were built (Champlain and St. Lawrence Railroad). The basic purpose of most canals is to avoid portages.

Places where portaging occurred often became temporary and then permanent settlements (such as Hull, Quebec; Sault Ste. Marie, Ontario; New Orleans, Louisiana; and Chicago, Illinois). The importance of free passage through portages found them included in laws and treaties. The Northwest Ordinance says "The navigable waters leading into the Mississippi and St. Lawrence, and the carrying places between the same, shall be common highways and forever free, as well to the inhabitants of the said territory as to the citizens of the United States..." The Treaty of Greenville between the U.S. and the Indian tribes of the area includes: "And the said Indian tribes will allow to the people of the United States a free passage by land and by water, as one and the other shall be found convenient, through their country,..." Then four portages are mentioned specifically. Portages are also used in the treaty to set boundaries ("The general boundary line between the lands of the United States and the lands of the said Indian tribes, shall begin at the mouth of Cayahoga river, and run thence up the same to the portage..."). One historically important fur trade portage is now Grand Portage National Monument. Recreational canoeing routes often include portages between lakes, for example, the Seven Carries route in Adirondack Park. Algonquin Park, Boundary Waters Canoe Area Wilderness and Sylvania Wilderness have famous portage routes.

Numerous portages were upgraded to carriageways and railways due to their economic importance. The Niagara Portage had a gravity railway in the 1760s. The passage between the Chicago and Des Plaines Rivers (and so between the Great Lakes and the Mississippi River systems) was through a short swamp portage which seasonally flooded and it is thought that a channel gradually developed unintentionally from the dragging of the boat bottoms. The 1835 Champlain and St. Lawrence Railroad connected the cities of New York and Montreal without needing to go through the Atlantic. The passage between Lake Superior and Lake Huron was by a portage dragway of greased rails with capstans until a railway was built in 1850 and a canal in 1855. The 5-mile-long Nosbonsing and Nipissing Railway was built just to carry logs between lakes on their way to the sawmill. Allegheny Portage Railroad and Morris Canal both used canal inclined planes to pass loaded boats through portages.

== Portages ==
Portage	Barrier	Status	Location
Giscome Portage	Pacific Basin–Arctic Basin divide	Partially preserved	Giscome Portage Trail Protected Area; 54.24°N 122.58°W
Athabasca Landing Trail	Arctic Divide	Abandoned	Alberta; 54.1756°N 113.4629°W
Methye Portage	Arctic Divide	Preserved	Clearwater River Provincial Park; 56.5741°N 109.7°W
Height of Land Portage (Boundary Waters)	Laurentian Divide	In use	La Verendrye Provincial Park and Boundary Waters Canoe Area Wilderness; 48.102°N 90.567°W
Height of Land Portage (St. Louis County)	Laurentian Divide	Abandoned	St. Louis County, Minnesota; 47.6136°N 92.3017°W
Savanna Portage	St. Lawrence River Divide	Preserved	Savanna Portage State Park; 46.8375°N 93.1567°W
Chicago Portage	St. Lawrence River Divide	Canalized	Chicago Portage National Historic Site; Cook County, Illinois; 41.805°N 87.8028°W
Chautauqua Portage	St. Lawrence River Divide	Replaced by road	Chautauqua County, New York; 42.2940909°N 79.5567731°W
Oneida Carry	St. Lawrence River Divide	Canalized	Oneida County, New York; 43.22°N 75.47°W
Wauona Trail	St. Lawrence River Divide	Canalized	Portage, Wisconsin; 43.5472°N 89.4437°W
Great Falls Portage	Great Falls of the Missouri River	Abandoned	Cascade County, Montana; 47.531°N 111.151°W
Grand Portage	Pigeon River Rapids	Preserved	Grand Portage National Monument; 47.996°N 89.734°W
Grand Portage of the St. Louis River	St. Louis River Rapids	Partially preserved	Jay Cooke State Park; 46.6497°N 92.3307°W
Toronto Carrying-Place Trail	Lake Ontario–Lake Simcoe divide	Abandoned	Toronto and Regional Municipality of York; 43.95°N 79.6°W
Scugog carrying place	Lake Ontario–Lake Scugog divide	Abandoned	Regional Municipality of Durham; 43.98°N 78.9°W
Nine Mile Portage	Kempenfelt Bay–Nottawasaga Bay divide	Abandoned	Simcoe County; 44.38°N 79.79°W
Frog Portage	Churchill River Basin–Saskatchewan River Basin divide	In use	Saskatchewan; 55.3986°N 103.533°W
Keweenaw Portage	Keweenaw Peninsula	Canalized	Houghton County, Michigan; 47.222°N 88.624°W
Chimacum Portage	Port Townsend Bay–Oak Bay divide	Canalized	Jefferson County, Washington; 48.0287°N 122.72836°W
Niagara Portage	Niagara Falls	Abandoned	New York (state); 43.1339°N 79.04535°W

== Settlements named for being on a portage ==
Sometimes the settlements were named for being on a portage. Some places in the United States and Canada so named are:

- Cranberry Portage, Manitoba
- Giscome Portage, British Columbia
- Grand Portage, Minnesota
- Neyaashiinigmiing 27 Indian reserve, Ontario ([o]nig[a]miing being the Ojibwe word for "at\by a portage")
- Onigum, Minnesota (onigam being the Ojibwe word for "portage")
- Portage, Indiana
- Portage, Michigan
- Portage, Montana
- Portage, Nova Scotia
- Portage, Pennsylvania
- Portage, Wisconsin
- Portage Bay, Washington
- Portage County, Ohio
- Portage County, Wisconsin
- Portage Park, Chicago
- Portage-du-Fort, Quebec
- Portage la Prairie, Manitoba (portage between the Assiniboine River and Lake Manitoba)
- Rat Portage, Ontario
- Seton Portage, British Columbia
- Bayou Portage, Louisiana

Names with portage appear on various other geographical features, including road and lakes, as in Portage Lake. In Hull, Quebec a major street is named promenade du Portage as the city is the head of uninterrupted navigation from Montréal on the Ottawa River and one must portage around the Chaudière Rapids.

== Portage races ==
The area of the Boundary Waters Canoe Area Wilderness west of Grand Portage, Minnesota, carries rich history of canoeing and portaging. The city of Ely, Minnesota, one of the main entry areas to the wilderness, hosts the Ely Marathon each September that has a canoe portage category, making it the only marathon portage in the country.
