= Marrowstone Point Light =

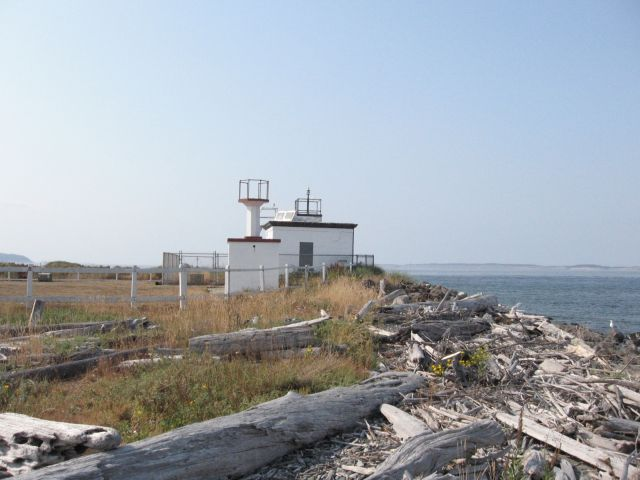
- Location: Fort Flagler, Washington
- Coordinates: 48.1018°N 122.6879°W

Tower
- Constructed: 1888
- Foundation: Surface
- Construction: Concrete
- Automated: 1962
- Height: 28 feet

Light
- First lit: 1912
- Focal height: 8.5 m (28 ft)
- Range: 7 nmi (13 km; 8.1 mi)
- Characteristic: White light occulting every 4 s

The Marrowstone Point Light is an active navigational aid overlooking Admiralty Inlet at the northern tip of Marrowstone Island, Jefferson County, Washington, in the United States. It lies adjacent to but is not part of Fort Flagler State Park; it may be viewed from the park's beach but is not open to the public.

== History ==
The Marrowstone Point Lighthouse is on Marrowstone Point, which is located at the northern tip of Marrowstone Island and forms the eastern entrance to Port Townsend Bay. The point was first marked by a lens lantern on a pole in 1888. A fog bell was added to the station in 1896, and a one-and-a-half-story dwelling was constructed on the point to house Marrowstone Point's first station keeper, Osmond Hale Morgan (1826–1907), a sea captain, who came from Whidbey Island with his wife, Frances Elizabeth (Avery) Morgan (1833–1899), and five children. In 1912, the light was placed on a small, concrete structure.

After mariners complained that the fog bell at the point was often inaudible, a small, square cement building outfitted with three large trumpets was put into service in 1918. The light was also mounted on top of the fog signal building.

The grounds are now the site of the U.S. Geological Survey's Marrowstone Marine Field Station, with the original keeper's quarters used for office and living space.
