= Chimacum, Washington =

Unincorporated community in Washington, United States

- Unincorporated community
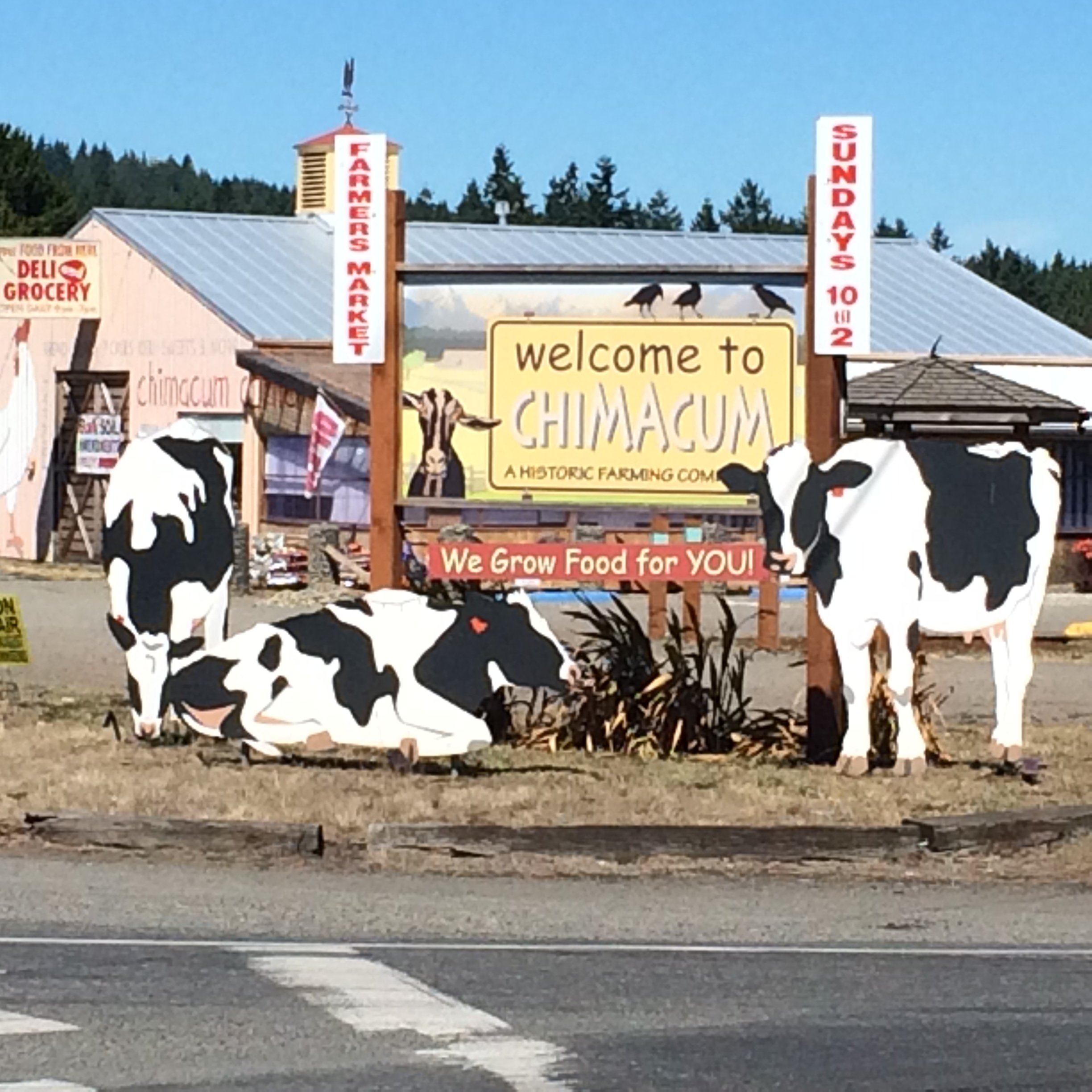
- Chimacum farmer's market

- Location within Washington (state) Location within the United States
- Coordinates: 48°00′39″N 122°46′08″W
- Country: United States
- State: Washington
- County: Jefferson
- Elevation: 125 ft (38 m)
- Time zone: UTC-8 (Pacific (PST))
  - Summer (DST): UTC-7 (PDT)
- Area code(s): 360, 564
- GNIS feature ID: 1517710

Chimacum is an unincorporated community in Jefferson County, Washington, United States, located in the center of the primary agricultural area of the eastern Olympic Peninsula. As of the 2020 census, Chimacum is not listed as a CDP despite being a prominent population center in the area.

== History ==
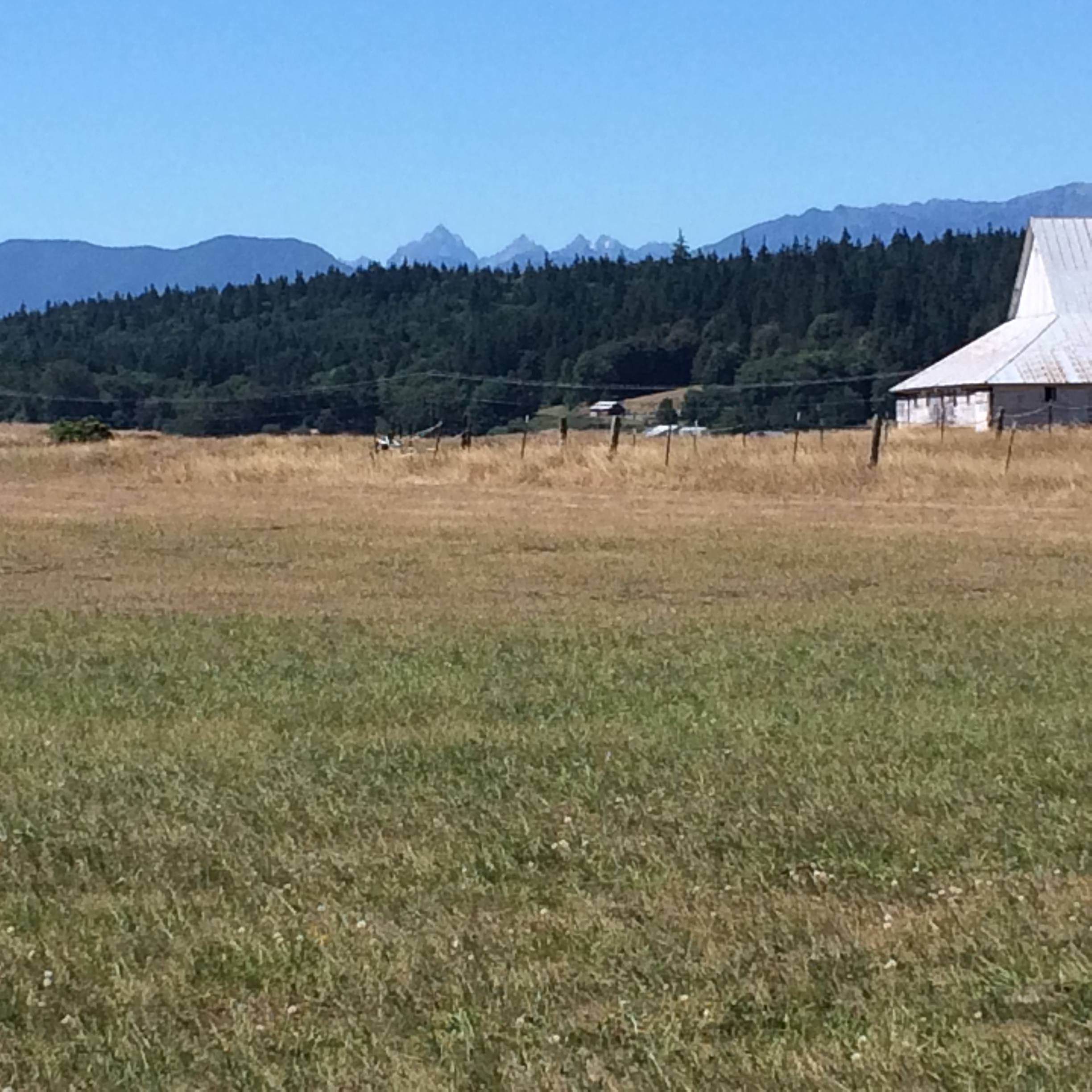
Olympic Mountains from the Chimacum Valley

The community was named after the Chimakum (also spelled Chemakum or Chimacum) group of Indigenous Americans that lived there until the late 19th century but are now extinct as a distinct cultural group. Chimacum Creek is named after the Chimakum, a Native American people known to themselves as Aqokúlo, who lived on the northeastern portion of the Olympic Peninsula through the mid-19th century and whose economy, culture and religion were based on salmon fishing. Their primary settlements were on Port Townsend Bay, on the Quimper Peninsula, and Port Ludlow Bay to the south. According to tradition, the Chimakum were a remnant of a Quileute band who had been carried away in their canoes by a great flood through a passageway in the Olympic Mountains and deposited on the other side of the peninsula. In 1855 the Twana and Chimakum, along with the Klallam, signed the Point No Point Treaty, which established a reservation at the mouth of the Skokomish River near the southern end of Hood Canal. One of the Chimakum signatories of the treaty was Chief Kulkakhan, also known as General Pierce. After this, most Chimakum people merged into the S’Klallam and Skokomish tribes, where their descendants still live today.

== Economy ==
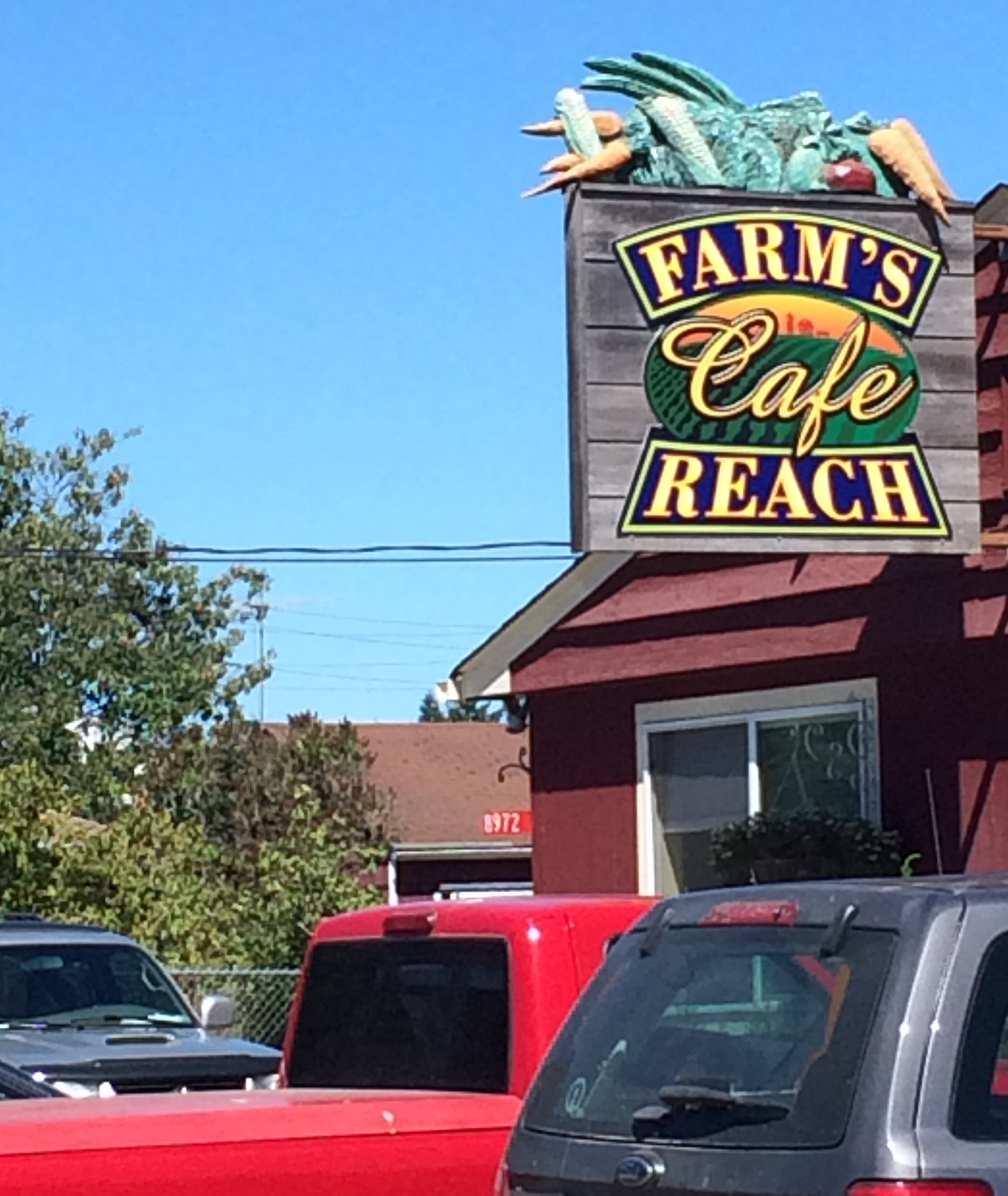
A Chimacum localvore eatery.

The Chimacum Valley remains and maintains an identity as a progressive agricultural area with many small locally owned farmsteads, a full-service farmstand grocer carrying locally produced goods, and a community farmers' market held from June to October each Sunday from 10 AM to 2 PM. The area is also served by a local branch of The National Grange of the Order of Patrons of Husbandry, which celebrated its 100th anniversary in 2018.

In May 2014 the Jefferson County Land Trust in collaboration with Washington State University have designated over 15 acres of undeveloped agricultural land in central Chimacum to be reserved as incubator farms and called the Chimacum Commons. This project envisions an educational and trade hub offering both affordable, clustered local housing and a workspace for agricultural and horticultural science students and small-scale farming professionals to develop, grow, and master their crafts.

== Education ==
Chimacum is the home of Chimacum Schools' main campus, which serves the unincorporated communities of east Jefferson County to the south of Port Townsend and north of Quilcene, including Chimacum itself, Port Hadlock, Irondale, Marrowstone Island, Oak Bay, Paradise Bay, Port Ludlow, and Shine.

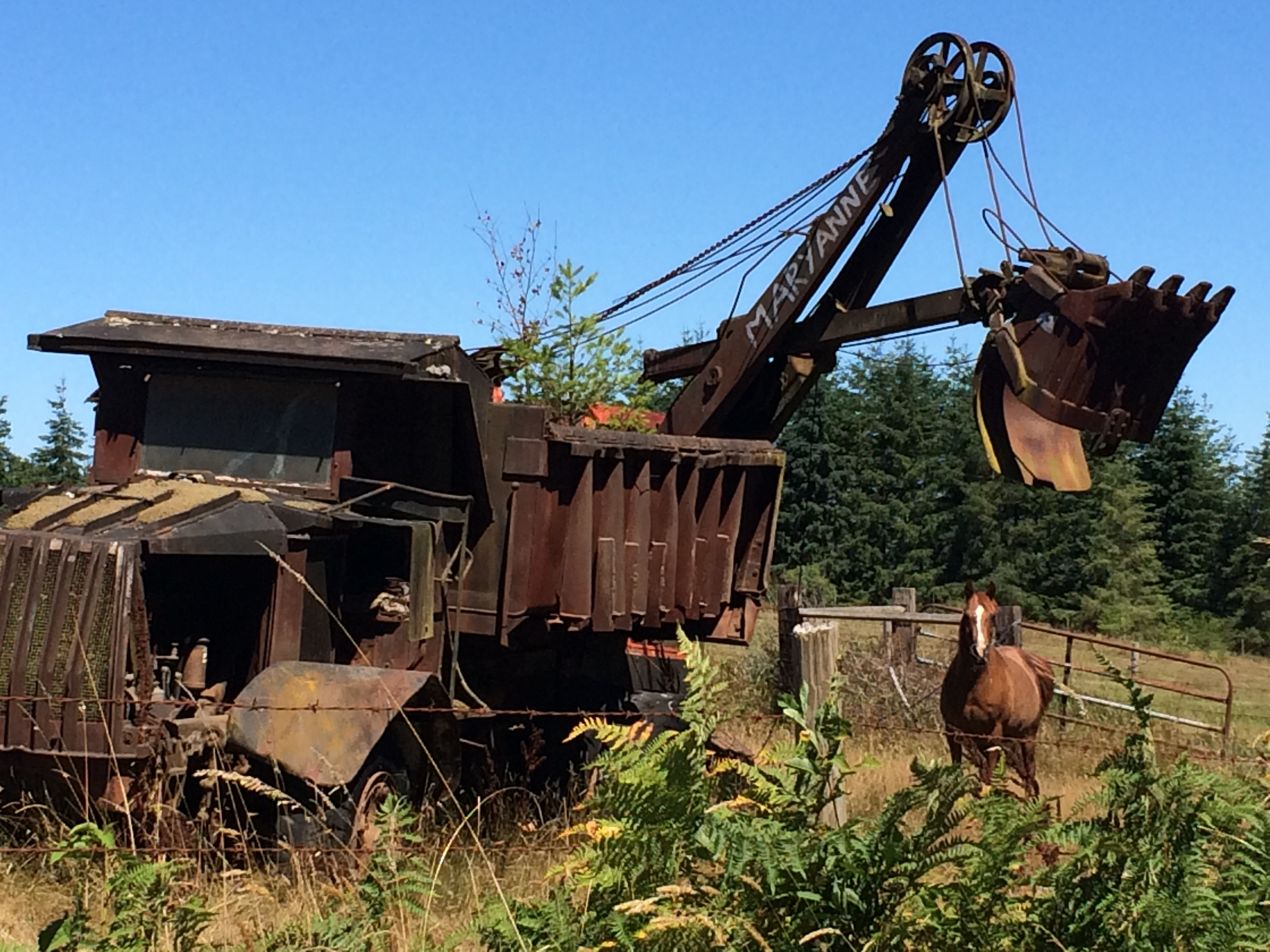
Rustic Folk Art

== Media ==
Betty MacDonald's book The Egg and I (1945), upon which the Ma and Pa Kettle films were based, described the author's experiences on a chicken farm on the road leading west from Beaver Valley Road (State Route 19). This road is now named "Egg and I Road".

The psychedelic folk singer-songwriter Linda Perhacs lived in Chimacum for a time in the 1960s with her then-husband. She wrote the song "Chimacum Rain"—the opening track on her debut album Parallelograms (1970)—with lyrics inspired by the landscape and her conflicted feelings that she was ready to end her marriage and live independently. In a retrospective on her musical career, Perhacs said the song was "about the dilemma between your love for someone and your realization that there must be a parting" and said "Chimacum is a very rainy territory, so every day we would see drops of rain and I just started to write about the beautiful drops of rain and the beauty of the ferns and the trees. The essences up there are so natural and so magnificent. It was a choice place to live and a great privilege."
