= Portage Canal (disambiguation) =

Portage Canal may refer to:

- Portage Canal (Wisconsin), part of the Fox–Wisconsin Waterway
- Portage Canal (Michigan), part of the Keweenaw Waterway
- Portage Canal (Washington), also known as the Port Townsend Ship Canal
