= USS LST-544 =

1944 LST-542-class tank landing ship

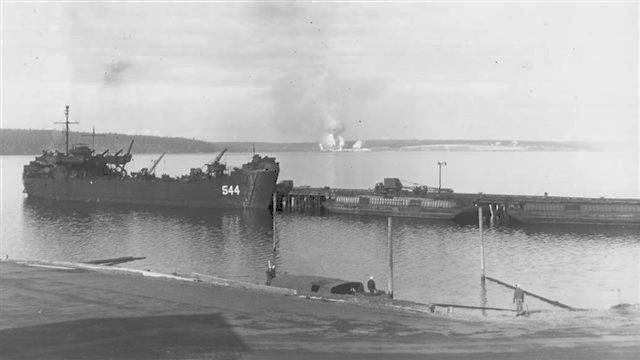
- USS LST-544, at left, moored at United States Naval Magazine, Indian Island, Washington, with smoke from the Port Townsend, Washington, paper mill in the background.

History

United States
- Name: USS LST-544
- Builder: Missouri Valley Bridge and Iron Company, Evansville, Indiana
- Laid down: 8 December 1943
- Launched: 4 February 1944
- Sponsored by: Mrs. Maudie M. Marlow
- Commissioned: 16 March 1944
- Decommissioned: 9 August 1946
- Stricken: 25 September 1946
- Fate: Sold for scrapping 23 June 1947

General characteristics
- Class & type: LST-542-class tank landing ship
- Displacement: 1,625 long tons (1,651 t) light; 4,080 long tons (4,145 t) full (seagoing draft with 1,675-ton load
- Length: 328 ft (100 m)
- Beam: 50 ft (15 m)
- Draft: Unloaded 2 ft 4 in (0.71 m) forward; 7 ft 6 in (2.29 m) aft; Full load: 8 ft 2 in (2.49 m) forward; 14 ft 1 in (4.29 m) aft; Landing with 500-ton load: 3 ft 11 in (1.19 m) forward; 9 ft 10 in (3.00 m) aft
- Propulsion: Two diesel engines, two shafts, twin rudders
- Speed: 12 knots (22 km/h; 14 mph)
- Range: 24,000 nautical miles (44,448 kilometerss) at 9 knots while displacing 3,960 tons
- Boats & landing craft carried: 6 x LCVPs
- Capacity: 1,600-1,900 tons cargo depending on mission
- Troops: 14 officers, 131 enlisted men
- Complement: 9 officers, 120 enlisted men
- Armament: 2 × twin 40 mm gun mounts; 4 × single 40-millimeter gun mounts; 12 × 20 mm guns

USS LST-544 was a United States Navy LST-542-class tank landing ship in commission from 1944 to 1946.

== Construction and commissioning ==
LST-544 was laid down on 8 December 1943 at Evansville, Indiana, by the Missouri Valley Bridge and Iron Company. She was launched on 4 February 1944, sponsored by Mrs. Maudie M. Marlow, and commissioned on 16 March 1944.

== Service history ==
LST-544 was not involved in combat operations during World War II.

== Decommissioning and disposal ==
LST-544 was decommissioned on 9 August 1946 and stricken from the Navy List on 25 September 1946. On 23 June 1947, she was sold to Willamette Iron & Steel Company for scrapping.
