= Fort Flagler State Park =

State historic park in Washington state, United States

Fort Flagler Historical State Park
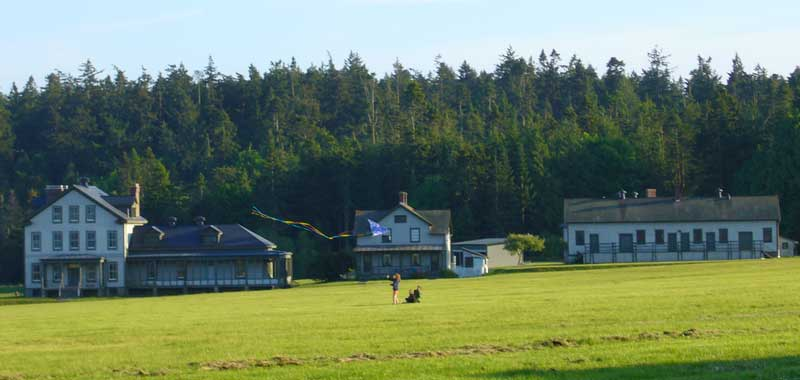
- The parade ground at Fort Flagler State Park, with the hospital building (left) and ranger residence (middle) in the background.

- Location within Washington (state) Location within the United States
- Location: Jefferson County, Washington, United States
- Coordinates: 48°05′50″N 122°41′42″W
- Area: 1,451 acres (587 ha)
- Elevation: 102 ft (31 m)
- Established: 1955
- Administrator: Washington State Parks and Recreation Commission
- Website: Official website
- Fort Flagler
- U.S. National Register of Historic Places
- U.S. Historic district
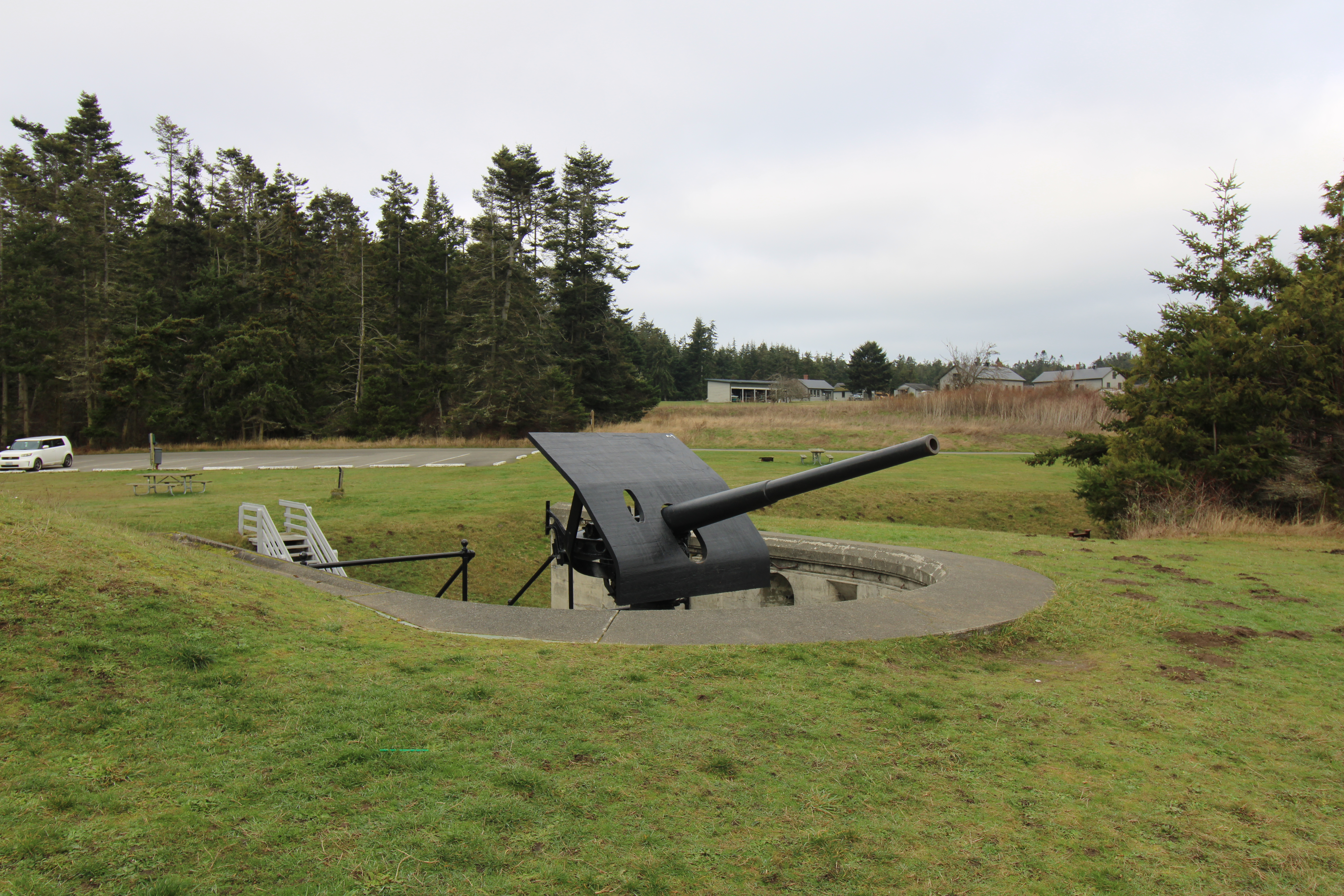
- Gun emplacement at Fort Flagler
- Location: Jefferson County, SE of Port Townsend on Marrowstone Island
- Nearest city: Port Townsend, Washington
- NRHP reference No.: 76001882
- Added to NRHP: May 3, 1976

Fort Flagler Historical State Park is a public recreation area that occupies the site of Fort Flagler, a former United States Army fort at the northern end of Marrowstone Island in Washington. The state park occupies 1,451 acres (587 ha) south of the entrance to Admiralty Inlet, and the Marrowstone Point Light stands adjacent. Port Townsend is visible to the northwest, the cranes at the Navy base on Indian Island to the west, and Whidbey Island to the east across Admiralty Inlet. Flagler Road (SR 116) terminates at the park entrance.

== History ==
Fort Flagler was a Coast Artillery fort that along with Fort Worden and Fort Casey once guarded Admiralty Inlet, the nautical entrance to Puget Sound. Admiralty Inlet was considered so strategic to the defense of Puget Sound that the three forts were placed at the entrance with huge guns creating a "triangle of fire." This military strategy was built on the theory that the three fortresses would thwart any invasion attempt by sea. Fort Flagler was established in 1897 and activated in 1899. The post was named for Brigadier General Daniel Webster Flagler, an American Civil War veteran who served as the Army's Chief of Ordnance. The fort was closed in June 1953. The property was purchased as a state park in 1955.

== Amenities and activities ==
Fort Flagler has hiking and biking trails, campsites, group campsites, boat launches, and historical buildings where visitors can stay - the Hospital Steward's House, the Waterway House, and the North and South Non-Commissioned Officers' Quarters. The park's museum features exhibits about the history of the fort. A schedule of guided tours is available. The park plays host to the annual conferences and meetings of many area cultural and athletic groups.
