= Port Townsend Ship Canal =

Canal in Jefferson County, Washington

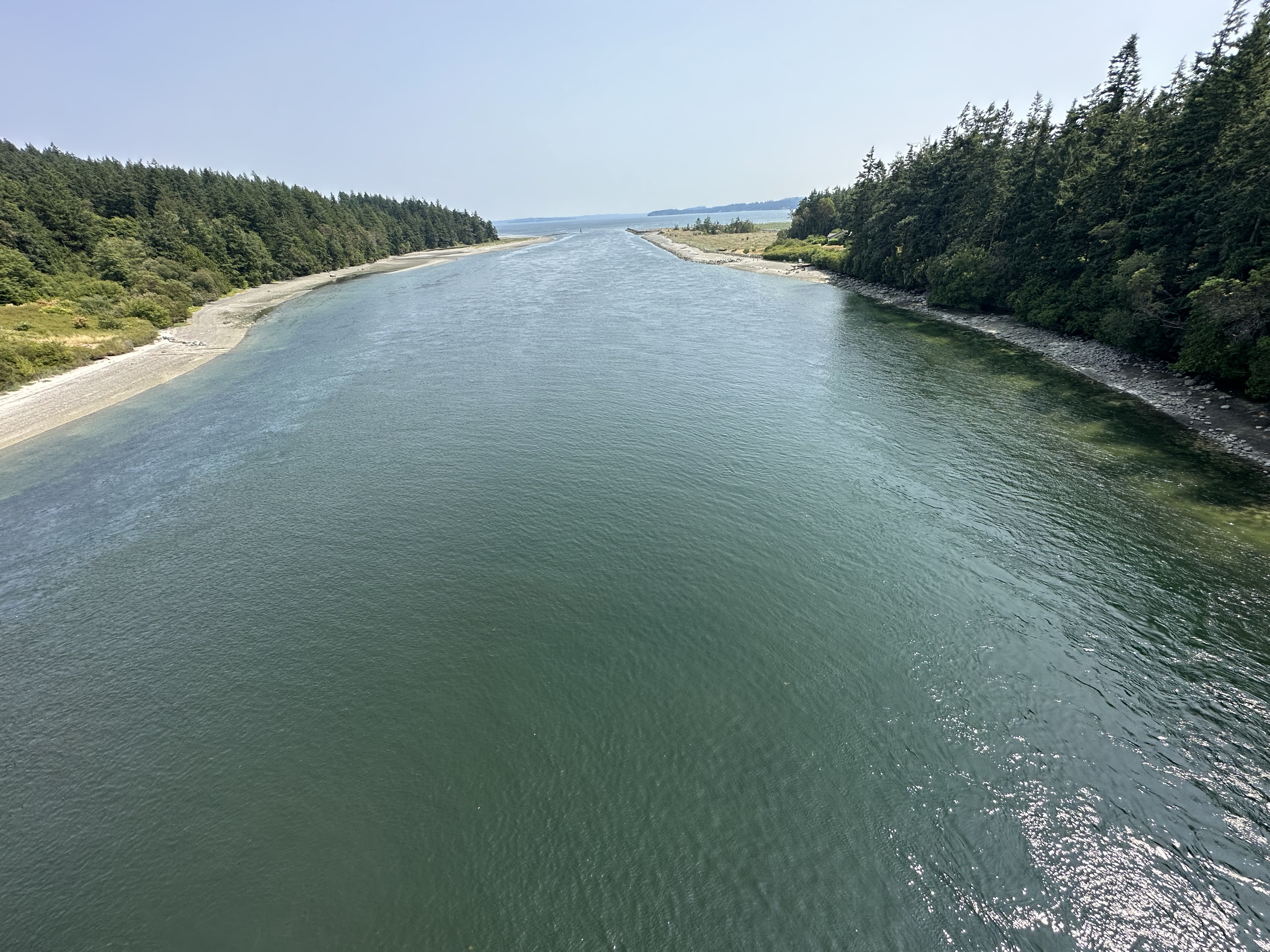
- Port Townsend Ship Canal
- Interactive map of Port Townsend Ship Canal
- Location: Jefferson County, Washington
- Country: United States
- Coordinates: 48°01′49″N 122°43′46″W

Specifications
- Length: 0.9 miles (1.4 km)
- Locks: None
- Status: Open

History
- Date of first use: July 8, 1915

Geography
- Start point: Port Townsend Bay
- End point: Oak Bay

The Port Townsend Ship Canal (also known as the Portage Canal) is a 4,800-foot (1,500 m) canal connecting Port Townsend Bay and Oak Bay in Jefferson County, Washington. Built in 1915, the canal separates Indian Island from the Quimper Peninsula of mainland Washington. State Route 116 crosses the only bridge over the canal. There are no locks.

== History ==
Historically, Indian Island and Marrowstone Island were known collectively by settlers as the Craven Peninsula and later as the Scow Peninsula. This peninsula was attached to the mainland by a 450-foot (140 m) wide gravel ridge that lay 3 feet (0.91 m) above the waterline at high tide. The Chimakum would use this relatively narrow stretch of land as a canoe portage between Port Townsend Bay and Oak Bay, a route which became known in English as the Chimacum Portage.

The U.S. Army Corps of Engineers first proposed a canal at this location in 1850. A site survey was completed in 1889. In 1914 Congress appropriated $64,000 for the project and construction commenced. The canal was then built by dredging and blasting the Chimacum Portage, giving rise to the "Portage Canal" name. The waterway officially opened on July 8, 1915, at a total cost of $73,330. Its initial dimensions were 4,800 feet (1,500 m) long, 75 feet (23 m) wide, 15 feet (4.6 m) deep.

Ferry service across the canal began in 1920. It began transporting cars in 1923 and was made free of charge in 1937. The U.S. Navy later started its own ferry after building a base on Indian Island.

Ferries were eventually replaced by the Portage Canal Bridge, dedicated January 11, 1952. The bridge now carries Washington State Route 116 and remains the only crossing of the canal.
