= Chimacum Creek =

Stream in Jefferson County, Washington, U.S.

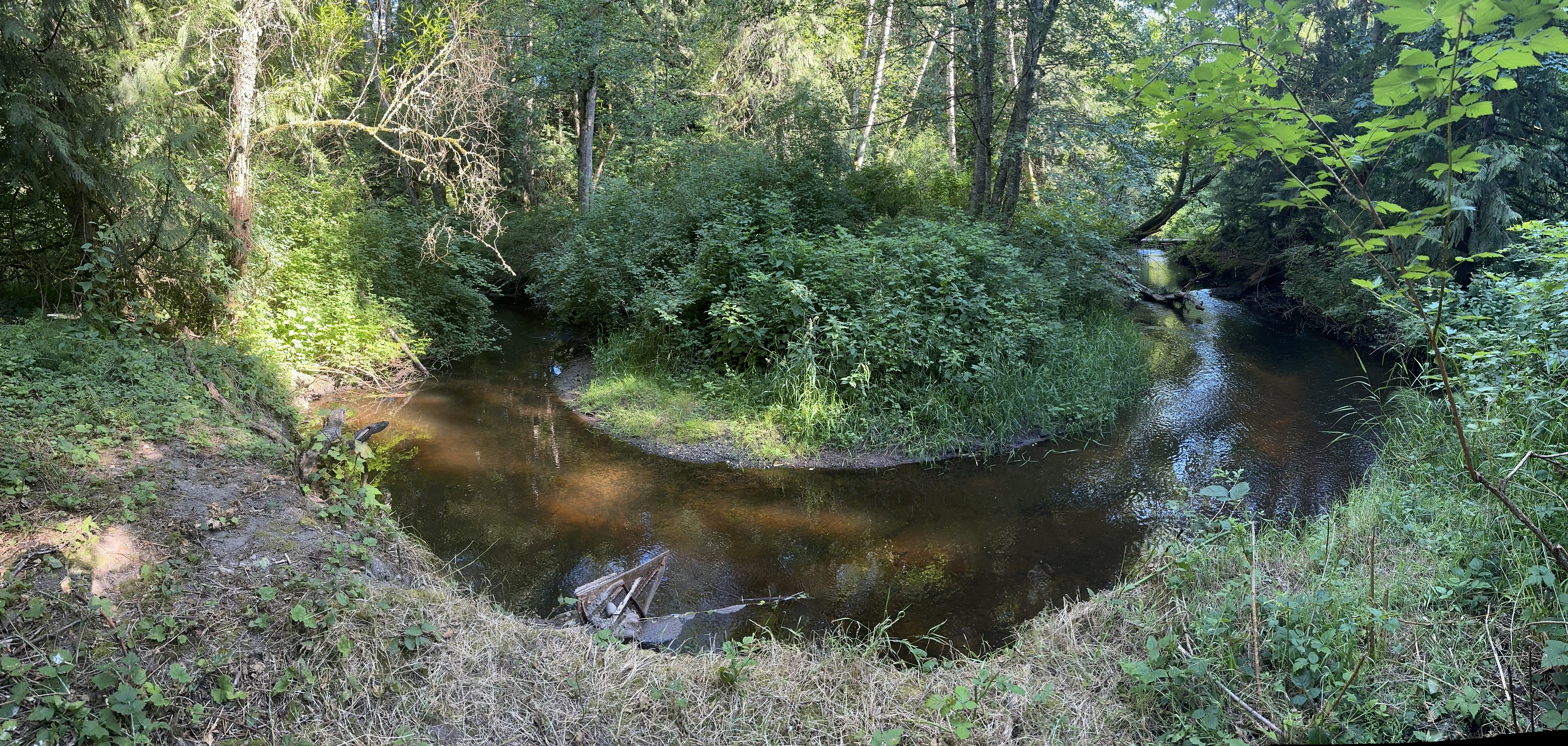
- Chimacum Creek near Port Hadlock-Irondale

Location
- Country: United States
- State: Washington
- County: Jefferson County

Physical characteristics
- Source: Delanty Lake
  - coordinates: 47°58′21″N 122°50′53″W
- Mouth: Port Townsend Bay
  - location: Port Hadlock-Irondale
  - coordinates: 48°02′56″N 122°46′17″W
- Length: 13.1 mi (21.1 km)
- Basin size: 37 sq mi (96 km^{2})

Chimacum Creek is a stream in Jefferson County, Washington, United States. Located on the base of the Quimper Peninsula in the northeast of the larger Olympic Peninsula, the main stem (also known as West Chimacum Creek) originates from a series of springs and ponds in the forested hills south of Discovery Bay. It flows south from its source before turning east and eventually north, taking in many small tributaries before it enters the broad Chimacum Valley, an agricultural region where the stream has been extensively channelized. After taking in its largest tributary, the East Fork Chimacum, near the community of Chimacum, it enters a tight ravine where it meets the sea in the community of Port Hadlock-Irondale, creating a small estuary and an area of intertidal wetland as it enters Port Townsend Bay.

The topography of the watershed was shaped heavily by the advance and retreat of the Cordilleran ice sheet during the Last Glacial Maximum, which deposited large amounts of glacial outwash and sedimentary material. The area was the traditional lands of the eponymous Chemakum people, who were devastated by disease and massacres by surrounding groups shortly prior to Euro-American colonization in the 1850s. The watershed was dredged and channelized during the early 20th century, turning the formerly meandering and heavily forested creek into a relatively straight channel through the farms along the valley. Environmental restoration projects in the late 20th and early 21st centuries have helped protect the spawning runs of coho salmon to the creek.

== Course ==
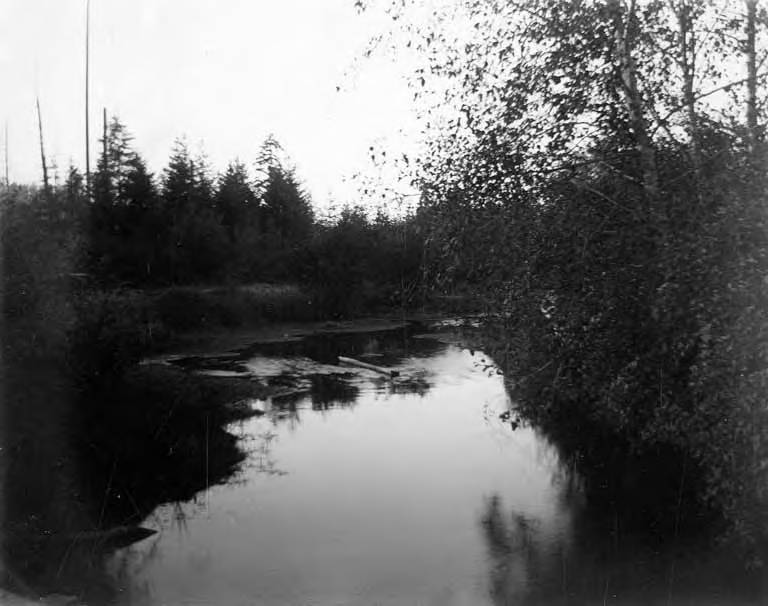
Stretch of Chimacum Creek near Port Hadlock, c. 1898

Chimacum Creek is located on the Quimper Peninsula, a small peninsula on the northeastern side of the Olympic Peninsula in Western Washington. The main stem creek (also known as West Chimacum Creek or the West Fork Chimacum Creek) originates in the forested hills to the southwest of the town of Port Hadlock, and flows for a total of 13.1 miles (21.1 km).

For most of the year, the mainstem discharges out of Delanty Lake; however, during the summer this course runs dry, and it instead forms from springs and seeps. It flows first south and then east via a small canyon through the unincorporated community of Center. It then flows northeast through the Center Valley, receiving Barnstorm Creek as a tributary 3.5 miles (5.6 km) from its source. At about 7.7 miles (12.4 km) from its source, it takes in Naylor Creek, which drains nearby Gibbs Lake. About a mile later it takes in another tributary stream, Putaansuu Creek.

In the unincorporated community of Chimacum, the creek receives its largest tributary, the East Fork Chimacum Creek. The 5.5-mile (8.9 km) long East Fork originates to the southwest in a group of forested wetlands at an elevation of about 180 ft (55 m), flowing through Beaver Valley before its confluence with the mainstem. It then flows north for another 2.3 miles (3.7 km) through the community of Port Hadlock-Irondale. It enters a tight ravine for the last 1.3 miles (2.1 km) of its course, turning east and draining into Port Townsend Bay. A small area of salt marsh and a lagoon is located at the river's embayment into the ocean, on the last 0.2 miles (0.32 km) of its course.

== Hydrology ==
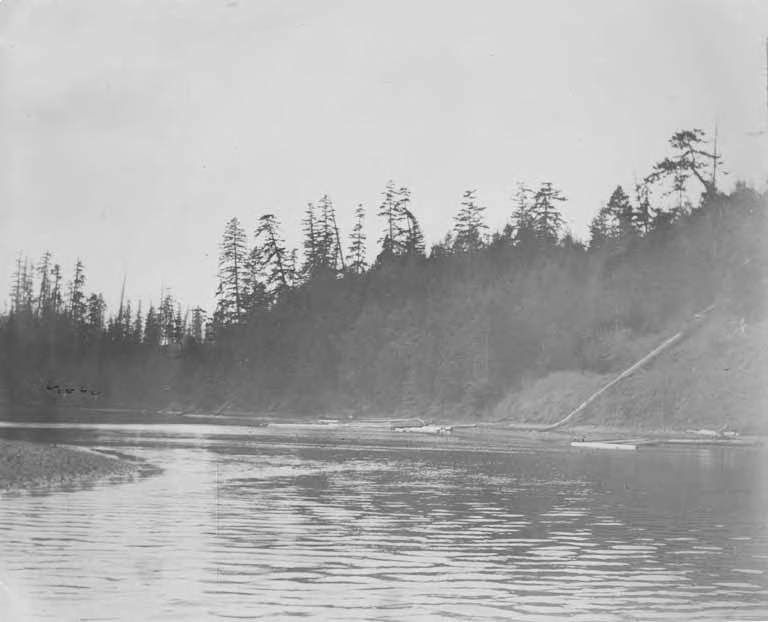
The mouth of Chimacum Creek, c. 1898

Chimacum Creek has the largest watershed of the Quimper Peninsula, approximately 37 square miles (96 km^{2}), (Note: Reports in 1996 and 2011 give an area of 37 mi^{2} (96 km^{2}) for the watershed, while a 2002 report gives this figure as 33 mi^{2} (85 km^{2}).) draining the Chimacum Valley and an area of surrounding lowland hills. Both Chimacum Creek and its east fork have a shallow slope. The valleys of both creeks have sequences of thick, poorly-drained soils with large amounts of organic material, allowing for extensive agriculture. Almost all lowland areas in the valley have been subject to clearing, dredging, and channelization.

There are five small lakes in the basin—Anderson, Beausite, Delanty, Gibbs, and Peterson. Wetlands are abundant in the watershed, although many have been lost due to human activities and land modifications. This is especially prevalent in the upland areas of the basin, where large areas of former wetland were converted into agricultural land.

The watershed lies within the rain shadow of the Olympic Mountains, decreasing annual precipitation in comparison to the western portion of the peninsula. The southern portions of the basin, near the edge of the rain shadow, receive about 30 inches (76 cm) of rain per year, while the northern portions only receive about 20 inches (51 cm). Summers can be very dry, with less than an inch of rain per month on average during July and August. The area has a temperate marine climate, with warm summers and cool winters.

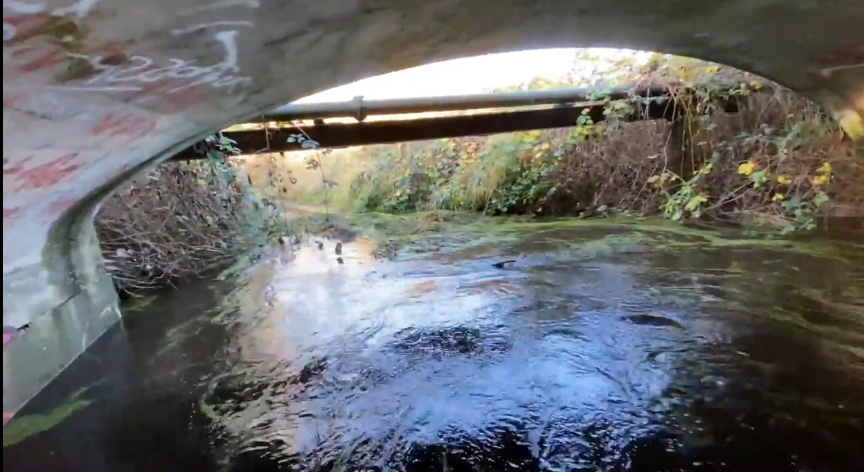
The creek running under a bridge near Port Hadlock-Irondale

The embayment at the river's mouth is a long tidal channel, with areas of tidal marsh. The delta measures about 5.2 acres (2.1 ha) in area, and now lacks any encroaching roads, jetties, or dikes.

=== Water quality ===
The greatest water quality concern in the Chimacum watershed is the contamination of the creek by livestock manure, which risks the spread of pathogens into the water. Monitoring of fecal coliform bacteria was intermittently carried out in the watershed from 1988 to 2012, showing bacteria levels above state regulations at almost all testing stations. Concentrations in downstream areas has declined over time, but continues to violate safety standards as of 2015.

Oxygen saturation levels, for which low levels can be particularly dangerous to salmon, vary greatly in the creek over the course of any given year, as well as between years. The nutrient-rich peaty soils of the watershed and large amounts of direct sunlight allow for extensive vegetation and algae growth in the creek; this results in higher oxygen concentrations during the day (as plants photosynthesize) and lower amounts at night (as they respire). Plant decomposition is a major cause of low oxygen saturation in the creek.

High turbidity (fluid cloudiness) levels were noted in the creek in 2010–11 and 2013–14, possibly due to decaying vegetation. Contemporary pH testing generally found the creek's water to be slightly basic, between 7.0 and 7.5. During this period, many testing stations on the main stem showed high summer water temperatures. One station upstream of the confluence with Putaansuu Creek had an average daily temperature for July and August of 68.2 °F (20.1 °C), the highest in the watershed. Average temperatures decreased slightly on both the main stem and east fork from the 1990s to 2010s.

Nitrate-nitrogen levels between 0 and to 6.5 mg per liter have been observed in the watershed, below the Environmental Protection Agency's maximum safe allowance of 10 mg per liter. Testing during the 2000s revealed consistently high levels at a station on East Chimacum Creek, found to be highest during December. Sources of nitrate and nitrogen in the watershed include soil, manure, artificial fertilizer, septic drainage, and automobile exhaust. Local agriculture and industry are the dominant sources of nitrogen and phosphorus in the watershed.

=== Flow ===
Roughly 20–30% of the average flow of the system is contributed by the East Fork, with the remainder contributed by the mainstem (West Chimacum Creek). For 2024–2025, a monitoring station near the mouth of the creek reported a median flow rate of 11.2 cubic feet (320 L) per second. The highest mean flow rate for a single day was in late December, at 189 cubic feet (5,400 L) per second, while the lowest was in late July, at 1.3 cubic feet (37 L) per second.

About 16,405 acre-feet (20,235,000 m^{3}) per year of groundwater recharge occurs in the watershed, while about 9,536 acre-feet (11,762,000 m^{3}) is discharged into the creek or used by residents. The remainder of surplus groundwater recharge likely flows into springs, seeps, and nearby saltwater. Groundwater recharge is boosted by human activities, including septic tank usage and agricultural activities.

== Geology ==
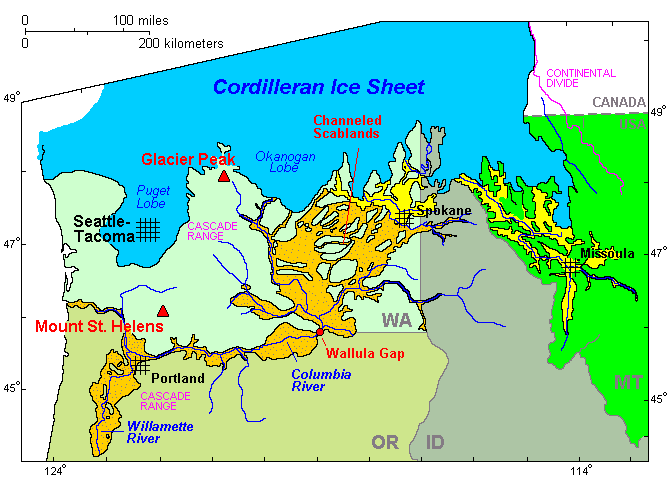
The Pacific Northwest and the Puget Lobe near the end of the Fraser Glaciation

From about 200,000 years ago, the Cordilleran ice sheet (a large continental ice sheet covering much of North America) made at least six advances and retreats throughout the Puget Lowland. The final of these was the Vashon Stade of the Fraser Glaciation, lasting from around 19,000 to 16,000 years ago during the Last Glacial Maximum. Glacial ice in the region reached a maximum depth of around 4,000 feet (1,200 m). This event heavily disrupted the topography of the region. Today, much of the region is composed of narrow, parallel ridges and grooves, typical of glacial fluting.

Much of the upland portions of the Chimacum basin were covered in diamicton sediment—sediment with particles ranging in size from sand to boulders. The compactness, sorting, and color of this sediment is highly variable. Landforms associated with stagnant glacial ice, such as hummocky terrain and kettles, are common in the region. Some of the highlands are lodgement till, deposits of unsorted glacial sediment which were lodged into the bedrock below during glacial movement. Glacial deposits can reach up to 900 ft (270 m) in some areas of the basin's uplands, overlying formations of sandstone and shale. Older portions of the western uplands contain material from the Eocene-era Crescent Formation and Lyre Formation, containing various sedimentary rocks alongside portions of volcanic tuff and breccia.

The floor of the valley consists of expanses of peat (especially along the East Fork) and alluvial deposits (sediment deposited by running water), alongside glacial outwash from both the advance and recession of the glaciers during the Vashon Stade. This glacial outwash material is highly permeable by water, allowing for high groundwater capacity and groundwater discharge into local rivers. The modern Chimacum Creek largely follows the channels created by glacial outwash during its recession. At the end of the Vashon Stade, the Puget Lobe of the ice sheet collapsed due to warming temperatures, and ocean water flooded much of the lowlands it previously covered. This deposited marine sediments over portions of the basin. About 12,500 years ago, glacial rebound allowed the local crust to rise again above sea level.

== Biology ==
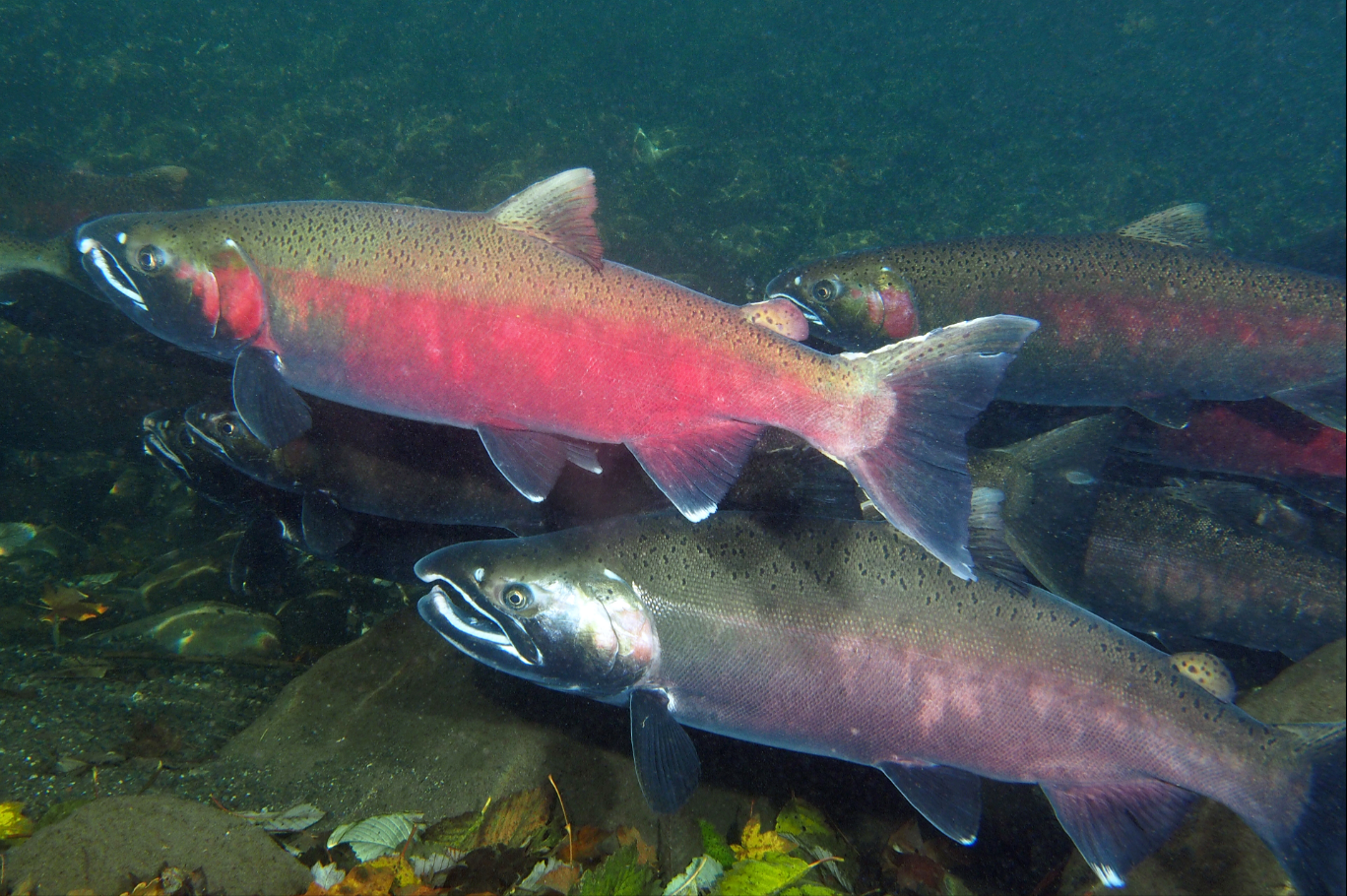
Coho salmon (pictured here in the Big Quilcene River) are among several species of salmonid who spawn in the creek.

Nine species of fish are attested in the Chimacum watershed. Many of these are salmonids who spawn in the creek, including coho and chum salmon, as well as steelhead trout and cutthroat trout. Stickleback, largemouth bass, western brook lamprey, and pumpkinseed inhabit the creek. Marine species such as starry flounder, surf smelt, pink salmon, and English sole use the estuary.

After its introduction to the Pacific Northwest as a forage crop in the 20th century, reed canarygrass has become a weed throughout the watershed, especially after livestock were barred access to the creek. Large patches of the plant cause flooding and lower stream flow rates, raising water temperatures. Forest restoration projects were carried out during the 1980s, planting cottonwood and willows along the banks of the creek to shade out the canarygrass. Beavers have created about 20 dams in the watershed since the 1990s, creating pools and resulting in flooding of farms and yards in some areas.

== History ==
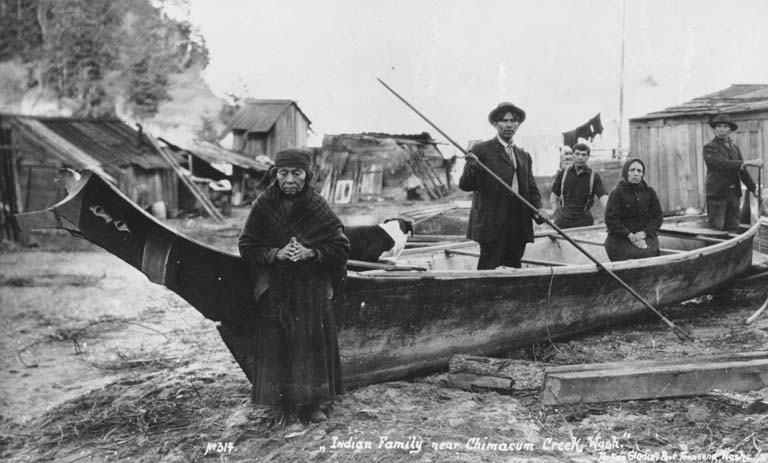
A Klallam family pose with a canoe near Chimacum Creek, 1914.

Prior to colonization, the lower reach of the creek and the Chimacum Valley was a network of forested swamps with many beaver ponds, meandering river channels, and crabapple shrubs. The riparian (riverside) areas of the watershed were covered by conifer forest, with trees such as spruce, cedar, hemlock, and fir. Some older sources mention patches of prairie in parts of the valley.

The Chimacum basin was traditionally inhabited by the eponymous Chemakum people, speakers of the Chemakum language, related to the Quileute language of the western Olympic Peninsula. By 1780, there were an estimated 400 members of the group, with many living in a village near the mouth of the creek. They used the name Gsqai to refer to both the village and the Chimacum Valley more generally. The name Chemakum derives from the name their surrounding Coast Salish neighbors (such as the Twana and Klallam) gave to them, rendered čə́bqəb in the Twana language. Prior to Euro-American settlement, epidemics and massacres by surrounding groups devastated the Chimacum, leading to the death of most of the population. Writing in 1855, ethnologist George Gibbs described the Chemakum as a "now almost extinct tribe" living in a village near Port Townsend. He wrote that many had lost their lives in attacks by the Makah and Snohomish nations many years prior, and that they were later subject to an attack by the Suquamish under the leadership of Chief Seattle around 1848.

=== After colonization ===
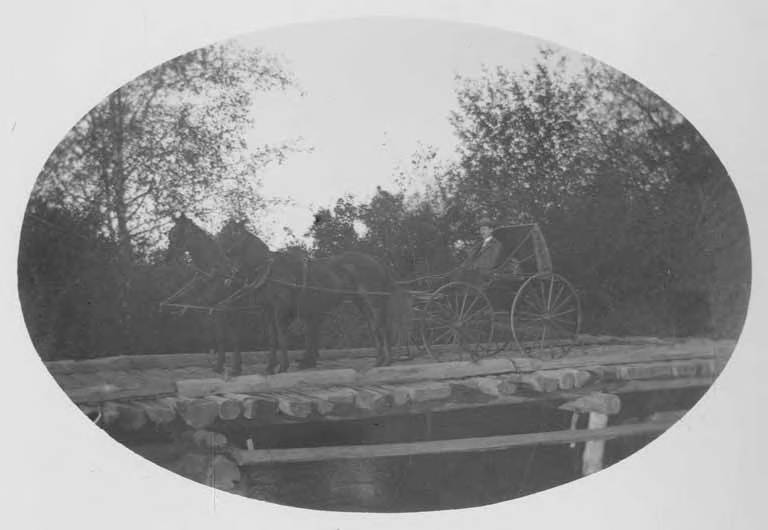
A man in a horse-drawn carriage passes over the creek on a log bridge, c. 1898.

Euro-American settlement in the area began during the 1850s. Port Townsend, on the head of the peninsula, was founded in 1851, while Port Hadlock was founded in 1870. Irondale was founded with the construction of an iron smeltery in 1879, and was platted as a town in 1909. The Irondale ironworks and adjacent industry deposited large amounts of fill material over the creek's estuary, resulting in the loss of the creek's lagoon and spit. A wooden truss bridge crossed the mouth of the creek. In 1909, the ironworks opened a steel foundry south of the creek, which soon produced over 700 tons of steel per day, employing around 600 workers. The plant closed in 1911, briefly reopening in 1917–1919 due to heavy demand for steel during World War I. The ironworks declined during the early 20th century, and the buildings adjacent to the creek were described as dilapidated in a 1915 report.

Until 1919, Chimacum Creek had not been subject to much modification, still meandering across the valley for much of its course. That year, a drainage district was formed, and a federally-subsidized drainage program channelized both the main and east forks of the stream across their valleys in order to prevent the flooding of adjacent agricultural land. Most farmers in the valley installed drainage tiles to quickly drain wetland areas. The lower portion of the creek became a popular recreation area in the 1930s, referred to under the name Irondale Creek, while the construction of roads and culverts blocked salmon access to many of the small tributary streams. During the early 1940s, additional drainage ditches were dug in the Chimacum Valley using gunpowder explosives, and the meander of the river was further reduced. The invasive reed canarygrass was introduced during the 1950s.

By 1955, a USDA report noted that the local government had failed to properly maintain the existing drainage infrastructure installed during the 1920s. The drainage district was inactive between 1968 and 1972, and significant floods broke out in the valley in 1970 and 1971. This led three residents to petition the county superior court to be appointed as the district's commissioners. The board oversaw ditch cleaning in the watershed, using personal funds, federal grants, and a small amount of remaining funds from before the district's inactivity. Two of the three commissioners resigned following public disclosure reforms in 1974, and the district again fell inactive. Dredging ceased in the watershed by this time.

Between 1970 and 1995, Chimacum High School operated a fish hatchery program, releasing juvenile salmon into the creek. In 1979, a hydrant leaked over 100,000 gallons (378,500 liters) of heavily chlorinated water into the creek, killing most of the 42,350 juvenile coho salmon which had been released into the creek immediately prior. The summer run of chum salmon ceased to use the creek by the mid-1980s. A culvert failure and storms in the winter of 1982–1983 deposited fine sediment throughout the lower river in Irondale and cemented a portion of the spawning gravel together, lowering the rates of reproduction. A year later, storms created a landslide on the upper mainstem, releasing sediment onto spawning gravel and prompting regular cleanup efforts,

Efforts to restore riparian forest conditions began in the 1980s and 1990s. Driven from the area by forest clearing and trapping during the late 19th and early 20th centuries, beavers were reintroduced to the watershed in the 1960s, and became prevalent as riparian forests spread along the creek. A hatchery program reintroduced summer chum salmon in the late 1990s and early 2000s using stock from nearby Salmon Creek. Habitat restoration in 2006 cleared most of the infill from the creek's delta.

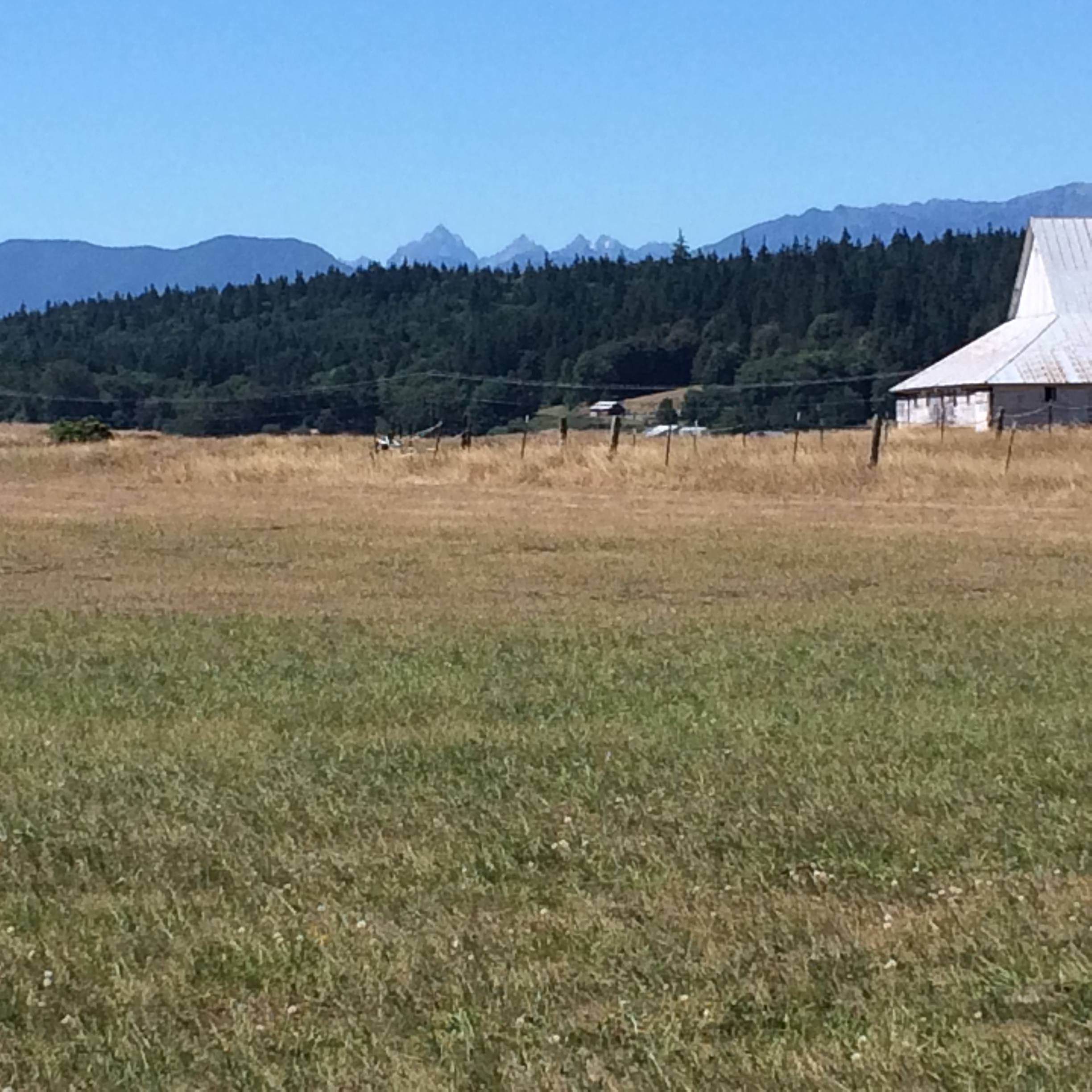
View of the Olympic Mountains from the Chimacum Valley

=== Modern land use and management ===
The creek's lower basin is mainly zoned as residential area in the communities of Chimacum, Port Hadlock, and Irondale (collectively referred to as the "Tri-Area"), the densest population center in the watershed. Residential zones in the uplands flank the valley, while a mix of private and publicly-owned forestlands cover much of the upper portion of the watershed. The Chimacum Valley is used for commercial agriculture, and is among the largest agricultural areas in Jefferson County, with about 3,000 acres (1,200 ha) of farmland in the watershed. Livestock farming once prevalent, has declined since the 2000s, with smaller farms switching production to vegetables, blueberries, and small grains. The last dairy in the valley closed in 2016. Remaining livestock areas are largely fenced off from the creek, although some livestock contact still occurs.

From the 2000s to the 2020s, large environmental restoration programs were implemented across the creek. By the early 2000s, much of the land surrounding the last mile of the river's course was in public ownership or managed by community-owned easements such as the Jefferson Land Trust. Much of the land in this area was purchased by the United States Fish and Wildlife Service and the Washington Recreation and Conservation Office over the following decade to form the Chimacum Wildlife Area Unit, a 130-acre (53 ha) protected area managed by the Washington Department of Fish and Wildlife as part of the North Olympic Wildlife Area.

== Notes ==
=== Cited sources ===
- Bahls, Peter; Rubin, Judith (1996). Chimacum Watershed Coho Salmon Restoration Assessment (PDF) (Report). Port Gamble S'Klallam Tribe.
- Collins, June M. (1949). "Distribution of the Chemakum Language". In Smith, Marian W. (ed.). Indians of the Urban Northwest. Columbia University Press. doi:10.7312/smit91566. Republished: ISBN 978-0-231-88436-5
- Correa, Ginna (2002). Salmon and Steelhead Limiting Factors: Water Resource Area 17, Quilcene-Snow Basin (PDF) (Report). Washington State Conservation Commission.
- ESA Adolfson (2008). Jefferson County Shoreline Master Program Update Project: Final Shoreline Inventory and Characterization Report, Revised (PDF) (Report). Jefferson County Department of Community Development. Archived (PDF) from the original on August 3, 2025.
- GeoEngineers (2015). Cleanup Action and Site Restoration Completion Report: Irondale Iron and Steel Plant, Irondale, Washington (PDF) (Report). Washington State Department of Ecology.
- Chimacum Drainage District: History, Current Conditions, and Potential Options for the Future (PDF) (Report). Jefferson County Conservation District. 2022.
- Chimacum Drainage District Analysis (PDF) (Report). Jefferson County Conservation District. 2024.
- Gatley, Glenn; Clarke, Jerry; Ecelberger, Dana; Schrader, Craig (2015). Chimacum Watershed Water Quality and Fishes: A Comprehensive Review (PDF) (Report). Washington State Conservation Commission. Archived (PDF) from the original on May 13, 2024.
- Johnson, Thom H.; Weller, Chris (2003). Ongoing Supplementation Programs for Summer Chum Salmon in the Hood Canal and Strait of Juan de Fuca Regions of Washington State (PDF) (Report). Washington Department of Fish and Wildlife.
- Jones, Joseph L.; Welch, Wendy B.; Frans, Lonna M.; Olsen, Theresa D. (2011). "Hydrogeologic Framework, Groundwater Movement, and Water Budget in the Chimacum Creek Basin and Vicinity, Jefferson County, Washington" (PDF). Scientific Investigations Report (Report). United States Geological Survey. doi:10.3133/sir20115129.
- Jones, Joseph L.; Johnson, Kenneth H.; Frans, Lonna M. (2013). "Numerical Simulation of the Groundwater-Flow System in Chimacum Creek Basin and Vicinity, Jefferson County, Washington". Scientific Investigations Report (Report). United States Geological Survey. doi:10.3133/sir20135160.
- Polenz, Michael; Gordon, Harvey O.; Hubert, Ian J.; Contreras, Trevor A.; Patton, Annette I.; Paulín, Gabriel Legorreta; Cakir, Recep (2014). Geologic Map of the Center 7.5-Minute Quadrangle, Jefferson County, Washington (Report). Washington State Department of Natural Resources.
- Schasse, Henry W.; Slaughter, Stephen L. (2005). Geologic Map of the Port Townsend South and Part of the Port Townsend North 7.5-minute Quadrangles, Jefferson County, Washington (PDF) (Report). Washington State Department of Natural Resources. Archived (PDF) from the original on August 19, 2025.
- Simonds, F. William; Longpré, Claire I.; Justin, Greg B. (2004). Ground-Water System in the Chimacum Creek Basin and Surface Water/Ground Water Interaction in Chimacum and Tarboo Creeks and the Big and Little Quilcene Rivers, Eastern Jefferson County, Washington (PDF) (Report). United States Geological Survey. Archived (PDF) from the original on March 8, 2026.
- Todd, Steve; Fitzpatrick, Nick; Carter-Mortimer, Alan; Weller, Chris (2006). Historical Changes to Estuaries, Spits, and Associated Tidal Wetland Habitats in the Hood Canal and Strait of Juan de Fuca Regions of Washington State: Appendix B, Port Townsned/Oak Bay Sub-Region (Report). Point No Point Treaty Council.
- Williams, R. Walter; Phinney, Lloyd A. (1975). "17: Quilcene Basin". A Catalog of Washington Streams and Salmon Utilization (PDF) (Report). Vol. 2. Washington Department of Fisheries.
