= Mystery Bay State Park =

State park in Washington, United States

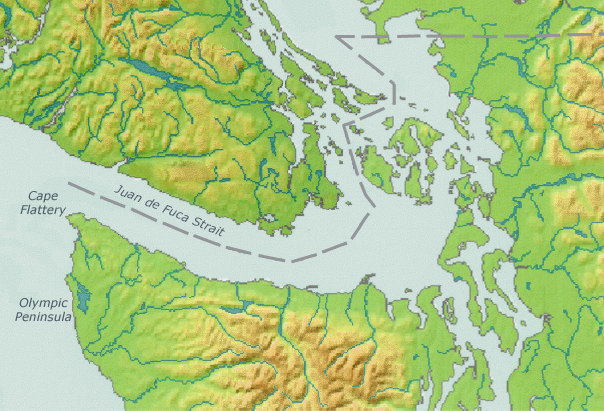
- Location within Strait of Juan de Fuca Location within Washington (state) Location within the United States
- Location: Jefferson County, Washington, United States
- Coordinates: 48°03′23″N 122°41′43″W
- Area: 18 acres (7.3 ha)
- Elevation: 16 ft (4.9 m)
- Established: 1972
- Administrator: Washington State Parks and Recreation Commission
- Website: Official website

Mystery Bay State Park is an eighteen-acre (7.3 ha) Washington marine state park on Mystery Bay, a small inlet off Scow Bay/Kilisut Harbor on the western side of Marrowstone Island. The park is located approximately one-half mile north of the Nordland General Store (which also faces Mystery Bay) on Flagler Road (SR 116). Many older wooden sailboats can be swinging at permanent moorage at the park. Park activities include picnicking, shellfish harvesting, fishing, boating, beachcombing, and scuba diving.
