= Jefferson County International Airport =

Airport in Washington, United States

Jefferson County International Airport Port Townsend Army Airfield
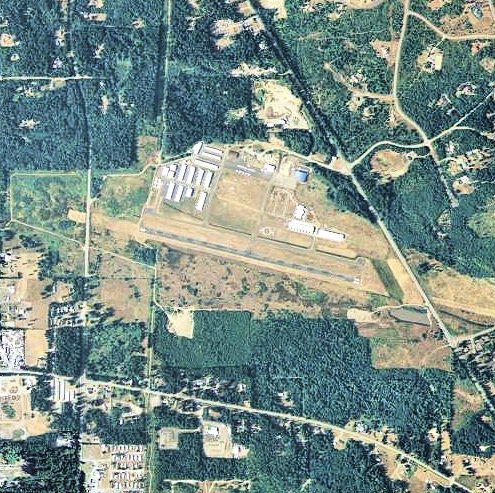
- 2006 USGS Orthophoto
- IATA: TWD; ICAO: none; FAA LID: 0S9

Summary
- Airport type: Public
- Owner: Port of Port Townsend
- Serves: Port Townsend, Washington
- Elevation AMSL: 110 ft (34 m)
- Coordinates: 48°03′14″N 122°48′38″W
- Website: http://portofpt.com/air-services/jefferson-county-international-airport/

Map
- Location of Jefferson County International Airport TWD (the United States)

Runways
Direction	Length		Surface
Direction	ft	m	Surface
9/27	3,000	914	Asphalt

Statistics (2019)
- Aircraft operations: 58,100
- Based aircraft: 53
- Source: Federal Aviation Administration

Jefferson County International Airport (IATA: TWD, FAA LID: 0S9) is a public-use airport located four nautical miles (7 km) southwest of the central business district of Port Townsend, a town in Jefferson County, Washington, United States. It is owned by the Port of Port Townsend.

== Facilities and aircraft ==
Jefferson County International Airport covers an area of 320 acres (130 ha) at an elevation of 110 feet (34 m) above mean sea level. It has one runway designated 9/27 with an asphalt surface measuring 3,000 by 75 feet (914 x 23 m).

For the 12-month period ending December 31, 2019, the airport had 58,100 aircraft operations, an average of 159 per day: 97% general aviation, 3% air taxi, and <1% military. At that time there were 53 aircraft based at this airport: 49 single-engine, 2 multi-engine and 2 glider.

Emergency services to the airport are provided by East Jefferson Fire and Rescue’s Station 1-3, located adjacent of the airport.

There is no tower at the airfield, and the runway is not regularly lit at night.

The Port Townsend Aero Museum is located on the grounds of the airport, with several aircraft and artifacts on display. The museum is open to the public.

== See also ==
- List of airports in Washington
