= Port Ludlow, Washington =

- Census-designated place
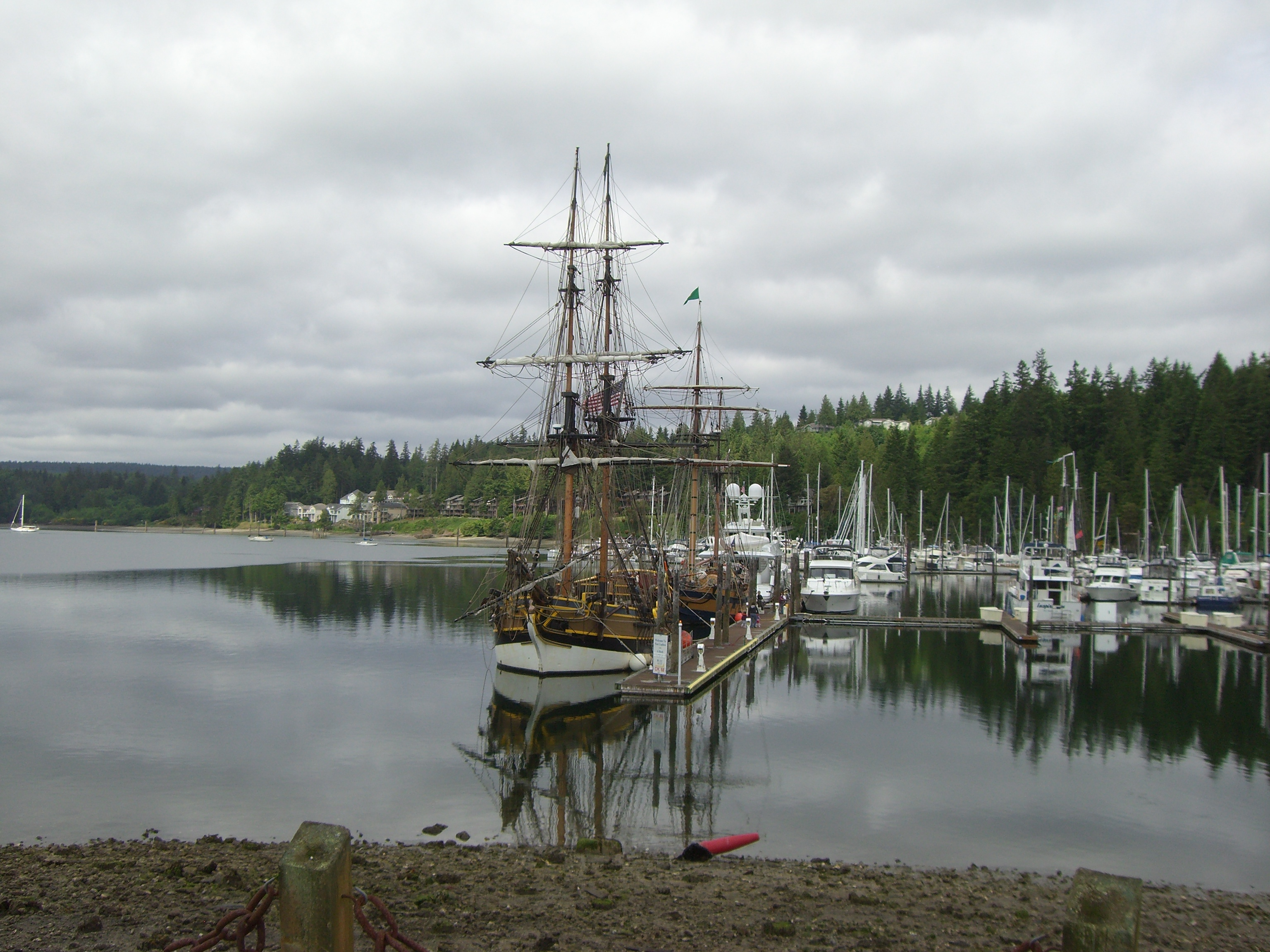
- Port Ludlow marina

- Location of Port Ludlow, Washington
- Coordinates: 47°53′36″N 122°41′26″W
- Country: United States
- State: Washington
- County: Jefferson

Area
  - Total: 14.1 sq mi (36.6 km^{2})
  - Land: 11.5 sq mi (29.9 km^{2})
  - Water: 2.6 sq mi (6.7 km^{2})
- Elevation: 72 ft (22 m)

Population (2021)
  - Total: 3,046
  - Density: 264.2/sq mi (102.0/km^{2})
- Time zone: UTC-8 (Pacific (PST))
  - Summer (DST): UTC-7 (PDT)
- ZIP Code: 98365
- Area code(s): 360, 564
- FIPS code: 53-55645
- GNIS feature ID: 2409093

Port Ludlow is an unincorporated community and census-designated place (CDP) in Jefferson County, Washington, United States. It is also the name of the marine inlet on which the community is located. As of the 2020 census, Port Ludlow had a population of 2,959.

Originally a logging and sawmill community, its economy declined during the first half of the 20th century. Following the completion of the nearby Hood Canal Bridge in 1960, Port Ludlow became the site of resorts and planned communities, attracting more affluent residents who were retired, buying vacation homes, or needing a more convenient commute to the business centers on the west side of Puget Sound. Based on per capita income, Port Ludlow ranks 16th of 522 ranked areas in the state of Washington, and achieves the highest rank in Jefferson County. Port Ludlow's location and marina facilities make it a convenient and popular port for leisure craft sailing between Puget Sound and the San Juan Islands.

== History ==
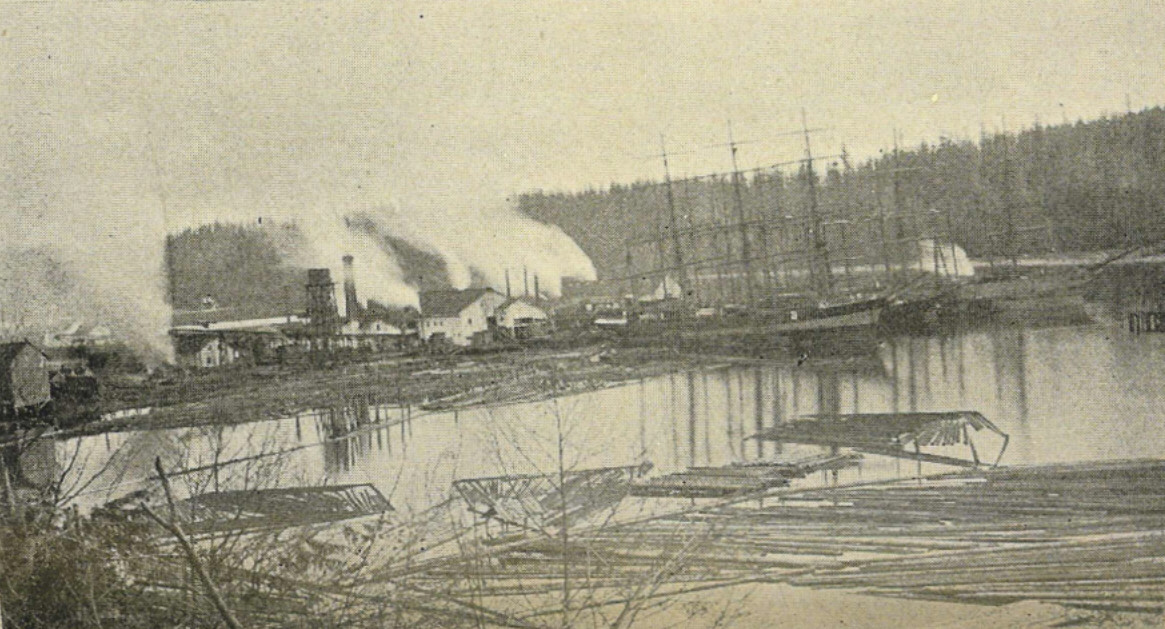
Sawmill at Port Ludlow, 1900. Tall ships are docked to load timber.

The United States Exploring Expedition, under Charles Wilkes, entered Puget Sound in 1841. Wilkes bestowed many patriotically American place names; at the time the sovereignty of the Oregon Country was yet to be resolved between Britain and the United States. Many of Wilkes's names commemorated American heroes and victories during the War of 1812. Port Ludlow was one of these, honoring Augustus Ludlow, a War of 1812 American naval hero.

Early explorers of the Pacific Northwest often named sheltered inlets with names beginning with "Port". Communities that subsequently developed often adopted their inlet's name. Today Port Ludlow is both the name of the inlet and the community on its shore. To avoid confusion the inlet is sometimes called Port Ludlow Bay.

The first shipments of timber from the Puget Sound to San Francisco in 1851 stimulated interest in the business potential of building sawmills on Puget Sound. John R. Thorndike and W. P. Sayward sailed to Puget Sound in 1852 and found the environs of Port Ludlow promising. Thorndike filed a timber claim of 318 acres (1.29 km^{2}), and they started building a mill there. The initial mill housed two sash saws capable of producing 3,000 feet (910 m) of lumber daily. The trees along the banks of the bay were logged first, and then oxen and horses were used to bring more distant logs to the mill. The mill was leased in 1858 to the Amos & Phinney Company, of which A. Phinney became the resident manager.

The U.S. Federal Census of 1860 designated Port Ludlow as one of the three enumeration districts in Jefferson County, Washington Territory. The census tally portrays the make-up of a young logging and sawmill community: Of the 124 people counted, 117 (94%) were adults between the ages of 20 and 50, and the remaining 7 were children. Of the adult population 112 (96%) were men and only 5 women, of which 3 were residing with husbands. 53 (47%) of the men were listed as lumbermen and 14 (13%) as sawyers. Of the total population, 94 (76%) were born in the United States, and of those all were born in the eastern half of the nation but two — a two-year-old born in California and a one-year-old born in Washington Territory. Of the 30 (24%) who were foreign-born, 8 were born in England, 8 in Ireland, 6 in Canada, 4 in Germany, 2 in Norway, and one each in Australia and Denmark. The indigenous peoples were not counted in the 1860 census.

== Geography ==
Port Ludlow, the community, is located on the eastern edge of Jefferson County on the northwest side of Port Ludlow, the waterbody. The original settlement of Port Ludlow is in the northern part of the CDP, with new development reaching south of the Port Ludlow inlet. The CDP also includes the communities of Mats Mats (to the north), Swansonville (to the northwest), and Beaver Valley (on the western edge). Washington State Route 19 forms the western edge of the CDP, leading north 8 miles (13 km) to Port Hadlock and having its southern terminus at Washington State Route 104 at the southwest corner of the Port Ludlow CDP. SR 104 forms the southern edge of the CDP and leads east 8 miles (13 km) across Hood Canal to Port Gamble and west the same distance to U.S. Route 101.

According to the United States Census Bureau, the Port Ludlow CDP has a total area of 14.1 square miles (36.6 km^{2}), of which 2.6 square miles (6.7 km^{2}), or 18.28%, are water.

== Demographics ==
Historical population
| Census | Pop. | Note | %± |
|---|---|---|---|
| 2000 | 1,968 | | — |
| 2010 | 2,603 | | 32.3% |
| 2020 | 2,959 | | 13.7% |
U.S. Decennial Census; 1990 2000 2010 2020

Port Ludlow first appeared as a census designated place in the 2000 U.S. census.

=== Racial and ethnic composition ===
Port Ludlow CDP, Washington – Racial and ethnic composition Note: the US Census treats Hispanic/Latino as an ethnic category. This table excludes Latinos from the racial categories and assigns them to a separate category. Hispanics/Latinos may be of any race.
| Race / Ethnicity (NH = Non-Hispanic) | Pop 2000 | Pop 2010 | Pop 2020 | % 2000 | % 2010 | % 2020 |
|---|---|---|---|---|---|---|
| White alone (NH) | 1,878 | 2,439 | 2,631 | 95.43% | 93.70% | 88.92% |
| Black or African American alone (NH) | 2 | 8 | 11 | 0.10% | 0.31% | 0.37% |
| Native American or Alaska Native alone (NH) | 4 | 21 | 10 | 0.20% | 0.81% | 0.34% |
| Asian alone (NH) | 28 | 34 | 66 | 1.42% | 1.31% | 2.23% |
| Native Hawaiian or Pacific Islander alone (NH) | 3 | 0 | 6 | 0.15% | 0.00% | 0.20% |
| Other race alone (NH) | 6 | 9 | 11 | 0.30% | 0.35% | 0.37% |
| Mixed race or Multiracial (NH) | 17 | 40 | 127 | 0.86% | 1.54% | 4.29% |
| Hispanic or Latino (any race) | 30 | 52 | 97 | 1.52% | 2.00% | 3.28% |
| Total | 1,968 | 2,603 | 2,959 | 100.00% | 100.00% | 100.00% |

=== 2000 census ===
As of the census of 2000, there were 1,968 people, 954 households, and 742 families residing in the CDP. The population density was 172.2 people per square mile (66.5/km^{2}). There were 1,186 housing units at an average density of 103.8/sq mi (40.1/km^{2}). The racial makeup of the CDP was 96.39% White, 0.10% African American, 0.20% Native American, 1.42% Asian, 0.15% Pacific Islander, 0.76% from other races, and 0.97% from two or more races. Hispanic or Latino of any race were 1.52% of the population.

There were 954 households, out of which 10.4% had children under the age of 18 living with them, 74.2% were married couples living together, 2.4% had a female householder with no husband present, and 22.2% were non-families. 18.0% of all households were made up of individuals, and 10.5% had someone living alone who was 65 years of age or older. The average household size was 2.06 and the average family size was 2.29.

In the CDP, the population was spread out, with 9.5% under the age of 18, 2.0% from 18 to 24, 11.9% from 25 to 44, 36.2% from 45 to 64, and 40.3% who were 65 years of age or older. The median age was 61 years. For every 100 females, there were 94.9 males. For every 100 females age 18 and over, there were 96.0 males.

The median income for a household in the CDP was $56,938, and the median income for a family was $62,298. Males had a median income of $50,265 versus $24,531 for females. The per capita income for the CDP was $36,625. None of the families and 1.2% of the population were living below the poverty line, including no under eighteens and none of those over 64.
