= Scugog carrying place =

The Scugog carrying place was the southern end of a route connecting Lake Ontario and Lake Scugog, in what is now Oshawa, Ontario. According to the Oshawa Museum travellers followed the route up Oshawa Creek to where it forked with Harmony Creek, with one branch leading to Lake Scugog and the other to Lake Simcoe.

== See also ==
- Toronto Carrying-Place Trail
