= Port Hadlock-Irondale, Washington =

- Census-designated place
- Location of Port Hadlock-Irondale, Washington
- Coordinates: 48°01′56″N 122°45′50″W
- Country: United States
- State: Washington
- County: Jefferson

Area
  - Total: 7.8 sq mi (20.1 km^{2})
  - Land: 6.7 sq mi (17.3 km^{2})
  - Water: 1.1 sq mi (2.8 km^{2})
- Elevation: 125 ft (38 m)

Population (2020)
  - Total: 3,983
  - Density: 535/sq mi (206.7/km^{2})
- Time zone: UTC-8 (Pacific (PST))
  - Summer (DST): UTC-7 (PDT)
- ZIP Code: 98339
- Area code(s): 360, 564
- FIPS code: 53-55620
- GNIS feature ID: 2409092

Port Hadlock-Irondale is a census-designated place (CDP) in Jefferson County, Washington, United States. The population was 3,983 at the 2020 census.

== History of Irondale ==
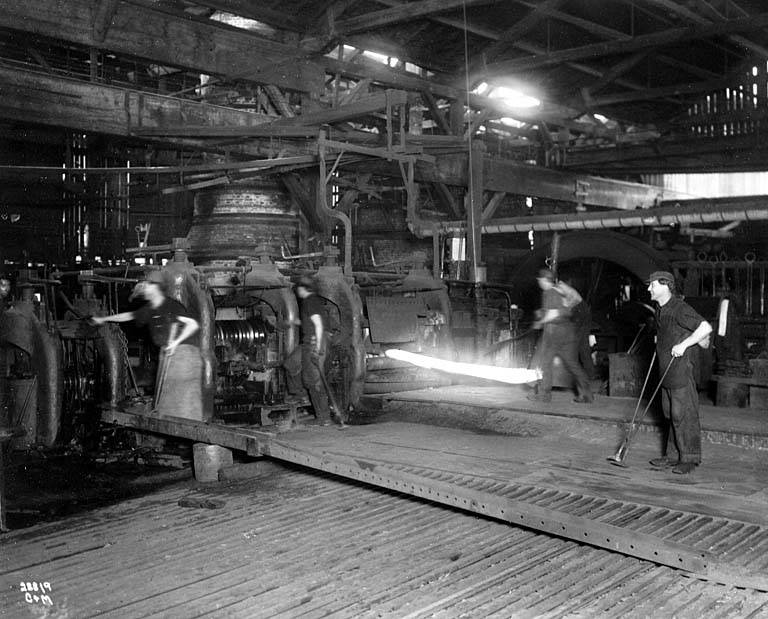
Rolling bars in Irondale

The first iron-producing blast furnace in Washington Territory was completed in Irondale in 1881. About 1,200 tons of pig iron was produced during its first year of operation, with ore obtained from Chimacum Valley. The plant was closed in 1889.

The initial hope was for Irondale to become a major iron and steel producer for the western United States. At first, it looked as though this dream was going to come true. After only two years of production, Irondale had several bars, boarding facilities for both men and horses, and homes and accommodations for over 200 workers. Before the local economy and the plant failed in 1889, there were over 400 men employed at the foundry. The town expanded and grew on the sandy bluffs that overlooked the waterside plant.

There were several efforts made to rebuild the iron and steel plant in the following years, but all failed. Irondale today is a bedroom community for the surrounding towns of Port Hadlock, Port Townsend and further south to Silverdale.

== History of Port Hadlock ==
Samuel Hadlock, the founder of Port Hadlock, moved west in 1846, finally landing in the Port Hadlock area in 1870. He contracted with the Washington Mill Company to build a sawmill on a spit of land at the south end of Port Townsend Bay, on a low bank, but deep enough waters for tall ships to moor. Hadlock established a large lumber mill. Lumber from the mill was shipped to San Francisco, and as far away as Australia and Hawaii. Two of the remaining buildings of the Washington Mill Company are what is known today as the Northwest School of Wooden Boat Building, and the residence of Samuel Hadlock, presently known as the Ajax Cafe.

On the waterfront near the mill were a general store, post office, barber shop, livery stable, laundry, two hotels and two saloons. The saloons were frequented by sailors from all over the world as well as local mill workers, longshoremen, and loggers. There was little law enforcement and it was life in the Wild West.

In 1909 construction started on the alcohol plant. It was completed in 1910, when it began manufacturing wood alcohol from sawdust. The operational costs of this venture proved too costly, and the plant suspended operation about 1913. The alcohol plant was renovated into a resort, which included an inn, restaurant, marina and art gallery. The resort and restaurant are open to the public.

The residential section was in upper Hadlock. After the lumber mill burned, businesses began to move uptown. William Sehrs of Sehrs Shipyard built the Masonic Temple in 1911. Sehrs completed other projects such as the Nordland ferry and bridges across Chimacum Creek. The Tri-Area was a growing, viable community.

Subsequent industries have included a boat building yard and a clam cannery. In 1946 Melvin Kivley established the first businesses at the Hadlock intersection - a secondhand store and a Signal Service Station.

== Geography ==
Port Hadlock-Irondale is located in northeastern Jefferson County on the Quimper Peninsula, an arm of the northeast corner of the Olympic Peninsula. The CDP includes the communities of Port Hadlock and Irondale, plus part of Chimacum, all of which form what is locally known as the "tri-area". Irondale is in the northeast corner of the CDP, and Port Hadlock is adjacent to it in the east part of the CDP; both communities abut Port Townsend Bay. Chimacum is on the southern edge of the CDP, in the Chimacum Valley at the intersection of Washington State Route 19 and Chimacum Road. The CDP extends to the west to within 0.5 miles (0.8 km) of Discovery Bay.

The community is 8 miles (13 km) south of Port Townsend and 18 miles (29 km) north of Port Gamble. According to the United States Census Bureau, the CDP has a total area of 7.8 square miles (20.1 km^{2}), of which 6.7 square miles (17.3 km^{2}) are land and 1.1 square miles (2.8 km^{2}), or 13.77%, are water.

== Demographics ==
Historical population
Census	Pop.	Note	%±
1980	1,752		—
1990	2,742		56.5%
2000	3,476		26.8%
2010	3,580		3.0%
2020	3,983		11.3%
U.S. Decennial Census; 1970 1980 1990; 2000 2010 2020

As of the census of 2000, there were 3,476 people, 1,407 households, and 955 families residing in the CDP. The population density was 521.3 people per square mile (201.2/km^{2}). There were 1,537 housing units at an average density of 230.5/sq mi (89.0/km^{2}). The racial makeup of the CDP was 90.7% White, 0.3% African American, 1.9% Native American, 1.4% Asian, 0.1% Pacific Islander, 0.6% from other races, and 5.0% from two or more races. Hispanic or Latino of any race were 2.5% of the population.

There were 1,407 households, out of which 34.6% had children under the age of 18 living with them, 51.6% were married couples living together, 11.4% had a female householder with no husband present, and 32.1% were non-families. 25.8% of all households were made up of individuals, and 9.1% had someone living alone who was 65 years of age or older. The average household size was 2.47 and the average family size was 2.96.

In the CDP, the population was spread out, with 27.2% under the age of 18, 7.3% from 18 to 24, 27.7% from 25 to 44, 24.2% from 45 to 64, and 13.7% who were 65 years of age or older. The median age was 38 years. For every 100 females, there were 97.7 males. For every 100 females age 18 and over, there were 99.5 males.

The median income for a household in the CDP was $32,202, and the median income for a family was $34,847. Males had a median income of $34,583 versus $22,500 for females. The per capita income for the CDP was $15,721. About 13.6% of families and 14.4% of the population were below the poverty line, including 20.5% of those under age 18 and 8.2% of those age 65 or over.
