= Indian Island, Washington =

Unincorporated community in Washington, United States

- Unincorporated community
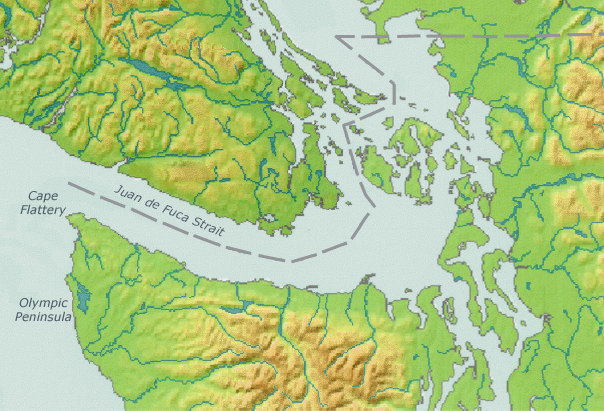
- Location within Strait of Juan de Fuca Location within Washington (state) Location within the United States
- Coordinates: 48°03′07″N 122°43′27″W
- Country: United States
- State: Washington
- County: Jefferson
- Time zone: UTC-8 (Pacific (PST))
  - Summer (DST): UTC-7 (PDT)
- Area code(s): 360, 564

Indian Island is an unincorporated community in Jefferson County, Washington, United States. The whole island is covered by the Marrowstone CDP. It is located between Port Townsend Bay and Kilisut Harbor. Parts also border on Oak Bay and Scow Bay.

Until the construction of the Port Townsend Ship Canal (also known as Portage Canal) Indian Island was connected to the mainland by a broad sand flat and backshore marsh. Indian Island is the location of the Indian Island Naval Reserve, which covers the entire island. No civilian residences are allowed on Indian Island. Indian Island is attached to Marrowstone Island, and is often grouped with it. Indian Island is served by the ZIP code for Nordland. The entire island has a land area of 11.28 km^{2} (4.3553 sq mi) and a population of 44 persons as of the 2000 census.

== Naval Magazine ==
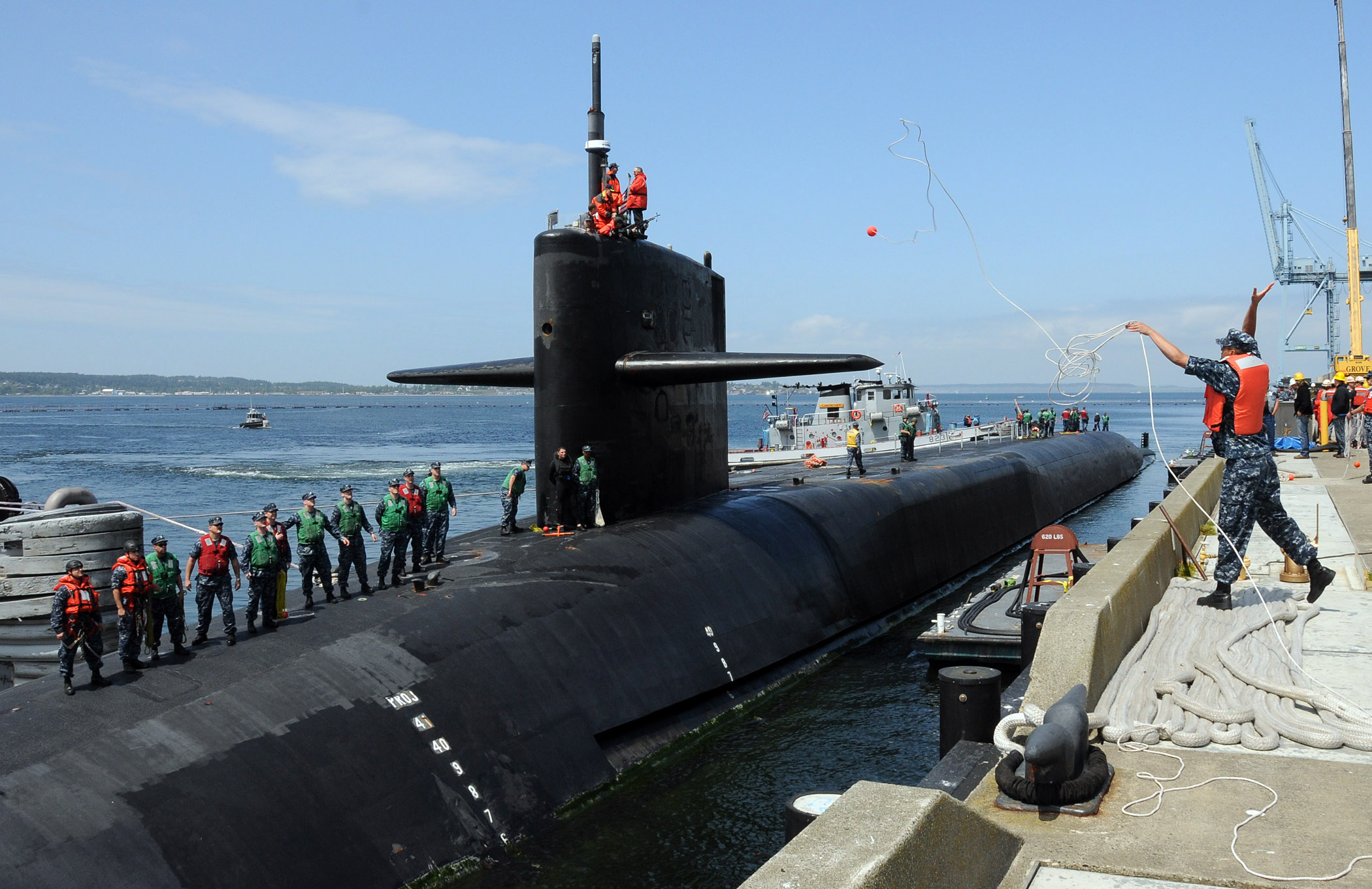
USS Michigan at the Naval Magazine

Indian Island is a major U.S. Navy munitions handling facility. Navy combat ships and Military Sealift Command vessels frequent Indian Island's dock receiving and discharging munitions in support of U.S. military operations worldwide. The Navy also services refitted Ohio class missile submarines (formerly SSBN, now SSGN) at Indian Island. Environmental and peace activists have raised questions about Navy activities at Indian Island.
