= Marrowstone, Washington =

- CDP
- Location of Marrowstone, Washington
- Coordinates: 48°3′30″N 122°41′17″W
- Country: United States
- State: Washington
- County: Jefferson

Area
  - Total: 6.3 sq mi (16.4 km^{2})
  - Land: 6.3 sq mi (16.4 km^{2})
  - Water: 0 sq mi (0.0 km^{2})
- Elevation: 16 ft (5 m)

Population (2010)
  - Total: 844
  - Density: 132/sq mi (51.1/km^{2})
- Time zone: UTC-8 (Pacific (PST))
  - Summer (DST): UTC-7 (PDT)
- FIPS code: 53-43762
- GNIS feature ID: 1852949

Marrowstone is a census-designated place (CDP) in Jefferson County, Washington, United States. As of the 2020 census, Marrowstone had a population of 995. All Marrowstone addresses are in Nordland, Washington, and the ZIP code for Marrowstone Island is 98358.

Marrowstone takes its name from Marrowstone Point, the northernmost point on Marrowstone Island. It was given the name "Marrow-Stone Point" in 1792 by the British explorer, George Vancouver, in describing the area's hard, clay-like soil.

== History ==
A post office called Nordland has been in operation since 1898. The community derives its name from Peter Nordby, the original owner of the town site.

== Geography ==
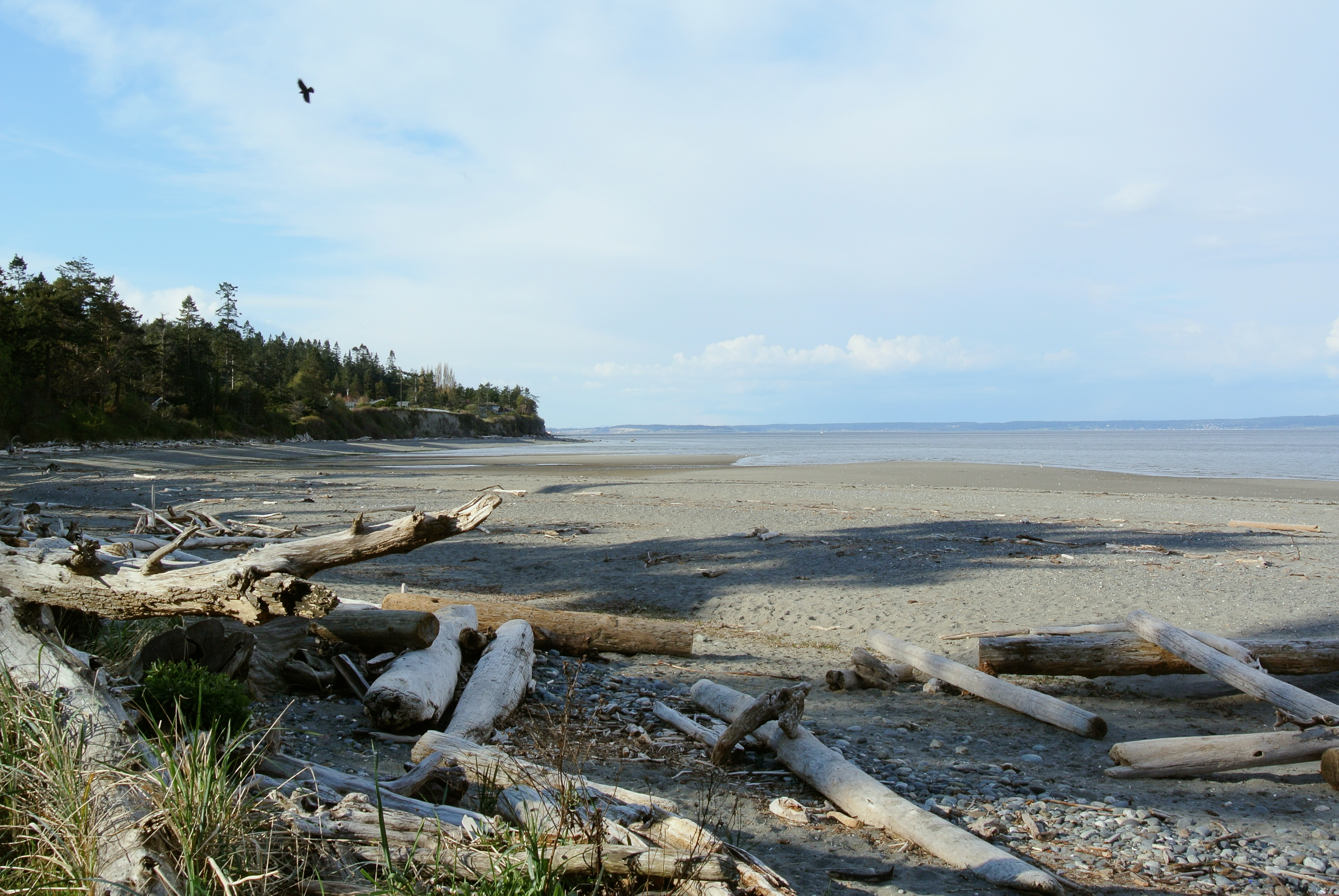
East Beach Park, looking north towards Marrowstone Point

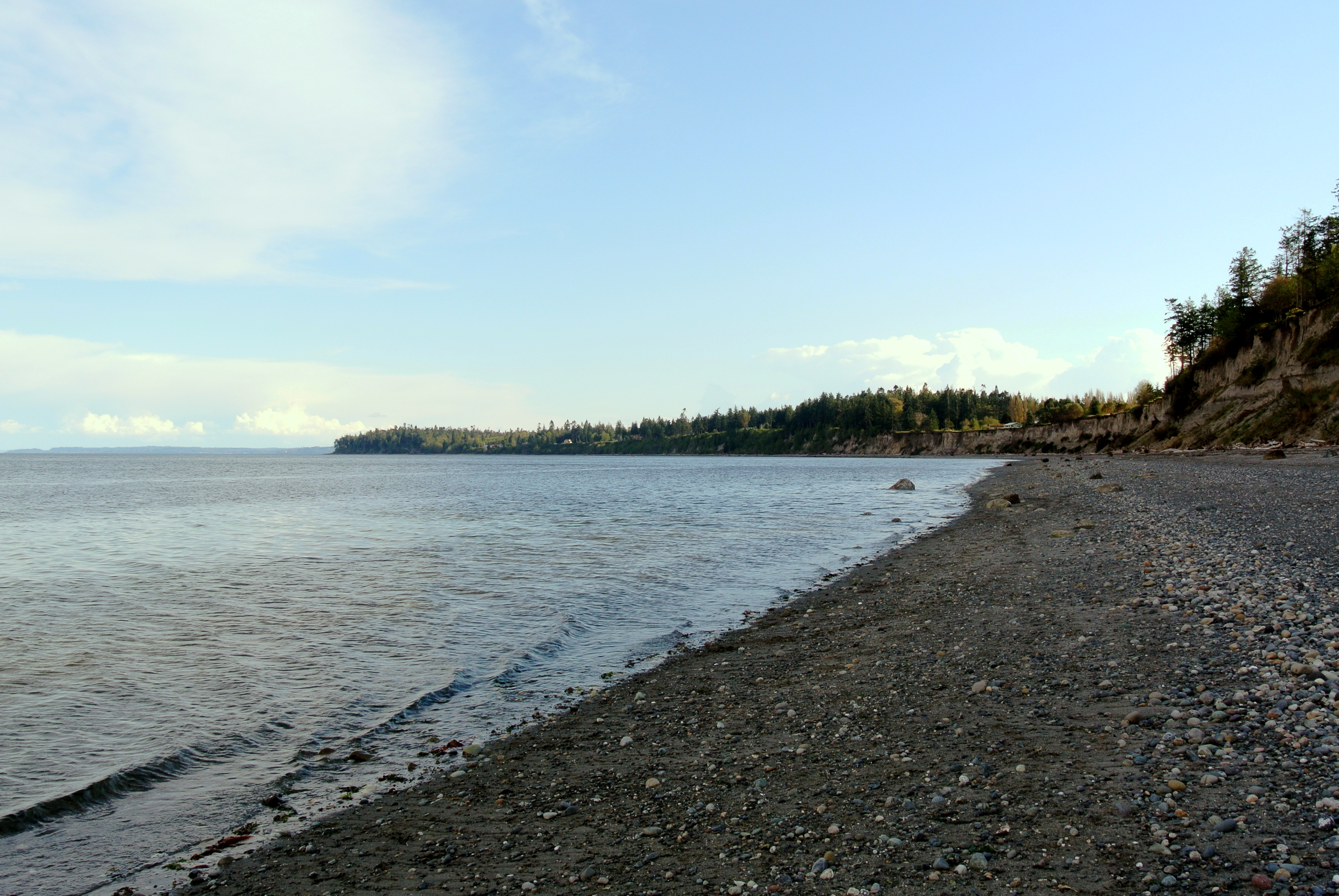
Northern side of Nodule Point

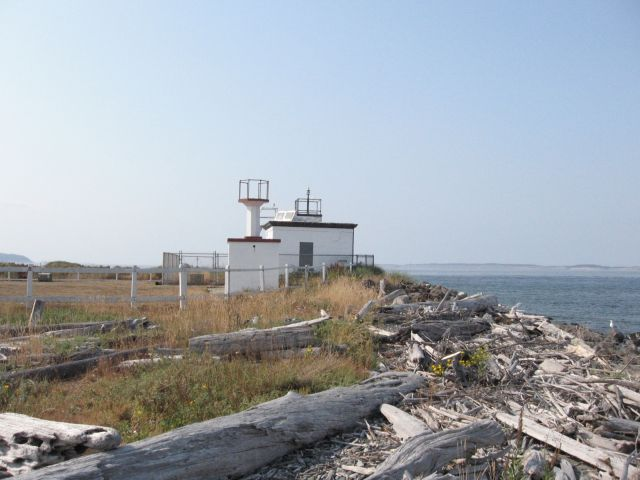
Marrowstone Point Light

Marrowstone is located at 48°3′30″N 122°41′17″W (48.058323, -122.687943).

According to the United States Census Bureau, the CDP has a total area of 6.3 square miles (16.4 km^{2}), all of it land.

Prominent land features include:

- Marrowstone Point, at the northern end of Marrowstone Island;
- Kinney Point, at the southern end of the island;
- Nodule Point, on the east side, mid island;
- Mystery Bay, an inlet on the western side of Marrowstone Island;
- Griffiths Point, on the western side of Mystery Bay;
- East Beach, a sandy beach at the northern end of East Marrowstone Road; and
- Scow Bay/Kilisut Harbor, which separates Marrowstone Island from its western neighbor, Indian Island, a Navy ammunition depot.
- the narrow causeway which used to connect the southwestern end of Marrowstone Island with the southern end of Indian Island was removed and replaced by a low bridge in 2022-2023. This was done to create passage for salmon into Scow Bay and beyond. Opening the cut restored the passage that used to exist. A short, higher bridge joins the western side of Indian Island to the mainland of Jefferson County.

Fort Flagler, a Washington state park, is situated on 784 acres (314 hectares) at the northern end of Marrowstone Island. It overlooks Port Townsend Bay and Admiralty Inlet, the entrance to Puget Sound. Fort Flagler was one of three forts, along with Fort Worden (near Port Townsend) and Fort Casey (on Whidbey Island), that guarded the entrance to Puget Sound. Mystery Bay State Park is another state park on Marrowstone Island, located on 10 acres (4 hectares) of Mystery Bay shorefront about a half-mile north of the Nordland General Store. It is primarily for boaters. Kinney Point State Park comprises 76 acres (310,000 m^{2}) at the south end of the island. Accessible only by boat, it is part of the Cascadia Marine Trail.

Flagler Road (SR 116) runs along the western edge of Marrowstone Island, which is primarily low-lying. East Marrowstone Road runs along the eastern edge of the island, which consists largely of sandy bluffs, with the exception of the area near East Beach.

The Nordland General Store is Marrowstone's only source of groceries. It is arguably the focal point of Marrowstone; on maps the town of Nordland (the address of all Marrowstone residents) is usually located at the site of the Nordland General Store. It can be found just across Flagler Road from Mystery Bay, near the center of Marrowstone Island. Severely damaged by fire in November of 2020, it was forced to close for an extended period before re-opening in 2024 as a community-owned co-op.

== Demographics ==
Historical population
| Census | Pop. | Note | %± |
|---|---|---|---|
| 2000 | 837 | | — |
| 2010 | 844 | | 0.8% |
| 2020 | 995 | | 17.9% |
U.S. Decennial Census; 1990 2000 2010

Marrowstone first appeared as a census designated place in the 2000 U.S. census.

=== Racial and ethnic composition ===
Marrowstone CDP, Washington – Racial and ethnic composition Note: the US Census treats Hispanic/Latino as an ethnic category. This table excludes Latinos from the racial categories and assigns them to a separate category. Hispanics/Latinos may be of any race.
| Race / Ethnicity (NH = Non-Hispanic) | Pop 2000 | Pop 2010 | Pop 2020 | % 2000 | % 2010 | % 2020 |
|---|---|---|---|---|---|---|
| White alone (NH) | 806 | 807 | 910 | 96.30% | 95.62% | 91.46% |
| Black or African American alone (NH) | 0 | 1 | 1 | 0.00% | 0.12% | 0.10% |
| Native American or Alaska Native alone (NH) | 3 | 3 | 3 | 0.36% | 0.36% | 0.30% |
| Asian alone (NH) | 4 | 7 | 5 | 0.48% | 0.83% | 0.50% |
| Native Hawaiian or Pacific Islander alone (NH) | 0 | 0 | 1 | 0.00% | 0.00% | 0.10% |
| Other race alone (NH) | 0 | 0 | 0 | 0.00% | 0.00% | 0.00% |
| Mixed race or Multiracial (NH) | 12 | 18 | 52 | 1.43% | 2.13% | 5.23% |
| Hispanic or Latino (any race) | 12 | 8 | 23 | 1.43% | 0.95% | 2.31% |
| Total | 837 | 844 | 995 | 100.00% | 100.00% | 100.00% |

=== 2000 census ===
As of the census of 2010, there were 844 people, 432 households, and 260 families residing in the CDP. The population density was 133.5 people per square mile (51.5/km^{2}). There were 611 housing units at an average density of 96.6/sq mi (37.4/km^{2}). The racial makeup of the CDP was 96.4% White, 0.4% Native American, 0.8% Asian, 0.1% from other races, and 2.1% from two or more races. Hispanic or Latino of any race were 0.9% of the population.

There were 432 households, out of which 10.4% had children under the age of 18 living with them, 55.1% were married couples living together, 3.7% had a female householder with no husband present, and 39.8% were non-families. 30.3% of all households were made up of individuals, and 16.0% had someone living alone who was 65 years of age or older. The average household size was 1.95 and the average family size was 2.37.

In the CDP, the population skewed older with 90.5% 18 and over, 46.3% over 62, and 36.1% who were 65 years of age or older. The median age was 60.5 years. For every 100 males there were 98.1 females.

The median income for a household in the CDP was $48,533, and the median income for a family was $54,397. Males had a median income of $45,000 versus $26,607 for females. The per capita income for the CDP was $31,146. None of the families and 0.0% of the population were living below the poverty line.

== Cultural events ==
=== Strawberry Festival ===
For approximately 100 years, Marrowstone has held its annual Strawberry Festival in June. Residents and visitors enjoy strawberry shortcake at the Nordland Garden Club Building. Strawberries were once grown all over Marrowstone and can be found growing wild on the island.

=== Tractor Days Parade ===
Every Memorial Day weekend, island residents bring their tractors to parade them in front of the Nordland General Store.

=== Marrowstone Island Community Association ===
The Marrowstone Island Community Association hosts the Strawberry Festival each year. It meets about 7 times throughout the year at the Nordland Garden Club Building.

=== Early Home of Marrowstone Music Festival ===
The Seattle Youth Symphony's Marrowstone Music Festival - now called Marrowstone Summer Music and held on the campus of Western Washington University, in Bellingham, Washington – was held at Fort Flagler on the northern end of Marrowstone Island from 1958 until 1989. Until 1975, it was called the Pacific Northwest Music Camp.

=== Home to modern Eleusianian Mysteries ===
The neo-pagan Aquarian Tabernacle Church performs a modern Eleusinian Mysteries play at Fort Flagler over Easter weekend each year.
