= Port Townsend Bay =

Bay in Washington state, US

Map highlighting the city of Port Townsend, Port Townsend Bay is to the south of the city

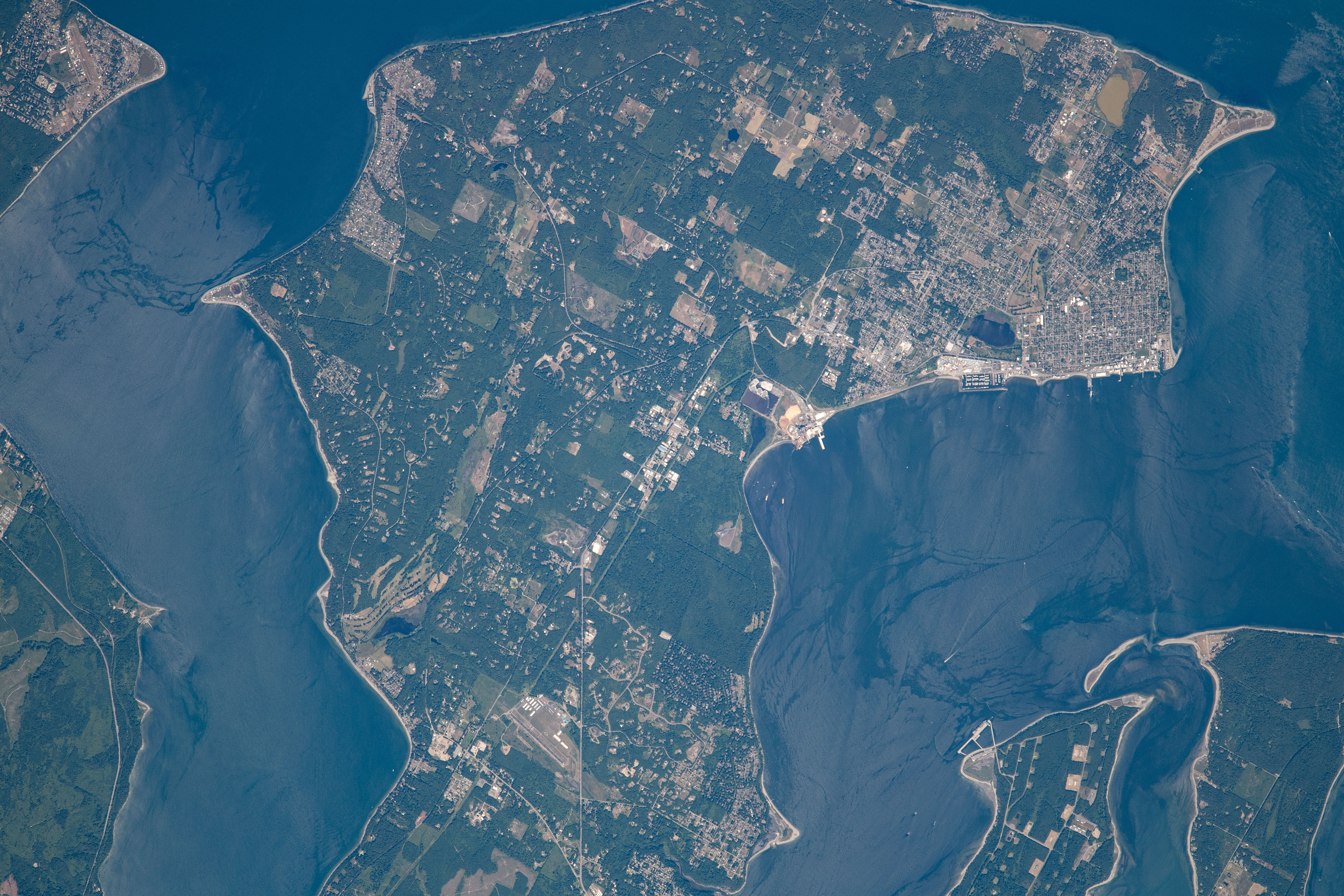
Satellite image showing the city of Port Townsend and Port Townsend Bay

Port Townsend Bay, also called Port Townsend, is a marine inlet off Admiralty Inlet at the northeastern extreme of the Olympic Peninsula in the U.S. state of Washington. It was named Port Townsend by George Vancouver in 1792. The name Port Townsend Bay is sometimes used to distinguish the bay from the city of Port Townsend on its northwestern shore. Another alternate name is Port Townsend Harbor.
