= Admiralty Inlet =

Strait in the U.S. state of Washington

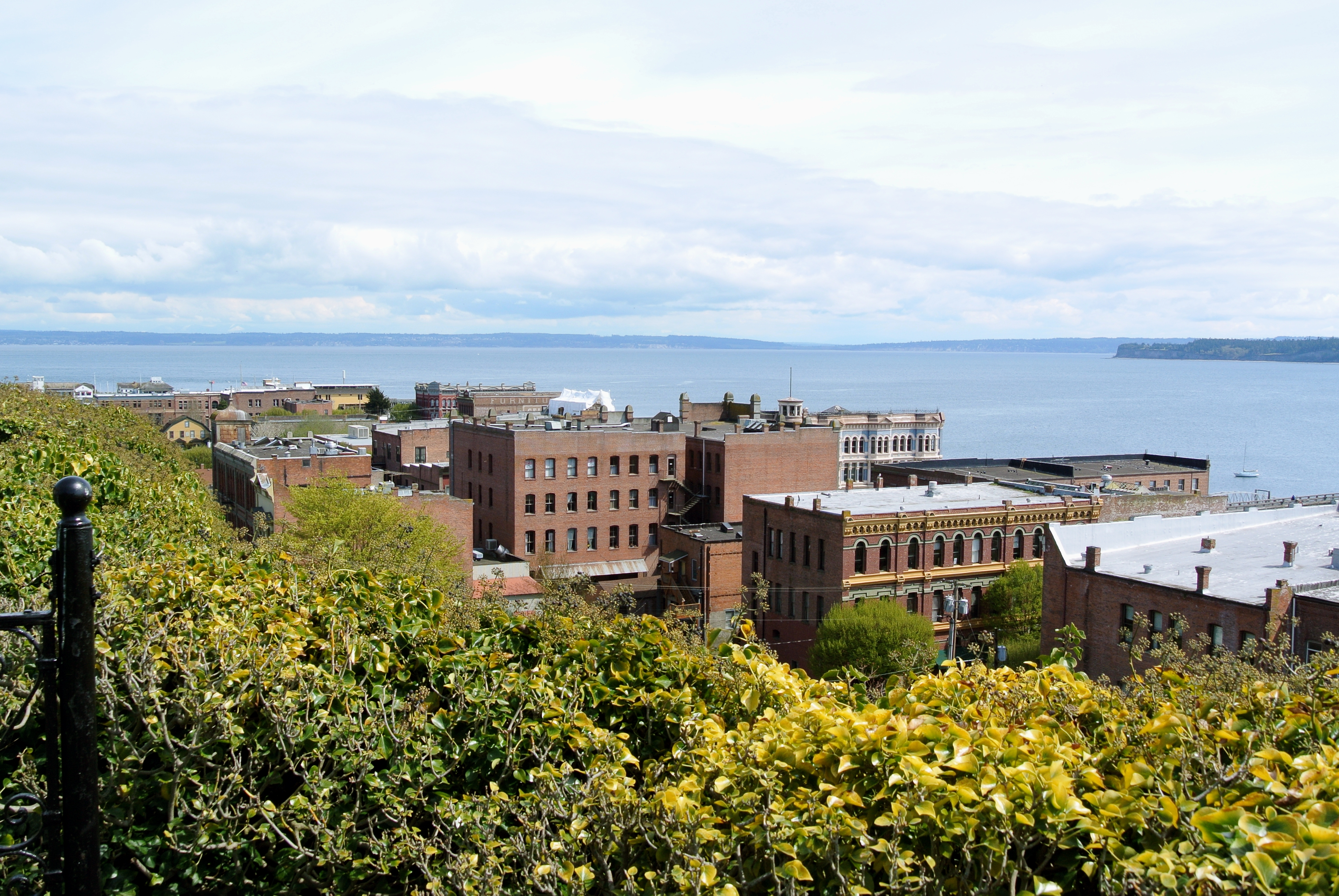
- View of the inlet from Port Townsend

- Location within Washington (state)
- Location: Washington
- Coordinates: 48°9′46.5084″N 122°43′24.6792″W
- Type: Inlet
- Etymology: Board of Admiralty
- Part of: Puget Sound
- Primary inflows: Strait of Juan de Fuca (underwater) and Puget Sound (surface water)
- Primary outflows: Puget Sound (underwater) and Strait of Juan de Fuca (surface water)
- Basin countries: United States and Canada
- Designation: Naval restricted area
- Surface area: 437 kilometres (169 mi)
- Average depth: 35 m (115 ft)
- Water volume: 15,200 cubic metres (540,000 cu ft)
- Shore length^{1}: 171 kilometres (106 mi)
- Islands: 2
- Settlements: Port Townsend, Port Hadlock-Irondale, Port Ludlow, Hansville, Port Gamble
- ^{1} Shore length is not a well-defined measure.

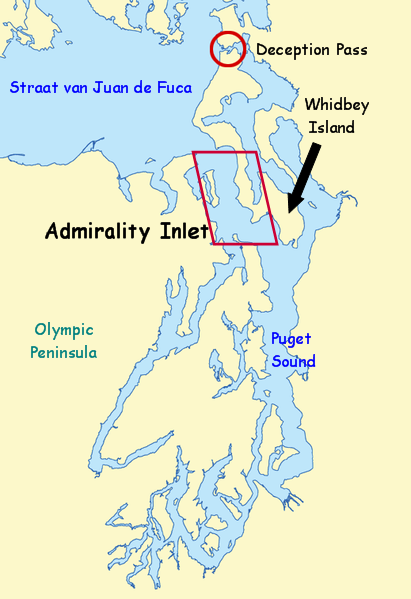
Admiralty Inlet

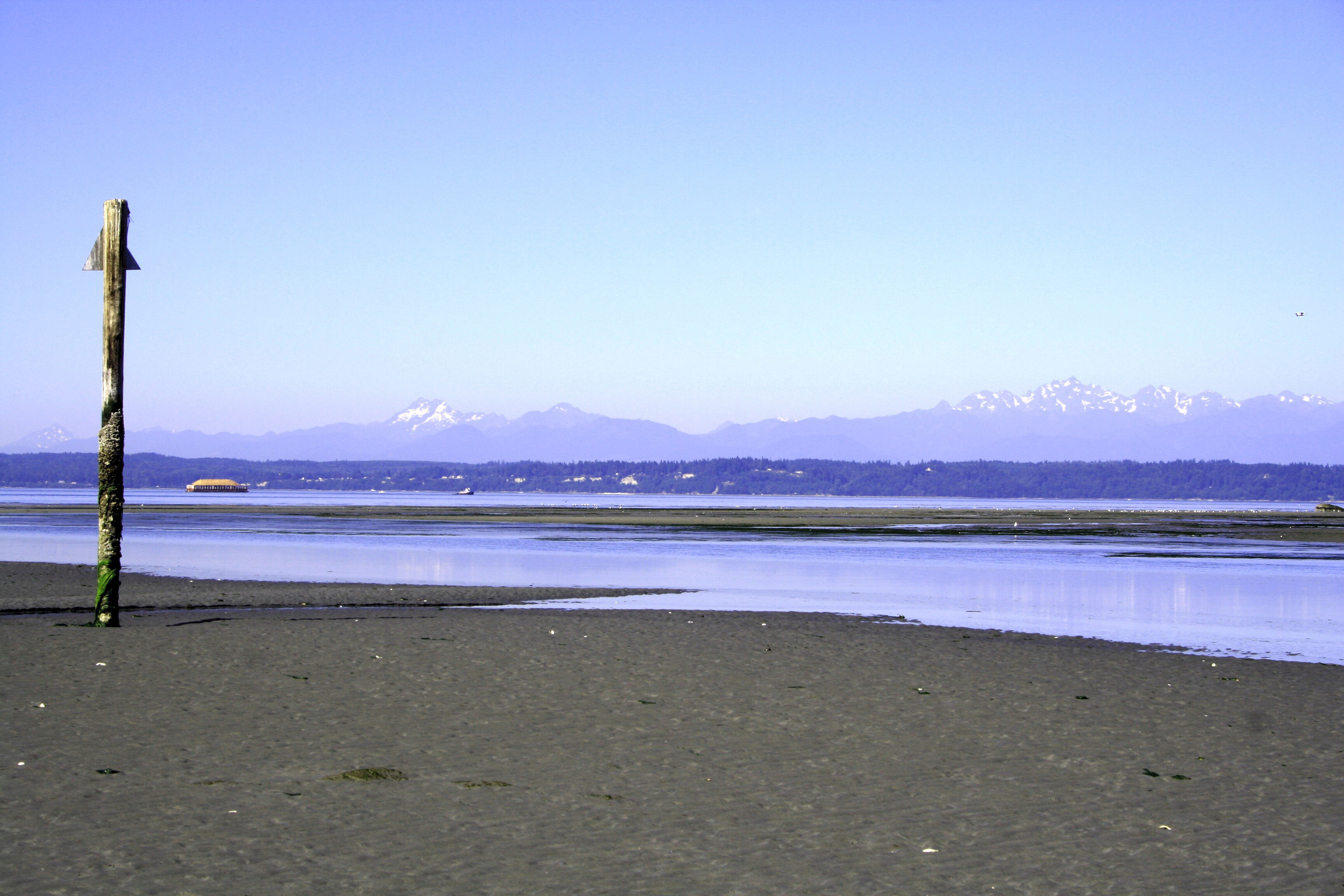
Admiralty Inlet seen at low tide from Whidbey Island

Admiralty Inlet is a strait in the U.S. state of Washington connecting the eastern end of the Strait of Juan de Fuca to Puget Sound. It lies between Whidbey Island and the northeastern part of the Olympic Peninsula.

== Boundaries ==
It is generally considered to be the northern part of Puget Sound's Main Basin. Its northern boundary is defined as a line running between Point Wilson and Point Partridge, and it extends south to the southern end of Whidbey Island and Point No Point on the Kitsap Peninsula, where it joins the Central Basin of Puget Sound's Main Basin. Admiralty Inlet's area is 437 square kilometres (169 sq mi), with a volume of 15,200 cubic metres (540,000 cu ft). Its shoreline is 171 kilometres (106 mi) in length. Its mean depth is 35 metres (115 ft). Though only 6 kilometres (3.7 mi) wide at the narrowest point (between the Point Wilson and Admiralty Head lighthouses), it is through this passage that nearly all the seawater flows into and from Puget Sound during daily tidal variations. Tidal currents can reach six knots in the area northeast of Point Wilson.

All sea vessels must pass through Admiralty Inlet to enter or leave Puget Sound, except those small enough to use Deception Pass or Swinomish Channel. This fact led to the selection of Port Townsend on the Quimper Peninsula as the official port of entry for the Puget Sound region during the early days of commerce in the area. It also led to the federal decision in the late 1890s to construct Fort Worden, Fort Casey, and Fort Flagler around Admiralty Inlet as a "Triangle of Fire" for the protection of Puget Sound from a hostile fleet.

The first Europeans to find and map Admiralty Inlet were the Spanish of the 1790 expedition of Manuel Quimper. It was Quimper's pilot, Juan Carrasco, who sighted the inlet. Thinking it was a bay he named it Ensenada de Caamaño, after the Spanish naval officer Jacinto Caamaño. Two years later Admiralty Inlet was given its present name by George Vancouver, after his ultimate commanders, the Board of Admiralty. The Spanish name was later given to Camano Island.

== Present day ==
Today a great deal of maritime freight traffic passes through Admiralty Inlet to the major shipping ports at Seattle and Tacoma, and of United States Navy vessels to the Naval facilities in Puget Sound. The Keystone-Port Townsend run of the Washington State Ferries crosses the inlet and serves as a link for State Route 20.

A tidal power project was canceled due to costs of monitoring wildlife.
