= General MacCloskey =

- Monro MacCloskey (1902-1983), Brigadier General in the United States Air Force, father of Manus
- Manus MacCloskey (1874-1963), Brigadier General in the United States Air Force, son of Monro
