= Point Wilson Light =

Lighthouse located in Washington

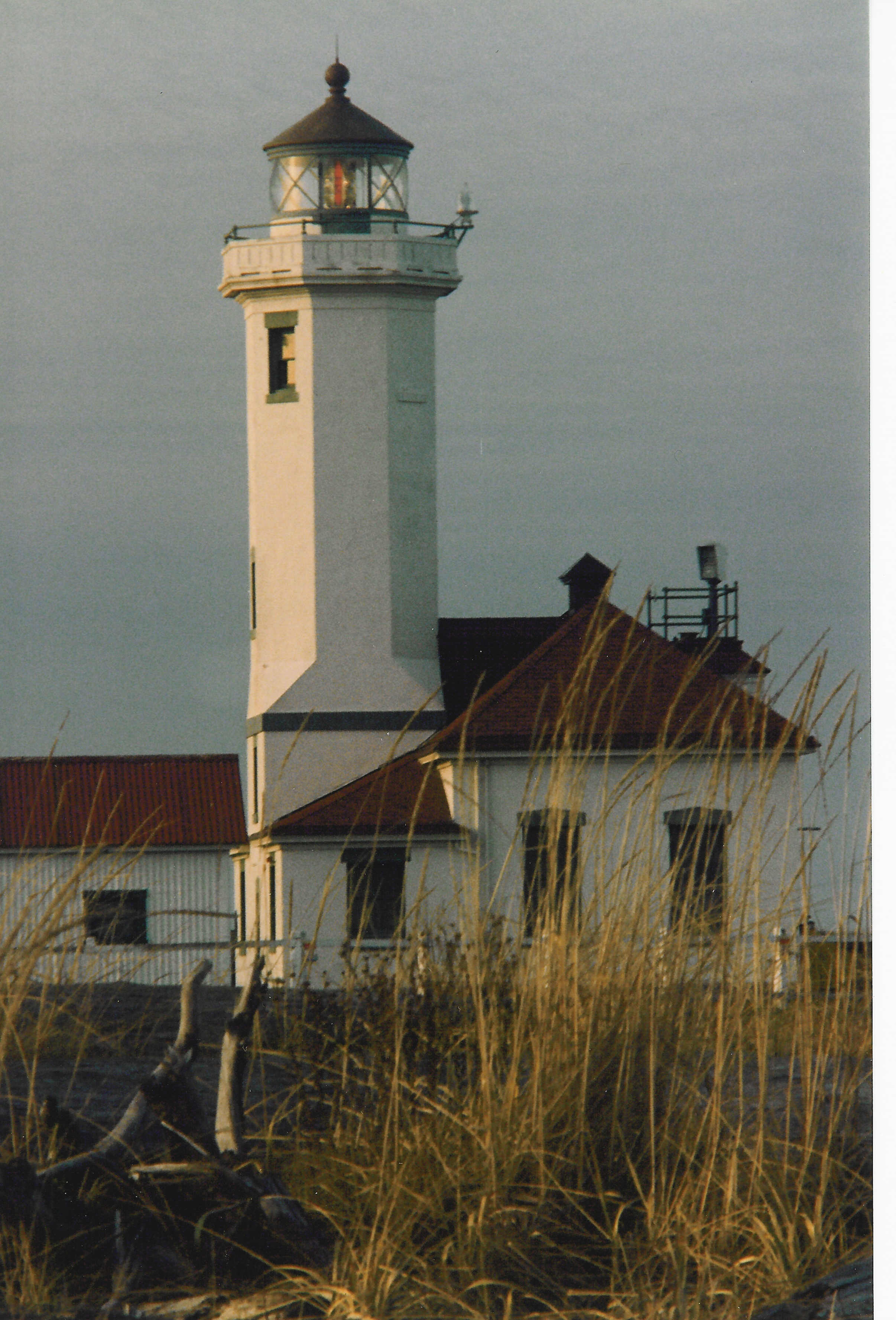
- Location: Western entrance to Admiralty Inlet, Port Townsend, Washington
- Coordinates: 48°8′39″N 122°45′19″W

Tower
- Constructed: 1879 (first); 1914 (second)
- Foundation: Concrete
- Construction: Masonry/concrete
- Automated: 1976
- Height: 46 feet (14 m)
- Shape: Octagonal on fog signal building
- Markings: White with red roof
- Heritage: National Register of Historic Places listed place

Light
- First lit: 1879 (first); 1914 (second)
- Focal height: 51 feet (16 m)
- Lens: Fourth order Fresnel lens
- Range: 16 nmi (30 km; 18 mi) (white), 15 nmi (28 km; 17 mi) (red)
- Characteristic: White light, occulting every 20 s for 5 s, with one red flash in the middle of the occultation
- Point Wilson Light House
- U.S. National Register of Historic Places
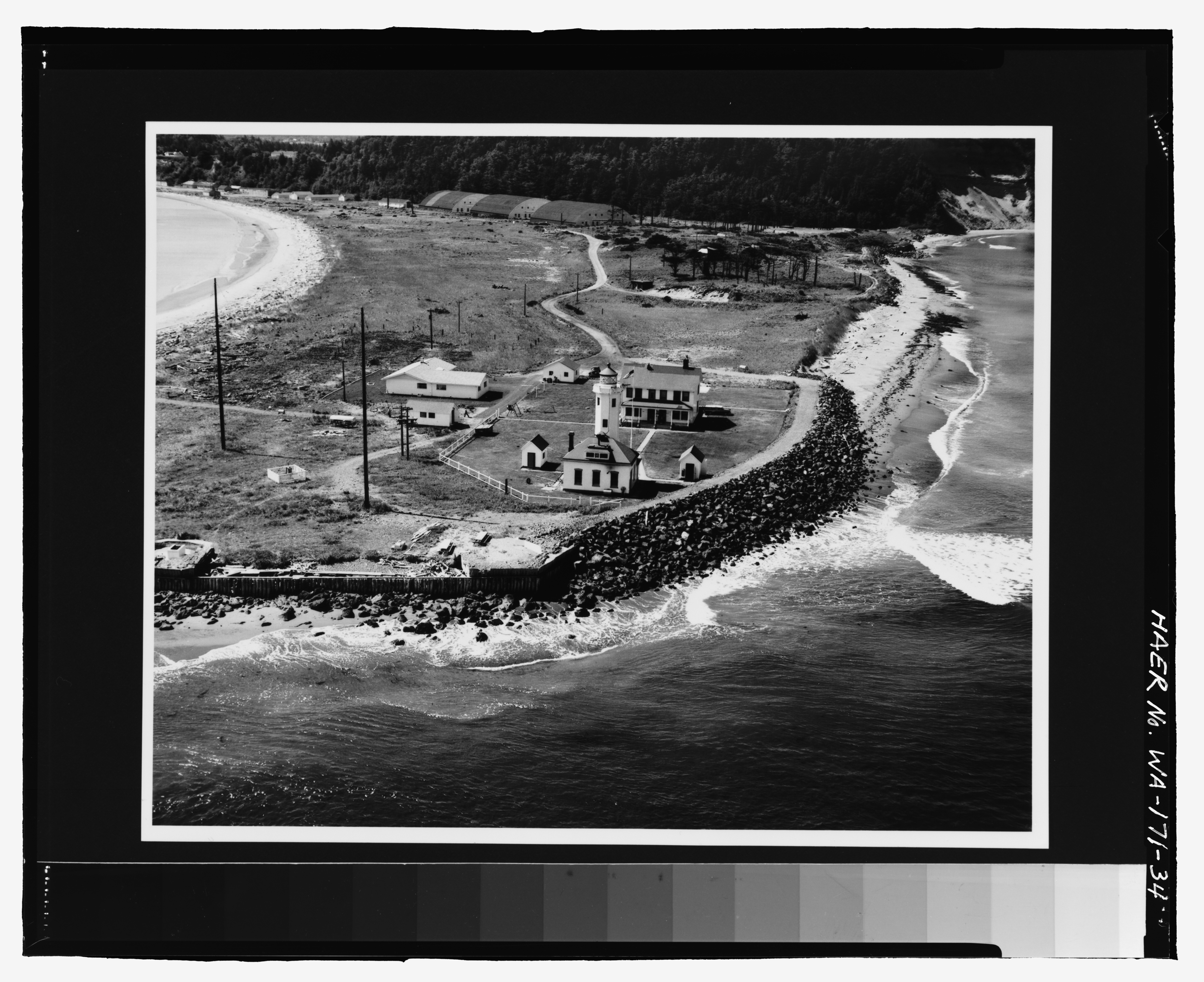
- Area: Less than 10 acres
- NRHP reference No.: 71000870
- Added to NRHP: March 24, 1971

The Point Wilson Light is an active aid to navigation located adjacent to Fort Worden State Park near Port Townsend, Jefferson County, Washington. It is one of the most important navigational aids in the state, overlooking the entrance to Admiralty Inlet, the waterway connecting the Strait of Juan de Fuca and Puget Sound. The lighthouse was listed on the Washington State Heritage Register and the National Register of Historic Places in 1971.

== History ==
Point Wilson's first lighthouse was built in 1879 by the United States Lighthouse Service as a companion to the Admiralty Head Light built some 18 years earlier on the eastern side of Admiralty Inlet. A square wooden tower projecting from the roof of a two-story, Cape Cod–style keeper's quarters held a fixed fourth-order Fresnel lens. The station also included a fog signal building with 12-inch, steam-powered fog whistle.

In 1904, landfill was added to the site in an effort to protect the station, but time and tide having worked their destructive effects, a new lighthouse was commissioned. Completed in 1914, it was built of reinforced concrete with a 46-foot (14 m) octagonal tower designed to withstand the wind. It received the station's original fourth-order Fresnel lens that it continues to display. The beacon's height of 51 feet (16 m) made it the tallest light on Puget Sound. The tower on the original lighthouse was removed and the building continued in use as residence for the keepers. The station was automated in 1976.

Point Wilson Light remains in the hands of the U.S. Coast Guard, while the grounds are managed by Washington State Parks. Its site on the exposed point at Fort Worden State Park is under serious threat from shoreline erosion and rising sea levels.
