= 14th Coast Artillery (United States) =

14th Coast Artillery Regiment
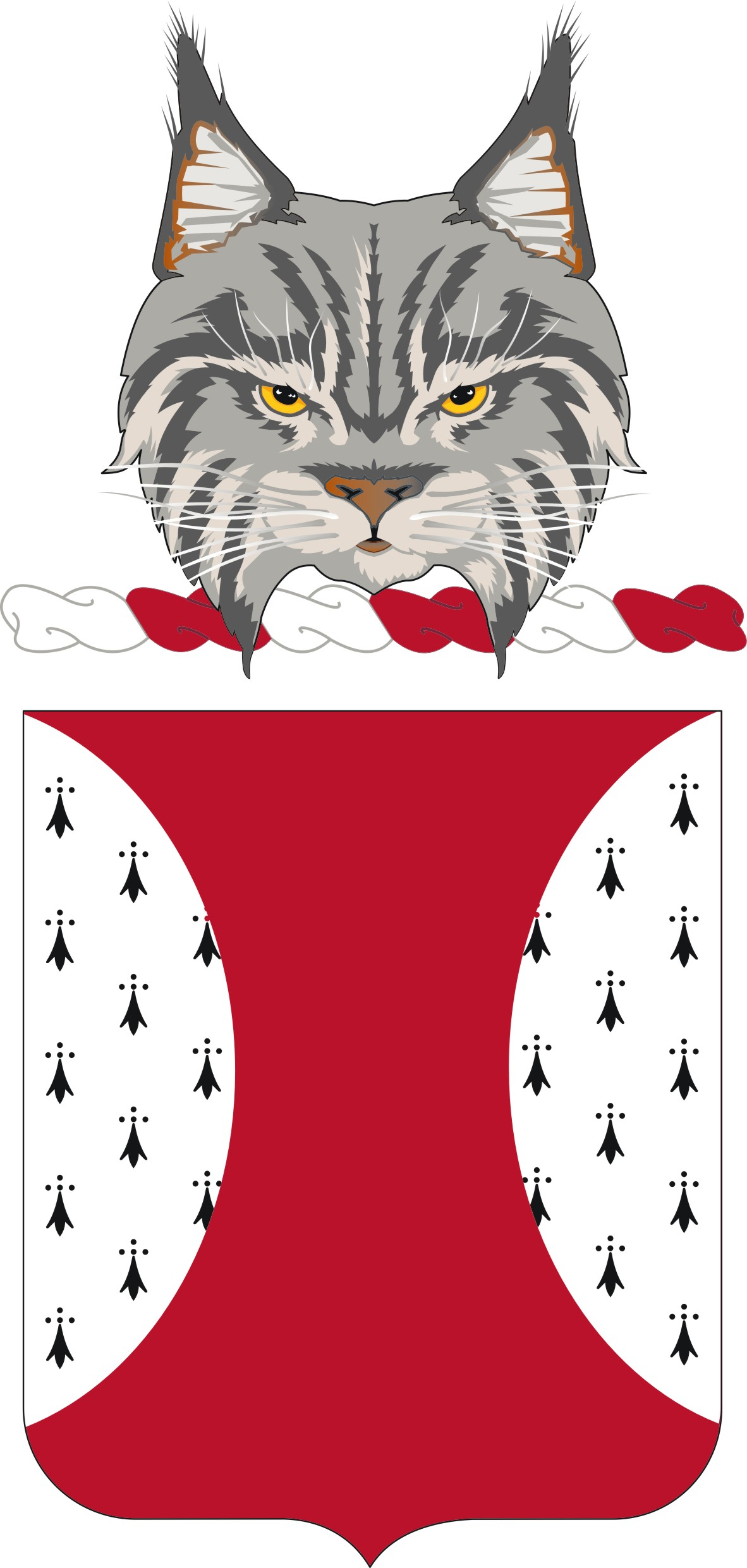
- coat of arms
- Active: 1924 - 1944
- Country: United States
- Branch: Army
- Type: Coast artillery
- Role: Harbor defense
- Size: Regiment
- Part of: Harbor Defenses of Puget Sound
- Garrison/HQ: Fort Worden
- Motto(s): "Semper Vigilans"
- Mascot(s): Oozlefinch

Commanders
- Notable commanders: Colonel Percy M. Kessler

The 14th Coast Artillery Regiment was a Coast Artillery regiment in the United States Army. It served as the Regular Army component of the Harbor Defenses (HD) of Puget Sound, Washington state from 1924 through October 1944, when it was broken up and disbanded as part of an Army-wide reorganization. The 248th Coast Artillery Regiment was the Washington National Guard component of those defenses.

== Lineage ==
Constituted in the Regular Army 27 February 1924 as 14th Coast Artillery (Harbor Defense), and organized 1 July 1924 at Fort Worden by redesignating the following companies of the Coast Artillery Corps (CAC): 106th, 108th, 94th, 92nd, 85th, 149th, 93rd, 150th, 126th, and 160th.

- Regimental Headquarters and Headquarters Battery (HHB) and Batteries A, D, and G activated, primarily as caretaking detachments for HD Puget Sound.
- Battery D inactivated 20 September 1930.
- Battery D reactivated 1 January 1931 with personnel from HHB and Batteries A & G.

1st, 2nd, and 3rd Battalion HHBs constituted as inactive on 12 September 1935 (Battery K disbanded).

- 1st Battalion HHB activated 1 July 1939.
- 2nd Battalion HHB and Batteries B, C, and E activated 3 January 1941 at Fort Worden.
- Batteries A, B, and C moved to Fort Casey on 11 January 1941.
- 1st Battalion HHB moved to Fort Casey on 7 February 1941.
- Batteries F, G, H, I, and K activated at Fort Worden 4 June 1941.
- Battery F moved to Ediz Hook and Agate and Rich Passes to man Anti-Motor Torpedo Boat (AMTB) batteries (90 mm, 37 mm, and/or 40 mm guns) 6 August 1942, where it remained until 1 October 1942, when it moved to Marrowstone Island (Fort Flagler) and Port Townsend, remaining only until 22 October 1942 when it returned to Ediz Hook. Battery F returned to Fort Worden in September 1943.
- Battery C assigned to Fort Whitman 20 December 1941, transferred to Fort Ebey in 1943.
- Battery L (underwater ranging) activated 12 January 1942, inactivated 12 September 1942. This battery provided the Army portion of a joint Army-Navy "hydracoustic ranging station" at Fort Flagler. On 30 August 1942 the Navy assumed full responsibility for this station.
- As new batteries were completed in 1944 (primarily a two-gun 16-inch battery and a two-gun 6-inch battery at Camp Hayden), the regiment's firing batteries moved west to Striped Peak (the prewar place name for the Camp Hayden area).
- Battery E inactivated 27 September 1942.
- Battery I transferred to Camp Barkeley, Texas and inactivated 8 May 1944, personnel to Army Ground Forces.

Regiment broken up 18 October 1944 as follows:

- Battery K (searchlight) redesignated Battery A, HD Puget Sound, 17 October 1944.
- 1st Battalion HHB redesignated as HQ & HQ Detachment (HHD) 14th Coast Artillery Battalion (HD), 17 October 1944.
- 2nd Battalion HHB redesignated as HHD 169th Coast Artillery Battalion (HD), 17 October 1944.
- 3rd Battalion HHB redesignated as HHD 170th Coast Artillery Battalion (HD), 17 October 1944.
- Battery A Redesignated Battery B, 170th Coast Artillery Battalion (HD), 19 October 1944.
- Battery B Redesignated Battery A, 14th Coast Artillery Battalion (HD), 17 October 1944.
- Battery C Redesignated Battery B, 14th Coast Artillery Battalion (HD), 17 October 1944.
- Battery D Redesignated Battery B, 169th Coast Artillery Battalion (HD), 17 October 1944.
- Battery F Redesignated Battery A, 169th Coast Artillery Battalion (HD), 17 October 1944.
- Battery G Redesignated Battery C, 170th Coast Artillery Battalion (HD), 17 October 1944.
- Battery H Redesignated Battery A, 170th Coast Artillery Battalion (HD), 17 October 1944.

14th, 169th, and 170th Coast Artillery Battalions inactivated 15 September 1945.

== Distinctive unit insignia ==
- Description

A gold metal and enamel device 1 inch (2.54 cm) in height overall the head of a northern lynx cropped facing forward silver gray. Attached below and to the sides ending in ribbons behind the lynx's ear is a red scroll inscribed "SEMPER VIGILANS" in gold letters.

- Symbolism

The lynx is characteristic of the country. The motto translates to "Always Watchful."

- Background

The distinctive unit insignia was originally approved for the 14th Coast Artillery Regiment on 21 November 1924. It was redesignated for the 14th Antiaircraft Artillery Gun Battalion on 30 April 1952.

== Coat of arms ==
=== Blazon ===
- Shield

Gules two flaunches ermine.

- Crest

On a wreath of the colors Argent and Gules, the head of a northern lynx caboshed Proper. Motto: SEMPER VIGILANS (Always Watchful).

=== Symbolism ===
- Shield

The Regiment was organized in the Coast Defenses of Puget Sound and the shield, red for Artillery, is the shield of the old Coast Defenses. The flaunches of ermine recall "Astoria" and the fur trade in the early days and by their outline on the shield indicate the contour of the straits.

- Crest

The large, gray, northern lynx is characteristic of the country.

=== Background ===
The coat of arms was originally approved for the 14th Coast Artillery Regiment on 18 November 1924. It was redesignated for the 14th Coast Artillery Battalion on 18 December 1944. The insignia was redesignated for the 14th Antiaircraft Artillery Gun Battalion on 30 April 1952.

== Campaign streamers ==
none

== Decorations ==
none

== See also ==
- Distinctive unit insignia (U.S. Army)
- Seacoast defense in the United States
- United States Army Coast Artillery Corps
- Harbor Defense Command
