= Admiralty Head Light =

Lighthouse on Whidbey Island, Washington, U.S.

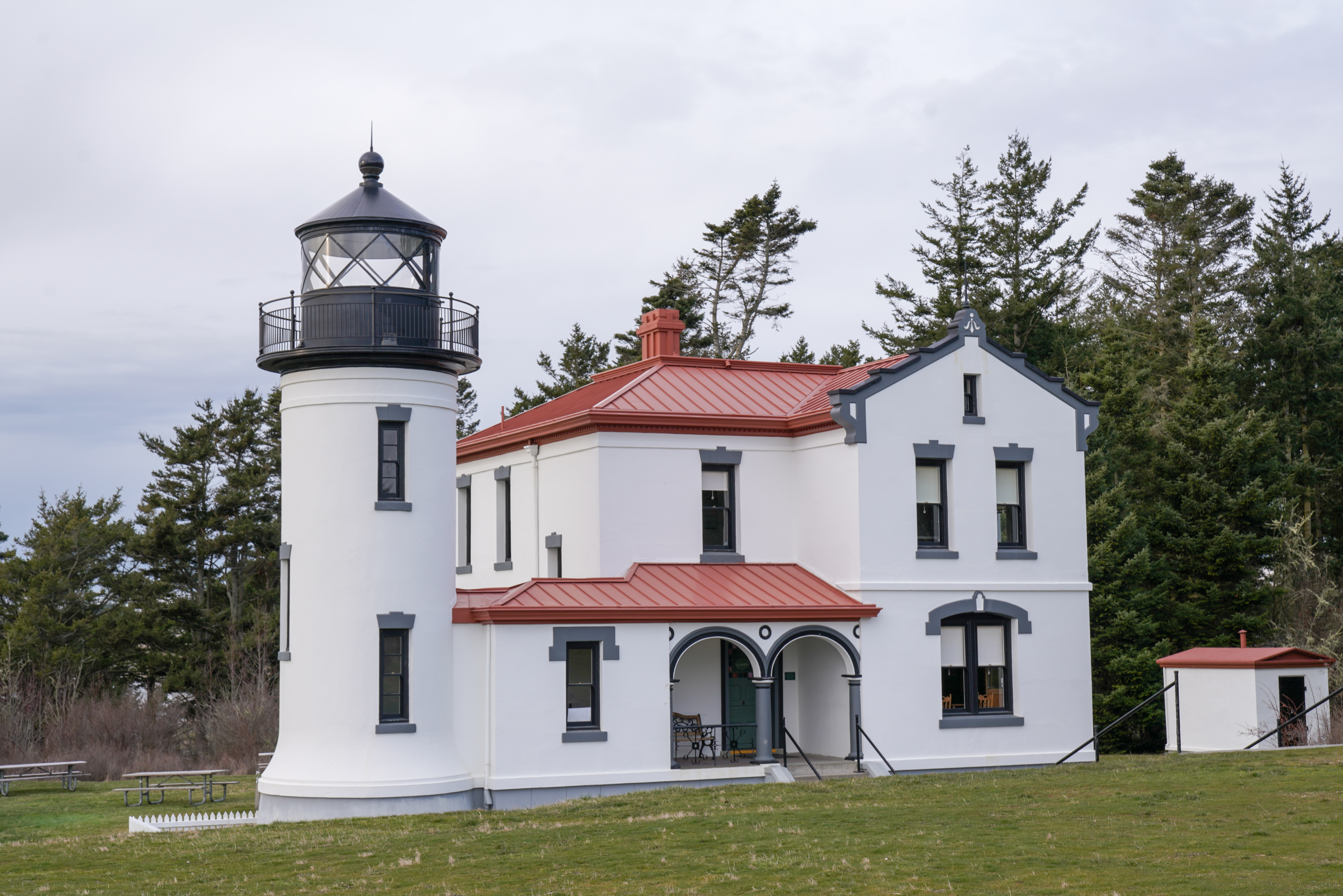
- Location: Coupeville, Washington
- Coordinates: 48°9′38.75″N 122°40′52.2″W

Tower
- Constructed: 1861 (Original); 1903 (Current)
- Foundation: Surface
- Construction: Brick and stucco
- Height: 30 feet (9.1 m) (120 feet (37 m) above sea level)
- Shape: Conical, with an attached Spanish-style structure, 2-story residence
- Markings: White brick tower with black lantern

Light
- First lit: 1903
- Deactivated: 1922
- Focal height: 40 m (130 ft)
- Lens: Fourth order Fresnel lens (removed in 1927)

The Admiralty Head Light is a deactivated aid to navigation located on Whidbey Island near Coupeville, Island County, Washington, on the grounds of Fort Casey State Park. The restored lighthouse overlooks Admiralty Inlet. It was the companion to the Point Wilson Light, which sits four miles away on Admiralty Inlet's western shore.

== History ==
Two lighthouses have been built on Admiralty Head. Only the second remains. Admiralty Head, the east entrance point of Admiralty Inlet, is the southeast extremity of a succession of bluffs extending northward along the western shore of Whidbey Island to Point Partridge, where the bluffs attain their highest elevation.

Original lighthouse

In 1858, the United States purchased 10 acres (4.0 ha) on the headland for $400. The original lighthouse was a wooden, two-story house with tower projecting from the gable. It was completed in 1861. It had a fourth order Fresnel lens, which was visible at 16 miles (26 km). In 1890, construction of Fort Casey forced the relocation of the lighthouse to a spot close to the site of the present lighthouse. It was demolished in 1928.

Present lighthouse

A second, 30-foot-tall (9.1 m) lighthouse, constructed of brick and stucco, was built in 1903. The design by Carl Leick incorporated thick walls meant to withstand earthquakes and the concussion of Fort Casey's guns. The lighthouse was deactivated in 1922, and the lantern moved to the New Dungeness Lighthouse in 1927. During its later occupancy by the Army, the lighthouse was used as a training facility for the K-9 dog program. In 1990, the U.S. Postal Service issued a 25-cent stamp featuring the Admiralty Head Light.

Restoration

The lighthouse has been restored by Washington State Parks and is sponsored by the Lighthouse Environmental Program (LEP), a collaborative function between Washington State University's Extension Office and local environmental programs. In 2012, an historically accurate reconstruction of the lantern house was installed atop the tower. The work was done by student volunteers from three Whidbey Island high schools.
