= Fort Casey =

Park on Whidbey Island, Washington, US

Fort Casey Historical State Park
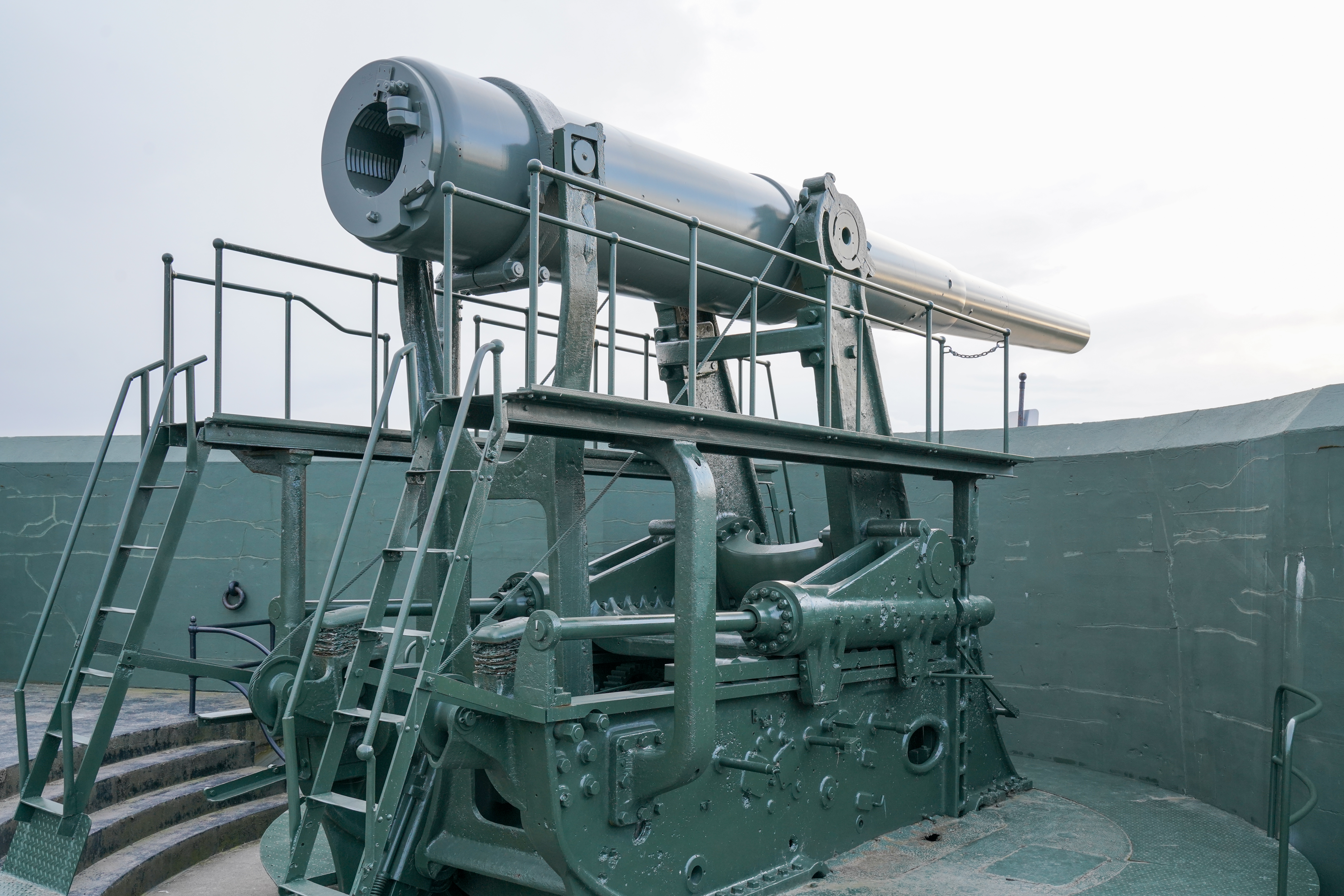
- Fort Casey disappearing gun

- Location within Washington (state) Location within the United States
- Location: Coupeville, Washington, United States
- Coordinates: 48°09′51″N 122°40′44″W
- Area: 999 acres (404 ha)
- Elevation: 20 ft (6.1 m)
- Established: 1955
- Administrator: Washington State Parks and Recreation Commission
- Website: parks.wa.gov/find-parks/state-parks/fort-casey-historical-state-park

Fort Casey was a 19th-century defensive fortification built on Whidbey Island, Island County, Washington, to deter invasion from the sea. It is preserved as Fort Casey Historical State Park, a Washington state park and historic district within the Ebey's Landing National Historical Reserve.

Admiralty Inlet was considered so strategic to the defense of Puget Sound in the 1890s that three forts—Fort Casey on Whidbey Island, Fort Flagler on Marrowstone Island, and Fort Worden at Port Townsend—were built with the intention to create a "triangle of fire" against invading ships. This military strategy was based on the theory that the three fortresses would thwart any invasion attempt by sea.

== History ==
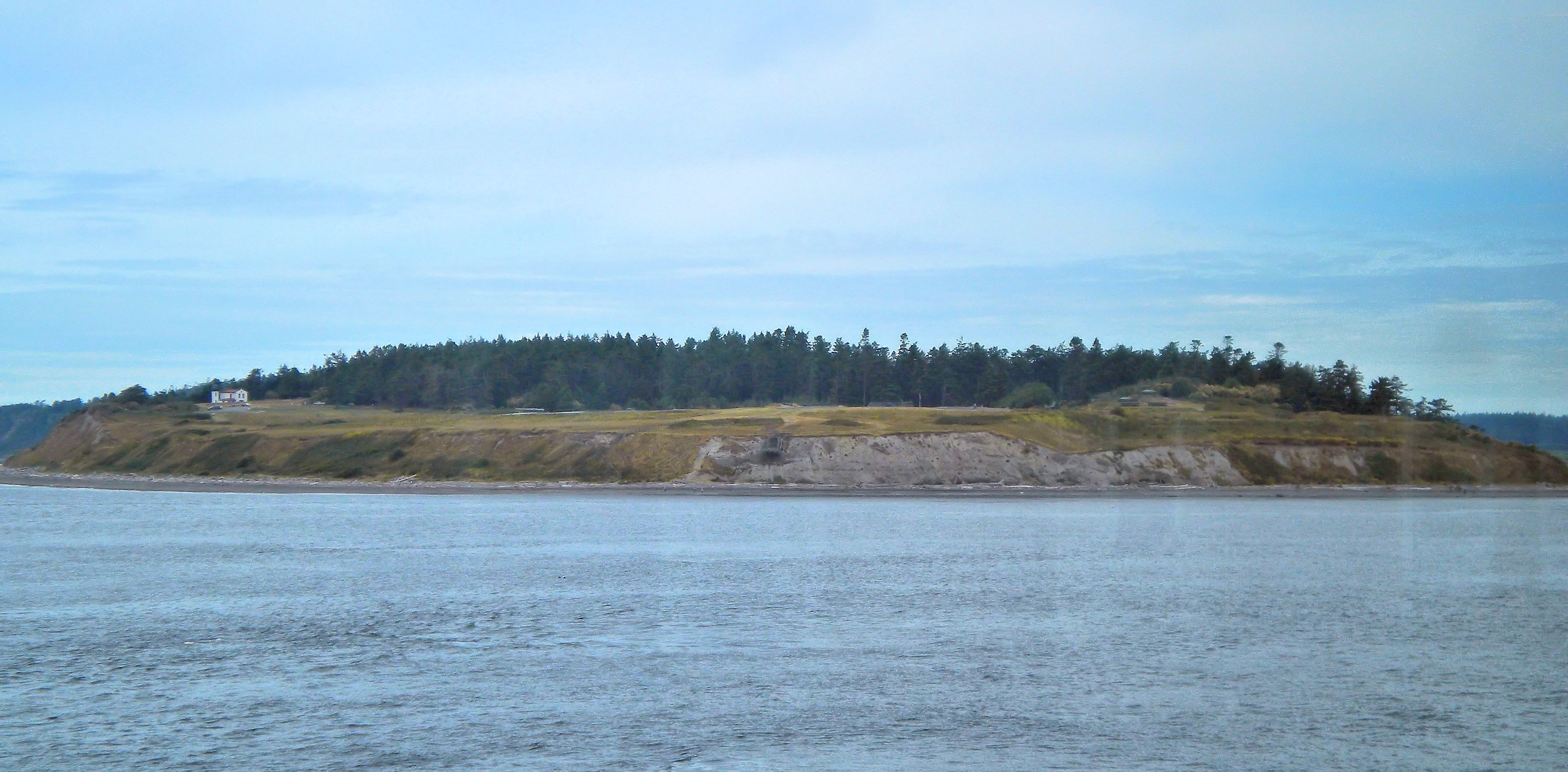
Fort Casey and Admiralty Head Lighthouse from Puget Sound

Fort Casey was named for Brigadier General Thomas Lincoln Casey, U.S. Army Chief of Engineers. Designed as part of the massive modernization program of U.S. seacoast fortifications initiated by the Endicott Board, construction on Fort Casey began in 1897. In 1901, the big guns on disappearing carriages, which could be raised out of their protective emplacements so that the guns were exposed only long enough to fire, became active. However, the fort's batteries became obsolete almost as soon as their construction was completed.

The invention of the airplane in 1903, and the subsequent development of military aircraft made the fort vulnerable to air attack. In addition, the development of battleships designed with increasingly accurate weaponry transformed the static strategies of the nineteenth century into the more mobile attack systems of the twentieth century.

Most of Fort Casey's guns and mortars were removed during World War I, when they were mounted on railcars to serve as mobile heavy artillery. Some of these weapons were returned to the fort after the war, and were scrapped during World War II as 16-inch guns and other weapons at other forts superseded them.

The two 10-inch guns on disappearing carriages currently mounted at Fort Casey were transferred from the Philippines in the 1960s, along with two three-inch guns. The 10-inch guns are M1895MI (No. 26 and No. 28 Watervliet) on disappearing carriages M1901 (No. 13 and No. 15 Watertown) at Battery Worth, Fort Casey (originally at Battery Warwick, Fort Wint, Grande Island, Philippines). The three-inch guns are M1903 (No. 11 and No. 12) on barbette carriages M1903 (No. 6 and No. 7) at Battery Trevor, Fort Casey (originally at Battery Flake, Fort Wint).

== Park features ==
Fort Casey is a 999-acre (404 ha) marine camping park. The Admiralty Head Lighthouse is located within the state park. Three miles of the Pacific Northwest National Scenic Trail wrap around the park.

== See also ==
- 14th Coast Artillery (United States)
- History of Island County, Washington

== Notes ==
=== References ===
- Harris, Alfred W., Comment and Discussion, United States Naval Institute Proceedings, November 1968
- Powers, William M., PHC USN, Comment and Discussion, United States Naval Institute Proceedings, June 1968
- Berhow, Mark A., ed. (2004). American Seacoast Defenses, A Reference Guide (Second ed.). CDSG Press. ISBN 0-9748167-0-1.
