= Monro MacCloskey =

United States Air Force general (1902–1983)

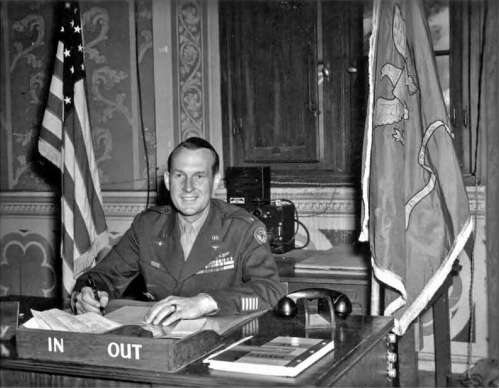
- MacCloskey in May 1945

Personal details
- Born: May 28, 1902 Fort Worden, Washington
- Died: January 29, 1983 (aged 80) Washington, District of Columbia
- Resting place: Arlington National Cemetery
- Parent(s): Manus MacCloskey; Sara Monro
- Awards: Silver Star; Legion of Merit; Distinguished Flying Cross; Air Medal; Croix de Guerre (France); Legion of Honour (France)

Military service
- Allegiance: United States
- Branch/service: United States Air Force
- Years of service: 1924–1957
- Rank: Brigadier General
- Commands: 885th Bombardment Squadron; 2641st Special Group; 28th Air Division
- Battles/wars: World War II

Monro MacCloskey (May 28, 1902 – January 29, 1983) was a Brigadier General in the United States Air Force.

== Early life ==
MacCloskey was born on May 28, 1902, at Fort Worden to Brigadier General Manus MacCloskey and Sara Monro.

== Military career ==
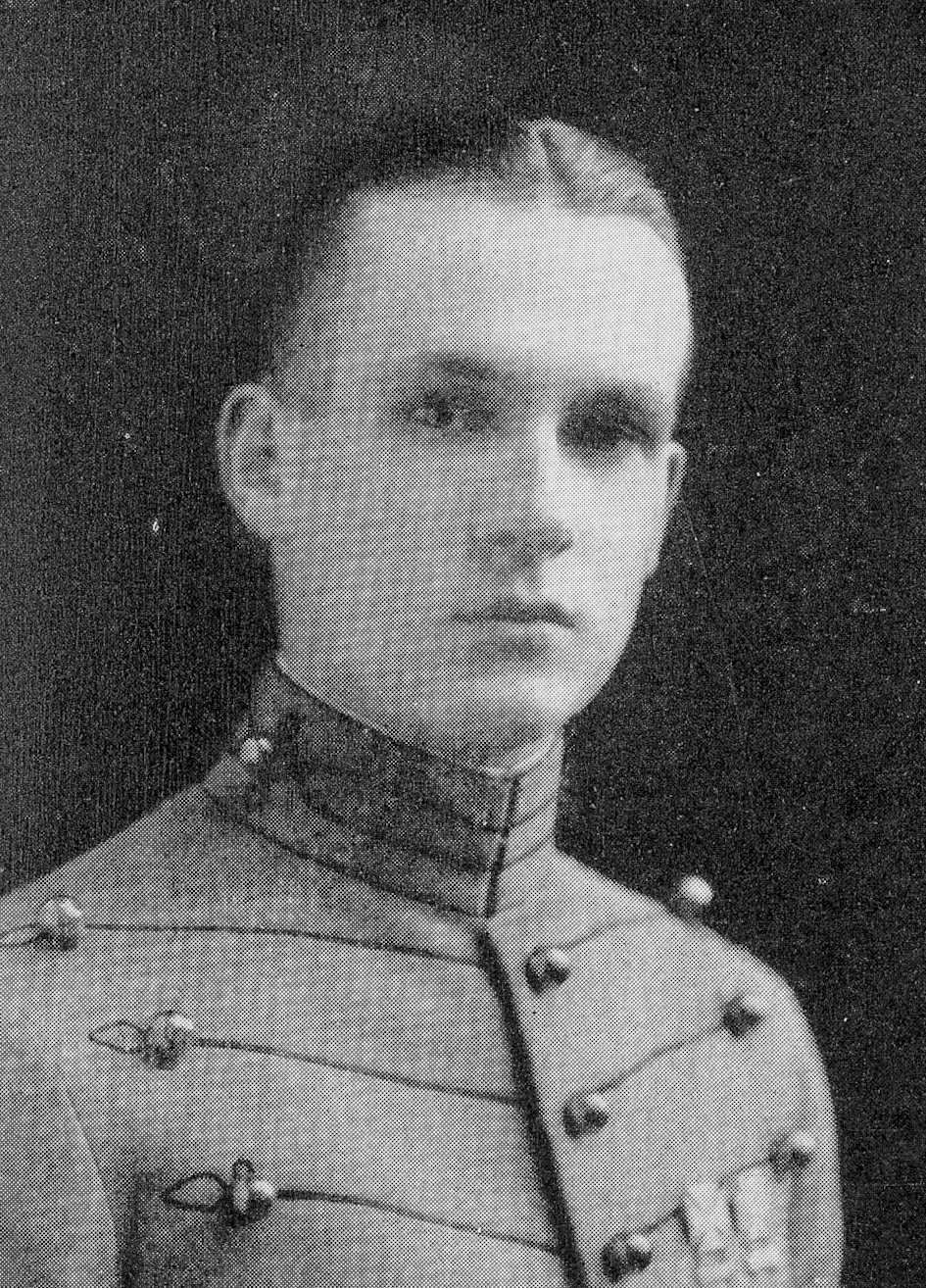
At West Point in 1924

MacCloskey graduated from the United States Military Academy at West Point in 1924 and joined the Field Artillery in the United States Army as a Second Lieutenant. He resigned his commission in 1929 but joined the Air Corps of the National Guard. He was called up for active duty in February 1941.

During World War II, he served with the Twelfth Air Force and the Mediterranean Air Command before assuming command of the 885th Bombardment Squadron and the 2641st Special Group.

Following the war, he was assigned to the Pentagon and was named air attaché in Paris, France. His later commands included the 28th Air Division. MacCloskey was a close friend of Air Force Chief of Staff Hoyt Vandenberg, and assisted in the organization of Vandenberg's funeral in 1954.

MacCloskey's retirement from the Air Force was effective as of July 1, 1957. He then joined the Avco Manufacturing Company at their Crosley Broadcasting Corporation division.

== Awards ==
The awards he received during his career included the Silver Star, the Legion of Merit, the Distinguished Flying Cross, the Air Medal with silver oak leaf cluster and two bronze oak leaf clusters, as well as the Croix de Guerre and the Legion of Honour of France.

== Death and legacy ==
He died on January 29, 1983, in Washington, District of Columbia. He was buried at Arlington National Cemetery alongside his father.
