= Fort Worden =

Former Army installation in Washington

Fort Worden Historical State Park
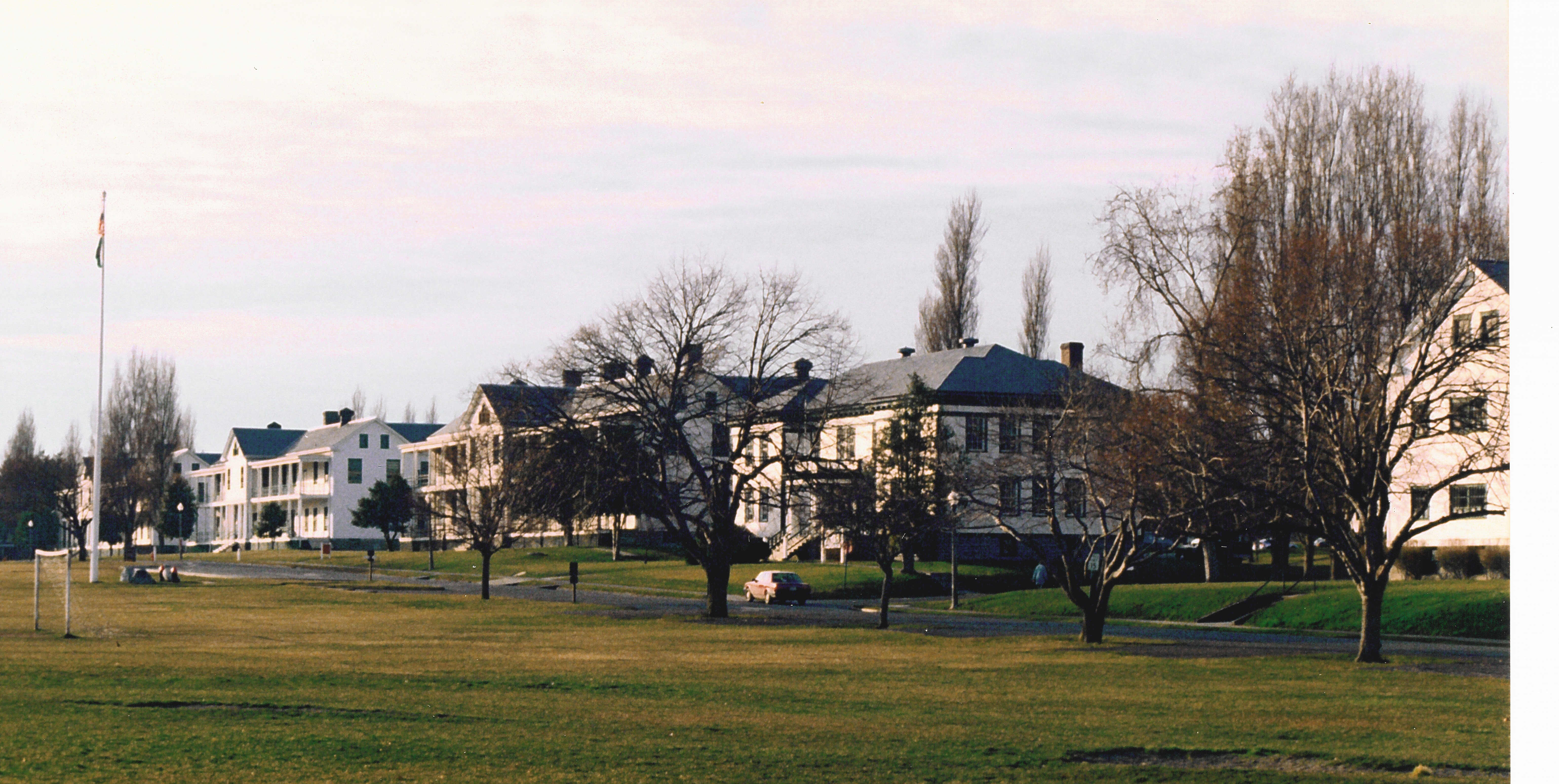
- Historic buildings at Fort Worden

- Location within Washington (state) Location within the United States
- Location: Port Townsend, Washington, United States
- Coordinates: 48.138°N 122.768°W
- Area: 432 acres (175 ha)
- Established: 1973
- Administrator: Washington State Parks and Recreation Commission
- Website: Official website
- Fort Worden
- U.S. National Register of Historic Places
- U.S. National Historic Landmark District
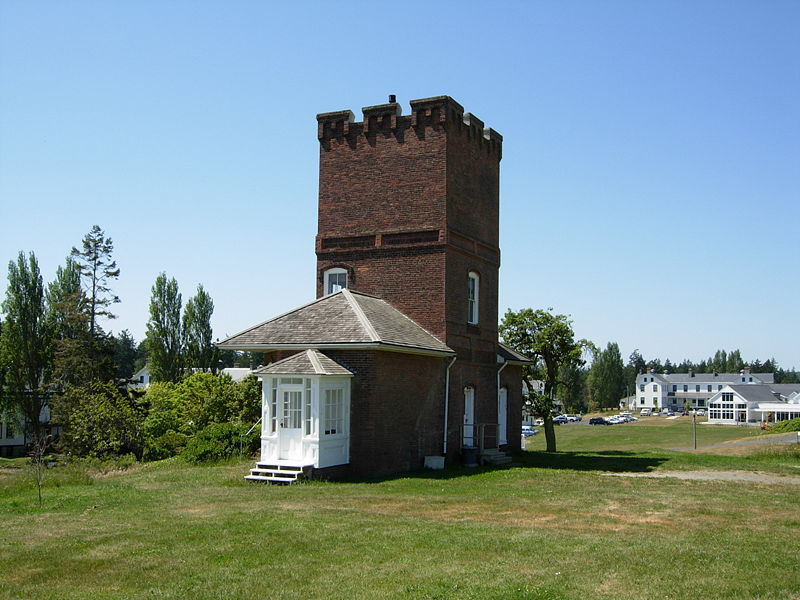
- Alexander's Castle at Fort Worden
- Location: Cherry and W Sts. Port Townsend, Washington
- Architect: US Government War Dept.
- NRHP reference No.: 74001954

Significant dates
- Added to NRHP: March 15, 1974
- Designated NHLD: December 8, 1976

Fort Worden Historical State Park is located in Port Townsend, Washington, on 433 acres (175 hectares) originally known as Fort Worden, a United States Army Coast Artillery Corps base constructed to protect Puget Sound from invasion by sea. Fort Worden was named after U.S. Navy Rear Admiral John Lorimer Worden, commander of USS Monitor during the famous Battle of Hampton Roads during the American Civil War.

Constructed between 1898 and 1920, Fort Worden was one of the largest Endicott Period (1890–1910) forts to be built and a rare example of a post built according to the precepts of the Endicott Board on land not already occupied by an existing fortification. It was located within sight of a potential (if unlikely) enemy fortification, a British Royal Navy installation on Vancouver Island in Canada. The fort was designated a National Historic Landmark in 1976.

== History ==
Fort Worden was an active United States Army base from 1902 to 1953. Most of it was purchased by the Port of Port Townsend in 1956 and sold to the State of Washington in 1957 to house a juvenile detention facility (the Port retained ownership of the beach from the entrance of the Fort to approximately the pier). In 1971, use was transferred to the Washington State Parks and Recreation Commission and Fort Worden State Park was opened in 1973.

=== Strategic location ===
In the 1890s, Admiralty Inlet was considered strategic to the defense of Puget Sound in that three forts—Fort Worden, Fort Flagler, and Fort Casey—were built at the entrance with their powerful artillery creating a "Triangle of Fire" to thwart any invasion attempt by sea. Fort Worden, on the Quimper Peninsula, at the extreme northeastern tip of the Olympic Peninsula, sits on a bluff near Port Townsend, anchoring the northwest side of the triangle. The three posts were designed to prevent a hostile fleet from reaching such targets as the Puget Sound Naval Shipyard and the cities of Seattle, Tacoma and Everett.

The forts never fired a hostile shot, and many of the guns were removed during World War I for use in Europe; all remaining now-obsolete guns were scrapped during World War II. Subsequently, Fort Worden was used for training a variety of military personnel and for other defense purposes.

=== Construction ===
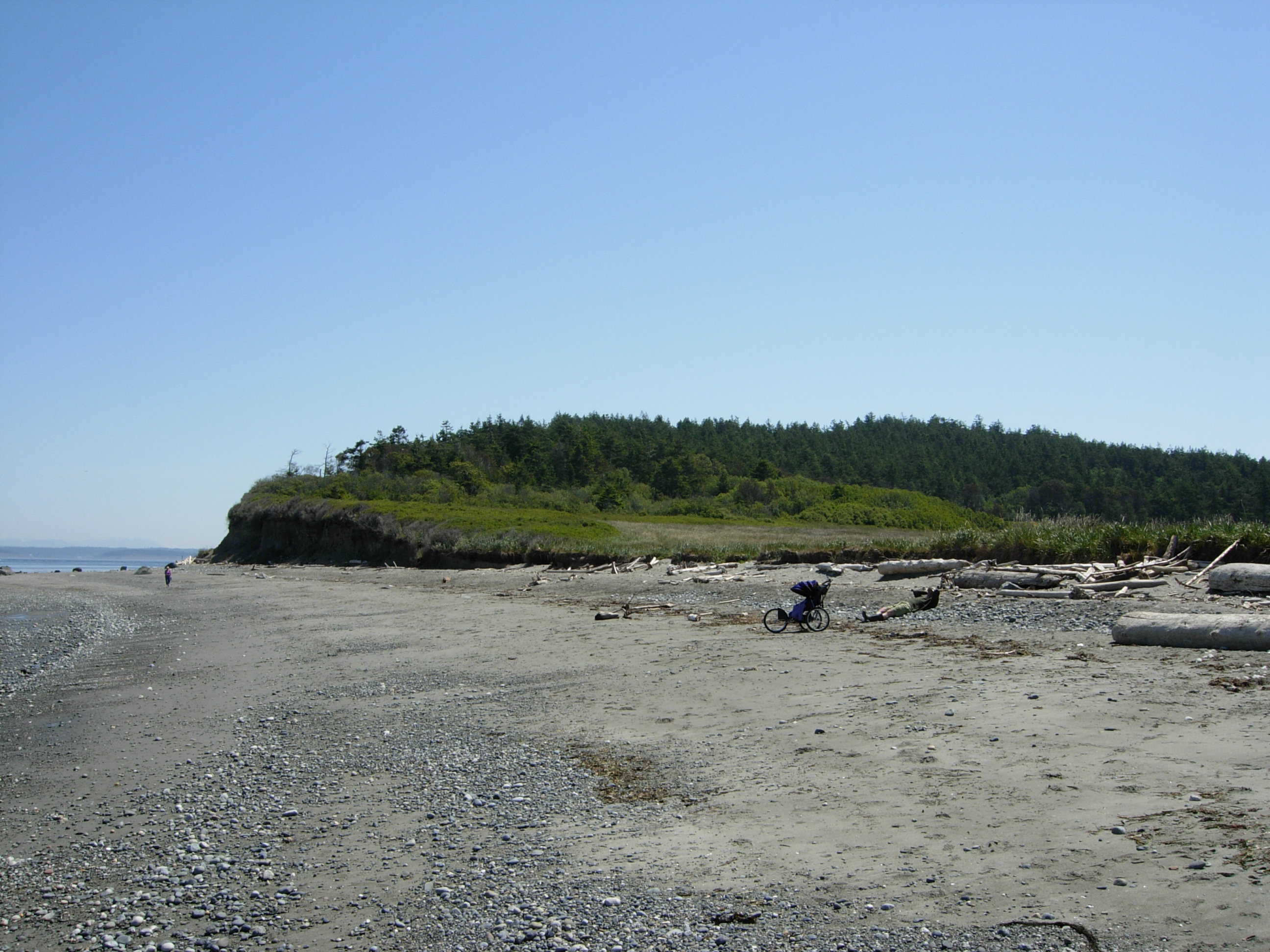
The North Beach at Fort Worden.

The oldest building on the post is Alexander's Castle, a brick residence built in 1883 by Reverend John Barrow Alexander (1850–1930) which pre-dates the military presence. A British citizen, Alexander was the rector of St. Paul's Episcopal Church in Port Townsend from 1882 to 1886, as well as Queen Victoria's British Vice Consul in Port Townsend and Tacoma from 1884 to 1897. The building was acquired by the government in 1897.

The construction of Fort Worden began in 1897, continuing in one form or another until the base was closed in 1953.

Designed as part of the massive modernization program of U.S. seacoast fortifications initiated by the Endicott Board, construction work on the initial fortifications above Point Wilson were delayed until July 1897. The property was privately owned and the government had to clear title to the land through condemnation proceedings. The Army Corps of Engineers took charge of building the construction dock, warehouses, and a tramway to haul concrete for the gun emplacements from the dock to the mixing plant. All cement for the batteries was imported from Belgium, shipped around Cape Horn and unloaded at Point Wilson. To meet construction needs, the Army laid a pipeline from Port Townsend and pumped water into large storage tanks inside the fort. The arrival of wet winter weather slowed progress on the batteries. It took 200 men almost three years to complete the excavation and concrete work for the gun emplacements.

In March 1900, the fortifications were ready for installation of the initial armaments. Sixteen artillery pieces, shipped from the armory at Columbus, Ohio, arrived from Tacoma by barge. A special tramway was constructed to haul the heavy artillery pieces from the dock area to top of the bluff. In March 1901, the guns were moved to their assigned positions and mounted in the batteries, ready for test firing.

Fort Worden was activated in 1902. The 126th Coast Artillery Company, consisting of 87 soldiers commanded by Captain Manus McCloskey, was the first detachment assigned to Fort Worden. They arrived from Seattle on board the steamer SS Majestic on May 3, 1902, and were quartered in tents pending the completion of the company barracks. Twenty-three permanent buildings were under construction at a cost of $59,450. A communication system, connecting the three forts by armored cable, was installed in 1903.

=== Military use ===
On September 4, 1904, the headquarters of the Harbor Defense Command of Puget Sound was transferred from Fort Flagler to Fort Worden along with the 6th Artillery Band. Once work on the main batteries and army post had been completed, more troops were assigned there. By the fall of 1905, Fort Worden was fully staffed with four Coast Artillery companies, and the harbor defense system, costing approximately $7.5 million, was considered complete and operational. The initial armaments consisted of six gun emplacements: Batteries Randol, Quarles, Ash, Powell, Brannon, and Vicars. Between 1905 and 1910, six additional gun emplacements were added: Batteries Benson, Tolles, Walker, Stoddard, Putnam, and Kinzie. When completed, Fort Worden had 41 artillery pieces, completing its point in the "Triangle of Fire": two 12-inch disappearing guns, two 12-inch barbette guns, two 10-inch disappearing guns, five 10-inch barbette guns, eight 6-inch disappearing guns, two 5-inch balanced pillar guns, four 3-inch pedestal guns, and sixteen 12-inch mortars.

During World War I, the complement at Fort Worden was greatly expanded as soldiers arrived for training prior to being sent to European battlefields. To keep up with the demand, construction of new barracks and buildings continued throughout the war. 36 of 41 artillery pieces were dismantled and shipped to arsenals to be retrofitted for usage on European battlefields; many were never replaced. After World War I, the fort's staffing was reduced to 50 officers and 884 enlisted men.

In its intended role, Fort Worden was obsolete soon after construction: the rapid advance in warship and gunnery design, as well as the advent of aircraft, quickly made fixed artillery positions ineffective and greatly diminished the role of coastal artillery in national defense. In the 1920s, an observation balloon hangar was built at Fort Worden at a cost of $85,000. During this time, some of the batteries were modernized to be made "bomb-proof."

During World War II, Fort Worden remained the headquarters of the Harbor Defense Command and it was jointly operated by the Army and Navy. The fort was home to the 14th Coast Artillery Regiment of the U.S. Army, the 248th Coast Artillery Regiment of the Washington National Guard, the 2nd Amphibious Engineers, and miscellaneous U.S. Navy personnel. The Army operated radar sites and coordinated Canadian and U.S. defense activities in the Strait of Juan de Fuca and Puget Sound. The Navy, responsible for the detection and identification of all vessels entering and leaving Puget Sound, monitored new underwater sonar and sensing devices. Fixed anti-aircraft positions were installed behind Battery Benson and south of the mortar batteries. Fort Worden personnel also manned batteries and fire control towers at the Cape George Military Reservation, six miles (9.7 km) southwest of Port Townsend on the Strait of Juan de Fuca at the entrance to Discovery Bay.

After World War II, the Coast Artillery units at Fort Worden were disbanded and the remaining guns were removed or scrapped. It remained active as an administrative unit until June 30, 1953, when the Harbor Defense Command was deactivated and the fort officially closed, ending fifty-one years of military jurisdiction.

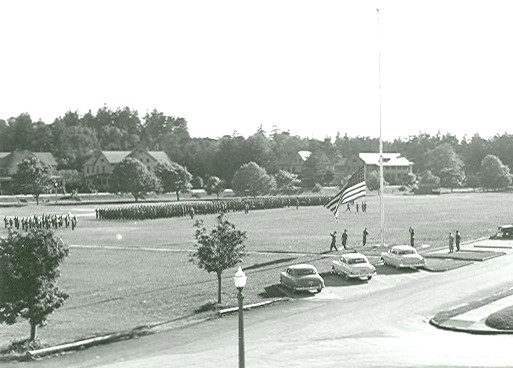
369th Engineer Boat and Shore Regiment retreat parade, May 1951

Following World War II, the 2nd Engineer Special Brigade was stationed at Fort Worden. At the outset of the Korean War, the 2nd Engineer Special Brigade was among the first Army units ordered to Korea to reinforce the Far East Command. After the departure in the summer of 1950 of the 2nd Engineer Special Brigade for Korea, an Army Reserve unit, the 369th Engineer Boat and Shore Regiment (later re-designated the 369th Engineer Amphibious Support Regiment), was stationed at Fort Worden where the regiment trained engineer replacements. The 369th was a subordinate unit of the 409th Engineer Special Brigade. The regimental headquarters and the boat battalion were stationed at Fort Worden. The regiment's shore battalion was located at Fort Flagler. The 369th Engineer Amphibious Support Regiment was demobilized in 1953.

On July 1, 1957, the State of Washington purchased Fort Worden for $127,533 for use as a diagnostic and treatment center for troubled youths.

== Batteries ==
Coastal artillery batteries located at Fort Worden were:

Primary batteries

- Battery Randol (1900–1918), located on Artillery Hill. It contained two M1888MII 10-inch guns on barbette carriages. Named after Brevet Brigadier General Alanson Merwin Randol, veteran of the Civil War (1st U.S. Artillery/ 2nd New York Volunteer Cavalry Regiment), who died in 1887.
- Battery Quarles (1900–1941), located on Artillery Hill. It contained three M1888MI 10-inch guns on barbette carriages. Named after Captain Augustus Quarles, 15th U.S. Infantry, who died August 30, 1847, at the Battle of Churubusco.
  - Two 10-inch guns and carriages from Battery Quarles were sent to Fort McNutt, McNutts Island, Nova Scotia during World War II, where they remain.
- Battery Ash (1900–1942), located on Artillery Hill. Contained two M1888MII 12-inch guns on barbette carriages. Named after Brevet Lt. Col Joseph Penrose Ash, 5th U.S. Cavalry, who died May 8, 1864, at the Battle of Todd's Tavern.

** Batteries Randol, Quarles, and Ash were originally built as one continuous unnamed battery until 1904—now referred to as the main gun line.

- Battery Benson (1907–1943), located on Artillery Hill. It contained two M1900 10-inch guns on disappearing carriages. Named after Captain Henry Benson, Battery M, 2nd U.S. Artillery, who died August 11, 1862, from wounds received in an engagement at Malvern Hill on August 5, 1862.
  - During the 1950s, Battery Benson was equipped with a Nike Ajax missile early-warning radar array, installed on a cinder block pedestal which remains.
- Battery Kinzie (1910–1944), located west of Point Wilson, built onto the west end of Battery Vicars, contained two M1895MI 12-inch guns on disappearing carriages. Named after Brigadier General David Hunter Kinzie, veteran of the Civil War (commander, Battery K, 5th U.S. Artillery at the Battle of Gettysburg), who died in 1904.

Secondary batteries

- Battery Tolles (1905–1943), located on Artillery Hill. Contained four M1903 6-inch guns on disappearing carriages. Named after Captain/Brevet Lt. Colonel Cornelius Williams Tolles, 13th U.S. Infantry, Chief Quartermaster to General Philip Sheridan, who died November 8, 1864, from wounds sustained October 11, 1864 when ambushed by Mosby's Rangers near Newtown, Virginia.

** Battery Tolles B (1937–1946); replacement of guns in emplacements 3 and 4 (removed during World War I) with two M1900 6-inch guns, platform retrofitted for masked parapet carriages.

- Battery Stoddard (1906–1917), located on bluff facing Admiralty Inlet. Contained four M1903 6-inch guns on disappearing carriages. Named after Major Amos Stoddard, 1st U.S. Artillery, who died May 11, 1813, from wounds received at the Siege of Fort Meigs.
- Battery Vicars (1902–1917), located west of Point Wilson, attached to Battery Kinzie. Contained two M1897 5-inch guns on balanced pillar mounts. Named after 1st Lieutenant Thomas Allen Vicars, 27th U.S. Infantry Regiment, who died May 2, 1902, in the assault of Pandapatan Cotta at the Battle of Bayan during the Moro Rebellion of the Philippine–American War.
  - Both 5-inch guns were removed and sent to Europe during World War I; they were never returned to Fort Worden, but one tube currently exists as a monument in Chewsville, Maryland.
- Battery Putnam (1907–1945), located on bluff facing Admiralty Inlet. Contained two M1903 3-inch guns on pedestal mounts. Named after Colonel Haldimand Sumner Putnam, 7th New Hampshire Volunteer Infantry, who died July 18, 1863, at the Second Battle of Fort Wagner.
- Battery Walker (1907–1946), located on Artillery Hill. Contained two M1903 3-inch guns on pedestal mounts. Named after Captain Samuel Hamilton Walker, Texas Rangers, who died October 9, 1843, at the Battle of Huamantla.
- AMTB (Anti Motor Torpedo Boat) Battery Point Wilson (1943–1946), (2 fixed /2 towed 90 mm guns) of which one gun block is now in the surf.

Mortar batteries

- Battery Brannan (1901–1943), located on Artillery Hill. Contained eight M1890MI 12-inch mortars in two pit emplacements. Named after Brevet Major General John Milton Brannan, veteran of the Mexican–American War and Civil War.
- Battery Powell (1901–1943), located next to Battery Brannan. Contained eight M1890MI 12-inch mortars in two pit emplacements. Named after Major James Edwin Powell, 25th Missouri Volunteer Infantry, who died April 6, 1862, at the Battle of Shiloh.
  - In 1918, half the mortars were removed from each battery; a total of two from each of the four emplacements.

Note: All armaments were removed in the 1940s, no period weapons or mounts remain.

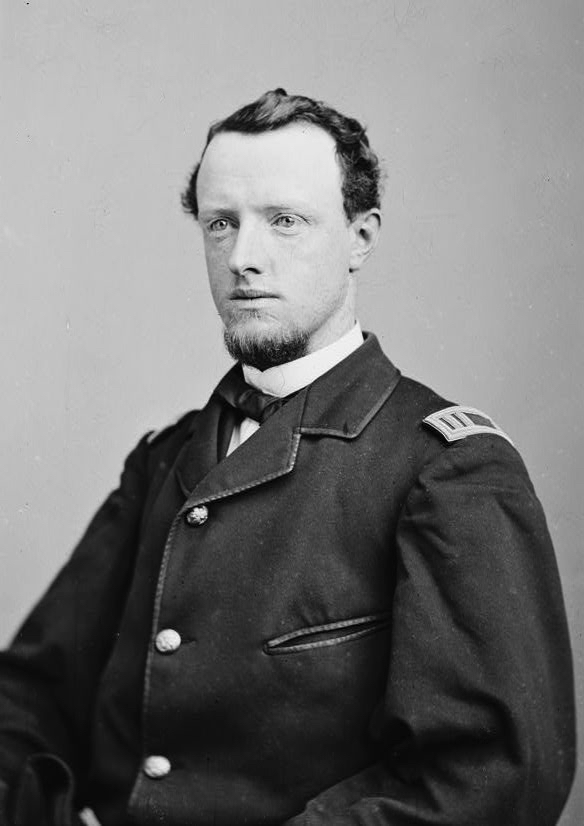
Alanson Merwin Randol

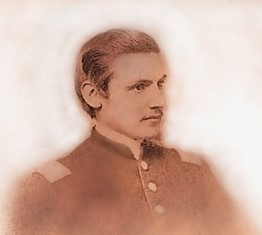
Joseph Penrose Ash

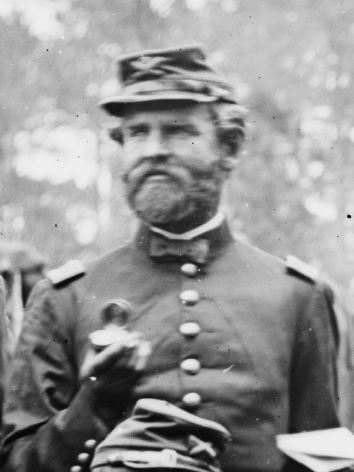
Henry Benson

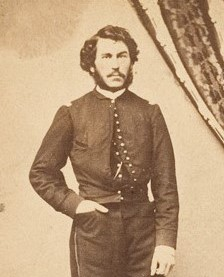
Haldimand Putnam

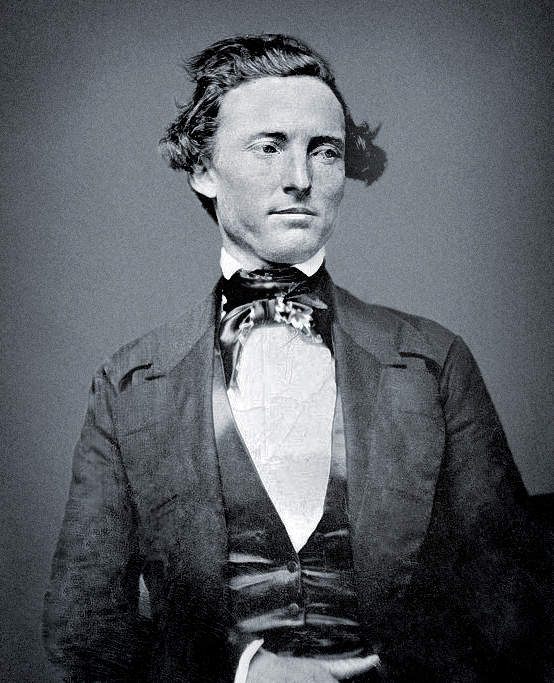
Samuel Hamilton Walker

John Milton Brannan

== State park ==
The Washington State Parks and Recreation Commission acquired most of Fort Worden on September 30, 1971, when the state closed the juvenile treatment center. The 433-acre (175 ha) Fort Worden State Park was opened on August 18, 1973. Today the 2.1 miles (3.4 km) of sandy beaches and high bluffs attract residents from around the region to the multi-use recreation facility.

The extensive system of large, abandoned artillery batteries are available for exploration (closed at dusk). The state park includes the Puget Sound Coast Artillery Museum, a balloon hangar which was used for observation balloons, three 3-inch anti-aircraft gun emplacements (no guns remain), and several restored quarters on Officers'/NCO Row available for vacation rentals. The Point Wilson Lighthouse is also located here.

The Commanding Officer's Quarters on Officers' Row has been restored to reflect the early 20th century Victorian period, and is open in the summer for tours.

The park is the home of the Port Townsend School of Woodworking, a fine woodworking school founded by Jim Tolpin, John Marckworth, and Tim Lawson.

The independent publisher of poetry, Copper Canyon Press, located permanently at Fort Worden in 1974.

The park also is the home of the Port Townsend Marine Science Center, whose natural history museum, hands-on tidepool exhibits and educational programs promote understanding about coastal ecosystems.

The 1982 film An Officer and a Gentleman was shot at Fort Worden, as well as the 2002 film The Ring.

Goddard College's Port Townsend campus hosts several of its program residencies at Fort Worden in the former base hospital building.

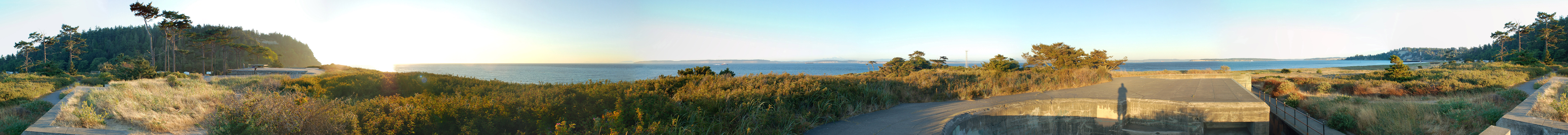
360° Panorama from Fort Worden State Park, Point Wilson on a sunny July evening at sunset. Photo taken from Battery Vicars, with Battery Kinzie visible nearby.

One notable feature of the park is the 2,000,000 gallon underground cistern, originally built to hold water for fire-fighting in the event that the fort was attacked and put to the torch. The cistern was drained in the 1950s when the fort was decommissioned, leaving an underground space more than 200 feet in diameter and 14 feet deep. This huge subterranean chamber has an acoustical reverberation time of around 45 seconds, and once attracted the interest of various musicians and recording artists, among them Wayne Horvitz, Pauline Oliveros, and Stuart Dempster.

As of 2014, the cistern is sealed shut and closed to all public access indefinitely.

== Military cemetery ==
A small military cemetery, maintained by the Public Works Directorate at Joint Base Lewis-McChord, is located at the south side of the state park.

== See also ==
- 14th Coast Artillery (United States)
