= McNutts Island, Nova Scotia =

McNutts Island
- Community
- Location of McNutts Island, Nova Scotia
- Coordinates: 43.646111°N 65.301389°W
- Country: Canada
- Province: Nova Scotia
- County: Shelburne
- Municipal district: Shelburne
- Time zone: UTC-4 (AST)
  - Summer (DST): UTC-3 (ADT)
- Area code: 902

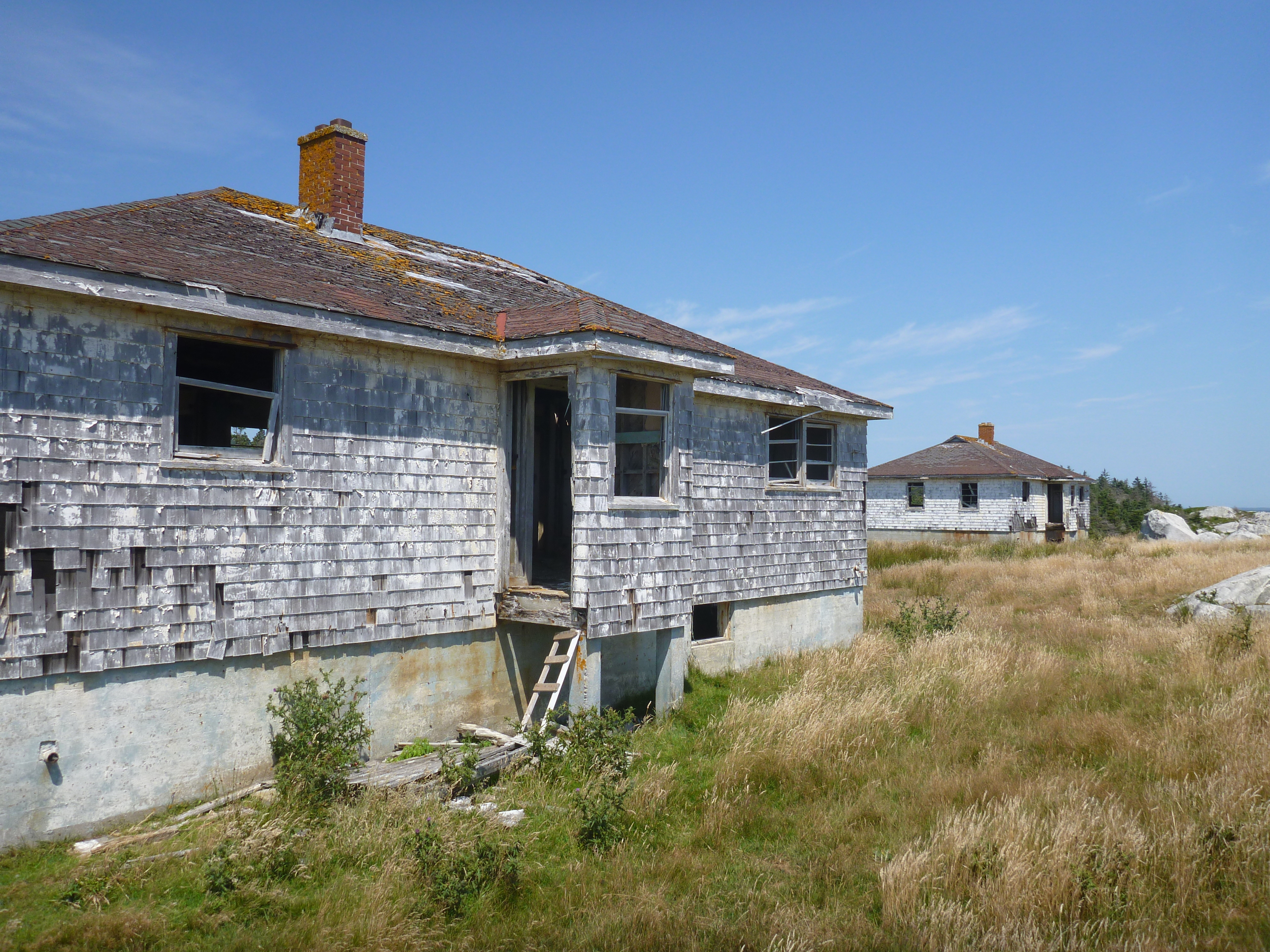

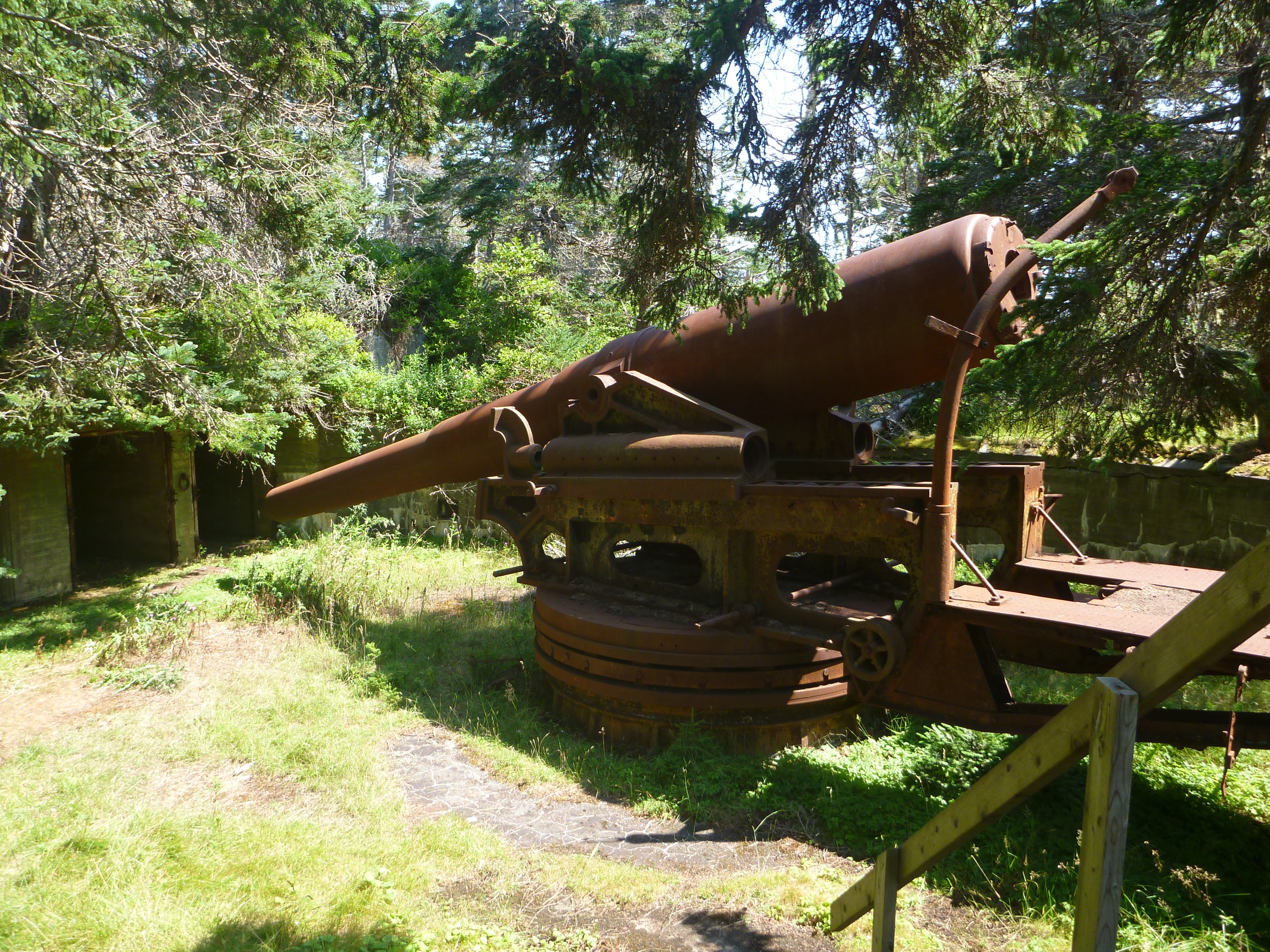
One of the M1888 10 inch coastal guns on McNutt's Island

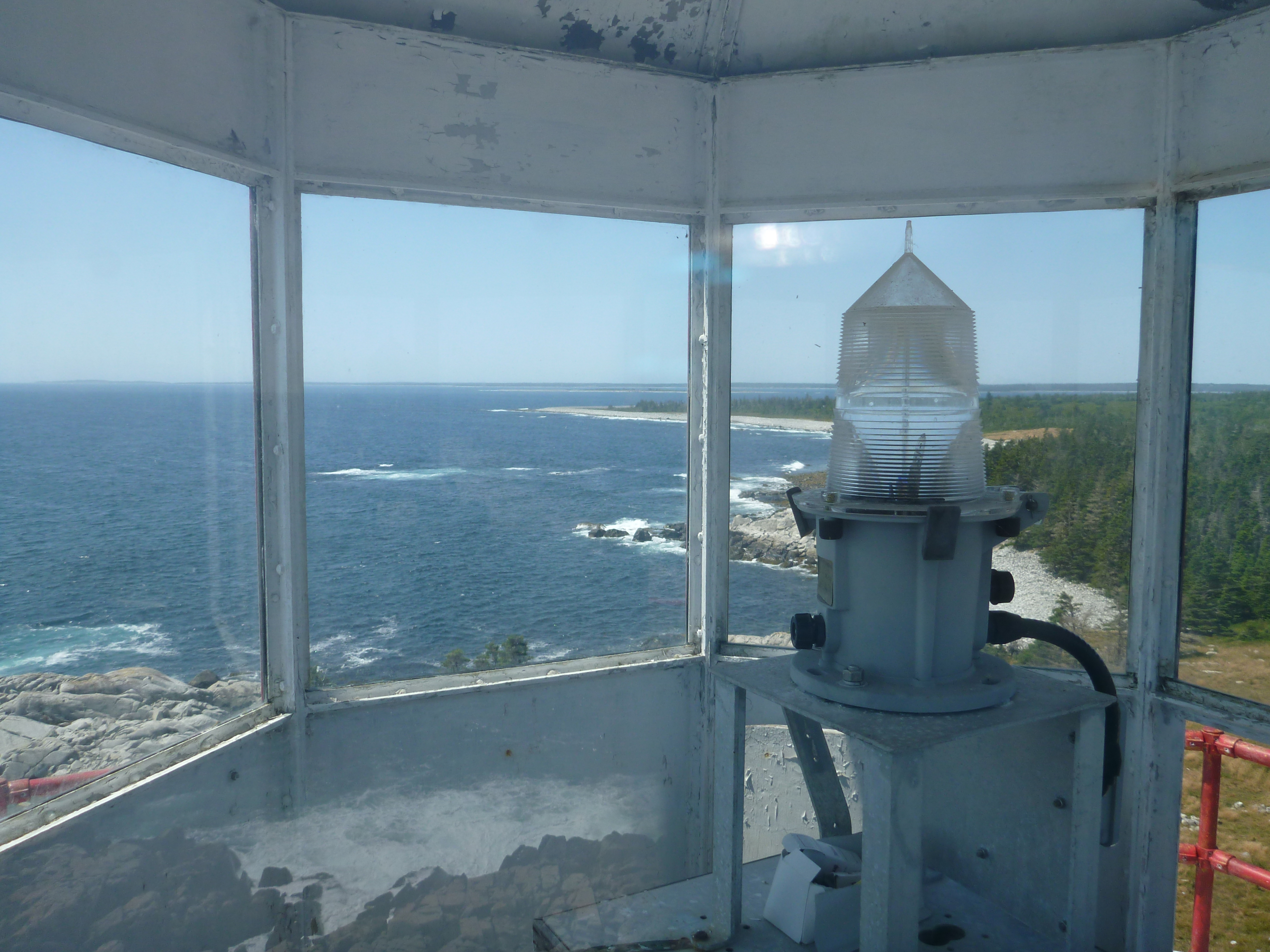
The lighthouse is no longer in use, but the view from the top is still as good as ever.

McNutts Island is a community in the Canadian province of Nova Scotia, located in the Shelburne municipal district of Shelburne County.

== History ==
The island was named after Col. Alexander McNutt, who lived here in the late 1760s.

During World War II, a battery of two 10 inch M1888 guns were built on the island. It was abandoned in 1945 after the war ended, but the guns remain in place until today. However, the island wasn't abandoned in 1945 because there were a few families who lived there during and after the war.

As of 2010, the island had two full time residents living in a restored fishing house, and sheep would graze on the island. In the summer the would eat grass and in the winter they substituted grass with seaweed.

== See also ==
- List of communities in Nova Scotia
