= 248th Coast Artillery (United States) =

248th Coast Artillery Regiment
- Active: 1923–1944
- Country: United States
- Branch: Army
- Type: Coast artillery
- Role: Harbor defense
- Size: Regiment
- Part of: Harbor Defenses of Puget Sound
- Garrison/HQ: Fort Worden
- Mottos: Facilime Princeps (Very easily, Prince)
- Mascot: Oozlefinch

The 248th Coast Artillery Regiment was a Coast Artillery Corps regiment in the Washington National Guard. Including its predecessor battalion, it garrisoned the Harbor Defenses of Puget Sound, Washington, from 1923 to 1944.

== History ==
Organized on 13 November 1923 in the Washington National Guard as the 1st Battalion, Coast Artillery Corps, consisting of three companies, and assigned to the Harbor Defenses of Puget Sound. Concurrently, the battalion headquarters was organized and federally recognized at Olympia, Washington. The battalion was redesignated on 1 March 1924 as the 1st Battalion (Provisional), 248th Artillery Regiment, Coast Artillery Corps, and further redesignated on 1 May 1924 as the 1st Battalion (Provisional), 248th Coast Artillery Regiment (Harbor Defense). It was relieved from the Harbor Defenses of Puget Sound on 1 October 1933 and assigned the General Headquarters Reserve. Concurrently, it was reorganized and redesignated as the 248th Coast Artillery Battalion. It was expanded and redesignated on 1 September 1935 as the 248th Coast Artillery Regiment (Harbor Defense) (Type B).

The regiment consisted only of the regimental Headquarters and Headquarters Battery and Batteries A, B, and C; the Headquarters and Headquarters Battery, 1st Battalion, and the entire 2nd Battalion was inactive. The 248th was reassigned to the Harbor Defenses of Puget Sound in 1938. The regiment, or elements thereof, was called up to perform the following state duties: riot control at an International Workers of the World strike at Aberdeen, Washington, in May 1922; riot control during the “hunger marches” at Olympia, Washington, 1–3 March 1933; riot control at a lumber workers strike at Aberdeen and Tacoma, Washington, 24 June–9 August 1935. The regiment conducted annual summer training at Fort Worden, Washington, from 1922–40. Reorganized on 1 January 1940 as a Type A regiment.

The remainder of the regiment was organized on 1 September 1940 by the activation of the Headquarters and Headquarters Battery, 1st Battalion, and the conversion and redesignation of the 2nd Battalion, 148th Field Artillery Regiment as the 2nd Battalion. It was inducted into federal service on 16 September 1940 at home stations and transferred to Fort Worden, Washington, arriving there on 23 September 1940, where it assumed the mission of manning batteries in the Harbor Defenses of Puget Sound. On 25 April 1944, the regiment moved to Camp Barkeley, Texas where it was inactivated on 8 May 1944.

== See also ==
- Seacoast defense in the United States
- United States Army Coast Artillery Corps
- Harbor Defense Command
