= Manus MacCloskey =

US Army general and CCC official (1874–1963)

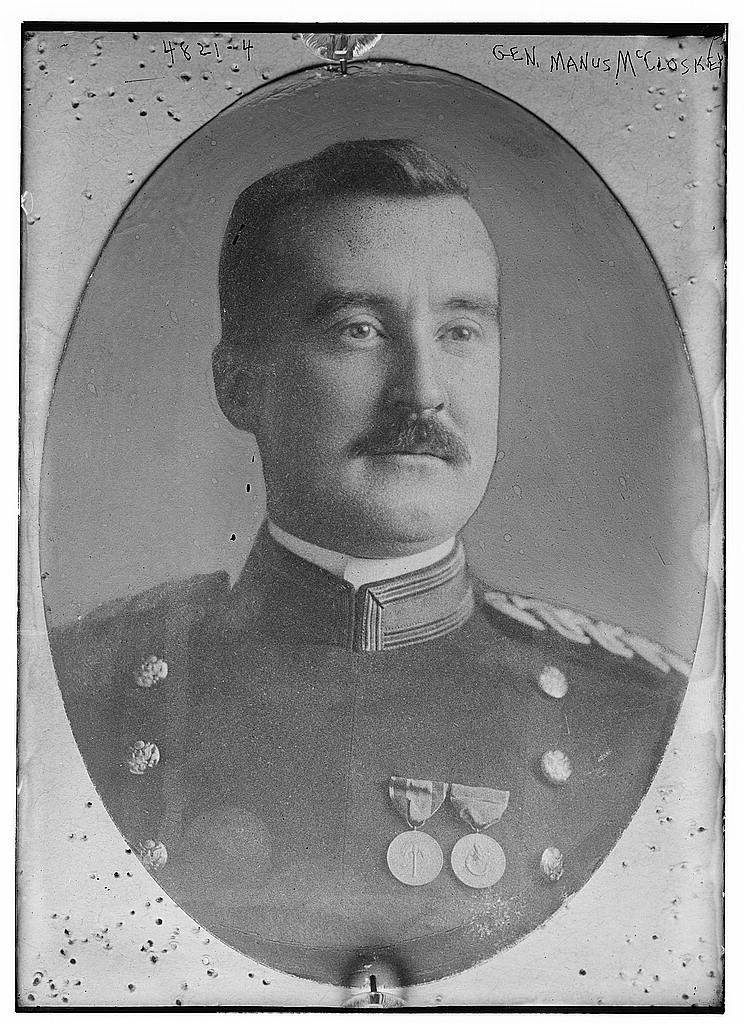
- McCloskey circa 1918
- Born: April 24, 1874; Pittsburgh, Pennsylvania, U.S.
- Died: May 11, 1963 (aged 89); Washington, DC, U.S.
- Burial place: Arlington National Cemetery, Arlington, Virginia, U.S.
- Alma mater: United States Military Academy (1898)
- Spouse: Sara Monro (m. 1901)
- Children: 2, including Monro MacCloskey
- Military career
- Allegiance: United States
- Branch: United States Army
- Service years: 1898–1938
- Rank: Brigadier General
- Service number: 0-260
- Units: 2nd Division; 77th Division
- Commands: 11th Field Artillery Regiment; 12th Field Artillery Regiment; 83rd Field Artillery Regiment; 152nd Field Artillery Brigade; 8th Field Artillery Brigade; 12th Infantry Brigade; 13th Field Artillery Brigade
- Conflicts: Philippine-American War; China Relief Expedition; World War I; Battle of Château-Thierry (1918); Battle of Belleau Wood; Battle of Soissons (1918); Battle of Saint-Mihiel; Meuse-Argonne Offensive
- Awards: Army Distinguished Service Medal; Silver Star with oak leaf cluster

Manus MacCloskey (April 24, 1874 – May 11, 1963) was a brigadier general in the United States Army. He served in the Philippines, participated in the China Relief Expedition, and commanded the 12th Field Artillery Regiment during World War I. After retiring from the military, he organized the Civilian Conservation Corps in North Carolina and later served as superintendent of Cook County Hospital in Chicago.

== Early life ==
He was born in Pittsburgh, Pennsylvania on April 24, 1874. MacCloskey graduated from the United States Military Academy in 1898.

== Start of career ==
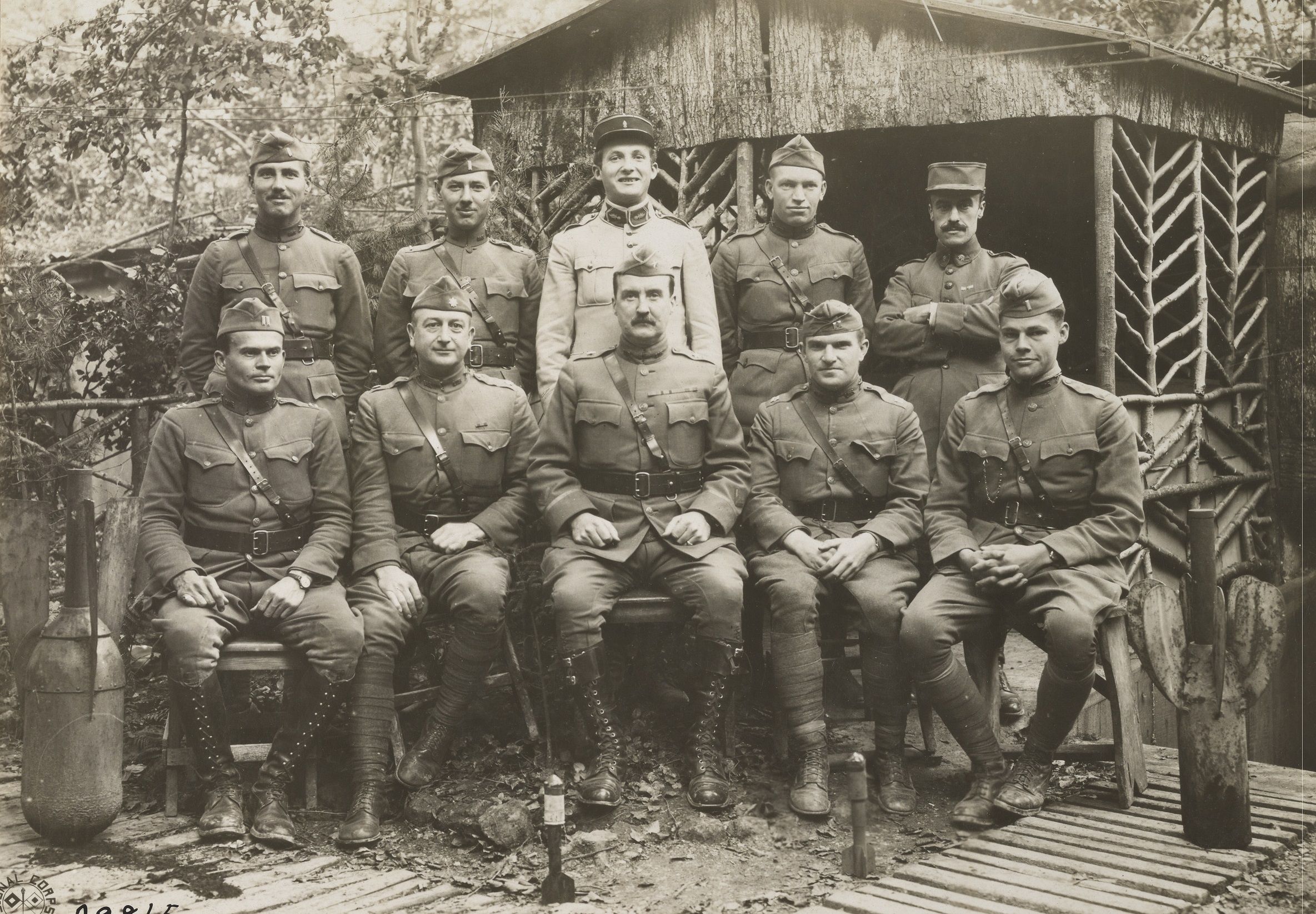
MacCloskey (center) with his staff in the Forest of Argonne in October 1918

After his commissioning, he joined the Fifth Field Artillery on April 26, 1898. In 1916, he commanded Fort Myer

He served in the Philippines and participated in the China Relief Expedition.

== Continued career ==
During World War I, he organized and commanded the 12th Field Artillery Regiment. MacCloskey fought in the Battle of Verdun, the Battle of Château-Thierry (1918), the Battle of Belleau Wood, and the Battle of Soissons (1918).

== Later career ==
From January 1921 to June 30, 1924, he served with the General staff at Headquarters, Sixth Corps Area. He later served at Fort Sheridan and Fort Bragg. He retired from military service on April 30, 1938.

== Civilian career ==
In 1933, he organized the Civilian Conservation Corps (CCC) in North Carolina. He served as superintendent of Cook County Hospital in Chicago from 1938 to 1947.

== Retirement and death ==
He died on May 11, 1963, in Washington, DC. He is buried at Arlington National Cemetery.

== Family ==
He married Sara Monro on August 14, 1901. They had two children: Monro MacCloskey, who attained the rank of brigadier general in the United States Air Force, and Sara, who was known as Sally.

== Awards and honors ==
Awards he received during his career include the Army Distinguished Service Medal, the citation for which reads:

The President of the United States of America, authorized by Act of Congress, July 9, 1918, takes pleasure in presenting the Army Distinguished Service Medal to Colonel (Field Artillery) Manus MacCloskey, United States Army, for exceptionally meritorious and distinguished services to the Government of the United States, in a duty of great responsibility during World War I. While in Command of the 12th Field Artillery during all its operations with the 2d Division, until 16 August 1918, Colonel MacCloskey displayed marked ability and efficiency. He especially distinguished himself during the operations of the 2d Division at the Bois-de-Belleau and Bouresches, when he commanded in addition to his own regiment, the 37th Field Artillery, French Army. By this service he contributed in no small measure to the success of the Infantry Brigade in these operations. Later, as Commanding General, 152d field Artillery Brigade, he rendered able support to the attacking Infantry of the 77th Division.

He also received the Silver Star with oak leaf cluster, and the Purple Heart with oak leaf cluster. His Silver Star citation reads:

By direction of the President, under the provisions of the act of Congress approved July 9, 1918 (Bul. No. 43, W.D., 1918), Brigadier General Manus MacClosky, United States Army, is cited by the Commanding General, American Expeditionary Forces, for gallantry in action and a silver star may be placed upon the ribbon of the Victory Medals awarded him. Brigadier General MacClosky distinguished himself by gallantry in action while serving with the American Expeditionary Forces, in action at Vierzy, France, 19 July 1918, in making a personal reconnaissance under intense artillery and machine gun fire, in order to regulate the fire of his artillery.

He also received the Order of the Crown of Italy, rank Officer for his World War I service.

== Effective dates of promotion ==
MacCloskey's effective dates of promotion were:

Second Lieutenant, April 26, 1898
First Lieutenant, August 15, 1900
Captain, September 23, 1901
Major, March 16, 1913
Lieutenant Colonel, July 26, 1916
Colonel, May 15, 1917
Brigadier General (temporary), August 8, 1918
Colonel, July 15, 1919 (reduced from temporary brigadier general)
Brigadier General, September 1, 1930
Brigadier General (retired), April 30, 1938

== Legacy ==
In 1977, MacCloskey's personal papers were donated to the University of Pittsburgh archives by Monro MacCloskey.
