= Point Partridge =

Westernmost point of Whidbey Island, Washington (state), United States

Coordinates: 48°13′29″N 122°46′13″W

Point Partridge (Lushootseed: x̌ʷuk̓q̓ʷqs) is the most westerly point of Whidbey Island, the largest island in Puget Sound. The point lies north of the Fort Ebey military reservation and south of West Beach. The primary importance of Point Partridge is as the northern and eastern reference point for the dividing line between Puget Sound and the Strait of Juan de Fuca. The other reference is Point Wilson.

In Lushootseed, the name of the point is x̌ʷuk̓q̓ʷqs, meaning "muddy point." The origin of the English name is not known for certain. According to G.H. Anderson, the point was named by George Vancouver in 1792, to honor the family of Vancouver's sister-in-law, Martha Partridge, the daughter of Henry Partridge. The Spanish explorer Manuel Quimper had named the point two years before Vancouver, calling it "Menendez".
