= Diamond Point =

Diamond Point may refer to:

- Diamond Point, Washington, an unincorporated community in Clallam County, Washington
  - Diamond Point Airport
- Diamond Point, New York, a hamlet in Warren County, New York
- Diamond Point (artist), Coast Salish artist

== See also ==
- Diamond Point School, a historic one-room school house in Nowata County, Oklahoma
