= Quimper (disambiguation) =

Quimper may refer to:

- Arrondissement of Quimper, an arrondissement in the department of Finistère, France
  - Quimper, Finistère, a commune in that arrondissement
    - Quimper faience, a style of faience pottery produced in a factory near Quimper, in France
- Manuel Quimper, a Peruvian-born Spanish explorer, cartographer, naval officer, and colonial official
  - Quimper Peninsula, narrow peninsula in northwestern Washington state named after the explorer Manuel Quimper
