= Point Wilson =

Point on the Quimper Peninsula, Washington, U.S.

Coordinates: 48°8′38″N 122°45′15″W

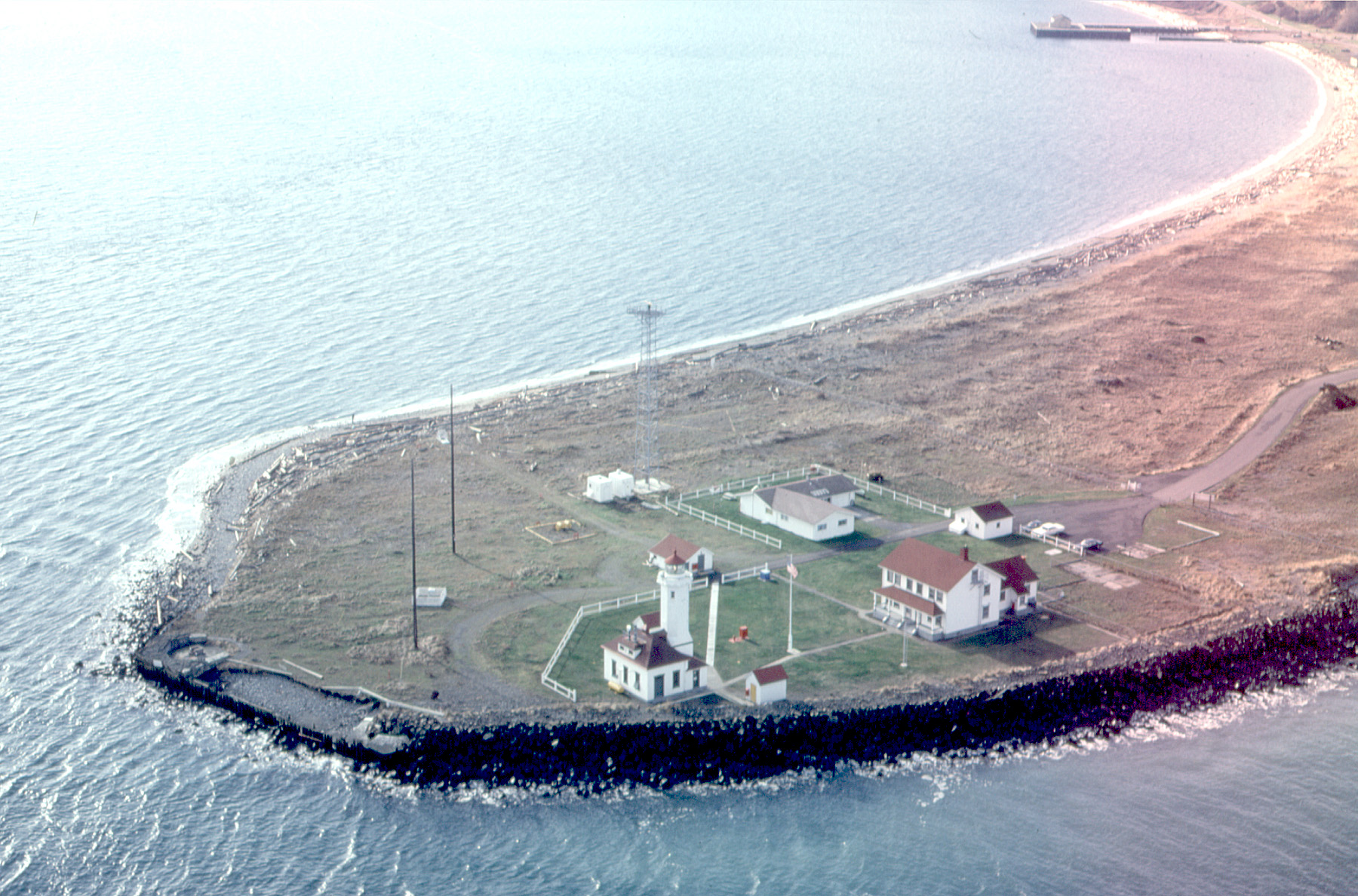
Point Wilson and the Point Wilson Lighthouse

Point Wilson is at the end of the Quimper Peninsula, a northeast extension of the Olympic Peninsula and the northeasternmost point of Jefferson County, Washington, United States, approximately two miles north of the Port Townsend business district.

This low, broad sand-spit, extends over a half-mile into the water and marks the entrance to Admiralty Inlet from the Strait of Juan de Fuca. Here, the main shipping channel narrows and makes a sharp turn to the south into Puget Sound.

Nearby shoals, heavy rip-tides, and persistent fogs influenced the placing of a lighthouse on Point Wilson in 1879. In 1913, the present Point Wilson Lighthouse was built by the United States Lighthouse Service. The point is also the site of a meteorological station.

The Chimakum Indians named this point Kam-kam-ho and the S'Klallam Indians called it Kam-Kum. Point Wilson was discovered by Europeans on July 5, 1790 by Juan Carrasco and Manuel Quimper. Captain George Vancouver of the Royal Navy named Point Wilson on June 5, 1792, in honor of a colleague, Captain George Wilson.
