= Diamond Point, Washington =

Unincorporated community in Washington, United States

- Unincorporated community
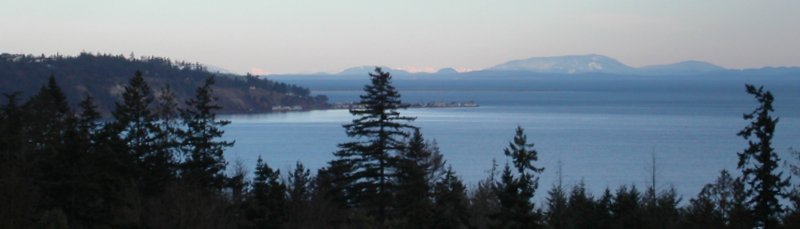
- Diamond Point, seen from Gardiner

- Location within Washington (state)
- Coordinates: 48°05′38″N 122°54′53″W
- Country: United States
- State: Washington
- County: Clallam
- Elevation: 0 ft (0 m)
- Time zone: UTC-8 (Pacific (PST))
  - Summer (DST): UTC-7 (PDT)
- ZIP code: 98382
- GNIS feature ID: 1518759

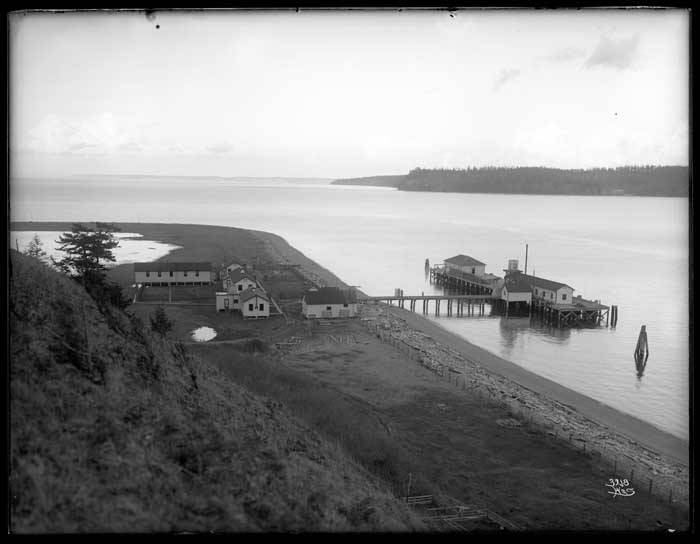
The quarantine station, photographed 1905

Diamond Point is an unincorporated community in Clallam County, Washington, United States, located on the Miller Peninsula. Diamond Point is at the northwestern corner of Discovery Bay, and looks north to Protection Island. While some homes are located along the water on the point itself, most homes are located on the bluffs and plateau above Discovery Bay and the Strait of Juan de Fuca.

Diamond Point is mostly residential and is serviced by Diamond Point Airport. Some pilots access the airport by taxiing their aircraft on and across county roads adjacent to the airport.

Miller Peninsula State Park is located on all landward sides of the community. This park has miles of hiking trails and is accessible from the community or from a number of nearby trailheads.

== History ==
Klallam Indians had a village with a stockade at the point when the first European explorers entered the region. A quarantine station for ships coming into the Puget Sound from outside the United States was built at Diamond Point in the late 1880s. There are still old relics of Diamond Point's past visible, including two crumbling docks, a spray house, a utility building, a hospital, and a nurses' quarters. The quarantine station remained active until 1934. The hospital and nurses' quarters are now private residences.

The area was opened up to residential development in the late 1950s and within 10 years the Diamond Point Land Company and the Sunshine Acres development had much of the land plotted and sold.
