= Discovery Bay, Washington =

Community in Jefferson County, Washington

- Unincorporated community
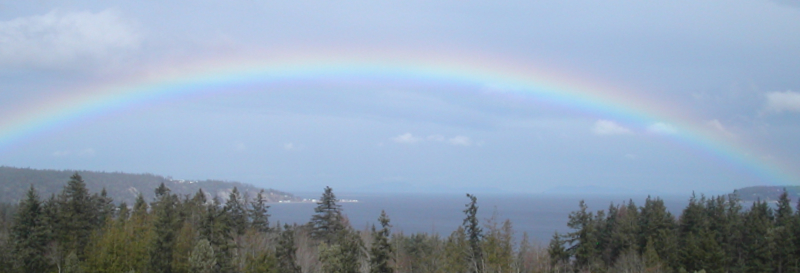
- Discovery Bay as seen from Gardiner, Washington, with Diamond Point visible on the left

- Location within Washington (state) Location within the United States
- Coordinates: 47°59′24″N 122°53′31″W
- Country: United States
- State: Washington
- County: Jefferson
- Elevation: 43 ft (13 m)
- Time zone: UTC-8 (Pacific (PST))
  - Summer (DST): UTC-7 (PDT)
- Area code(s): 360, 564
- GNIS feature ID: 1530336

Discovery Bay is an unincorporated community in Jefferson County, Washington. The community of Discovery Bay is an area near the intersection of U.S. Route 101 and State Route 20, at the foot of Discovery Bay – roughly midway between the larger communities of Port Townsend to the northeast and Sequim to the northwest. It is a mix of residential areas and commercial enterprises, including crabbing, oystering, clamming, timbering, security training and gravel extraction. A few restaurants and stores on US 101 near SR 20 primarily serve drivers and truckers along US 101.

Discovery Bay is the current name generally associated with the area. Its use for the community, as opposed to the bay itself, is relatively recent. The original communities in the area, primarily mill towns that waxed and waned along with the local timber industry, had different names:

- Fairmont is a group of residences at the southeast corner of the bay, off SR 20 just northeast of US 101.
- Discovery Junction is an abandoned railroad junction near Fairmont.
- Uncas is an old mill community to the southwest of Fairmont, on the south side of US 101.
- Fort Discovery is the original location of Capt. Vancouver's camp.
- Maynard is an old mill community to the north of Uncas, along US 101 at the southwest corner of the bay. An abandoned sawmill just to the east of US 101 is a well-known remnant of this community. The mill has often been incorrectly identified as the 1858 Port Discovery Mill (see Port Discovery, below). It was, in fact, the Maynard Mill.

These names often appear on maps and persist in local road names. The mill communities no longer have the population or visibility they enjoyed when the mills were operating, making these hamlets primarily matters of local historical interest. However, changing demographics and rising property values are leading to redevelopment of this area, and breathing new life into older names.

South Discovery now constitutes the entirety of the area around Discovery Bay, especially the area between Port Discovery and Port Townsend. The South Discovery voting precinct includes areas away from Discovery Bay, as well.

Several nearby place names are also prominent in Discovery Bay history:

- Eaglemount is an area on the hills to the south of Discovery Bay, on the east of US 101 above high bluffs over Discovery Bay. (Eaglemount is sometimes depicted as a location on SR 20, but in fact it is reached by turning south on Eaglemount Road from SR20.)
- Port Discovery is the location of George Vancouver's 1792 visit to Discovery Bay. Many sources incorrectly identify the current Discovery Bay community as the location of Port Discovery; however, Port Discovery was several miles to the north, at Mill Point on the west side of the bay. The site is along US 101, near today's Broders Road.

There are several other communities located on or near the shores of Discovery Bay. Port Townsend occupies the northern end of the Quimper Peninsula, 5 miles (8 km) east of the northeast corner of the bay. The downtown area of Port Townsend, a famous seaport (once the major port of the region, before the rise of Seattle), is on the opposite side of the peninsula. Cape George is located on high bluffs at the northeast entrance of the bay; Beckett Point is a shoreline community a mile south. Another shoreline community, Adelma Beach is halfway down the bay. Gardiner is an unincorporated community several miles to the west along US 101, established by Herbert Gardner in the late 19th century. Diamond Point is located at the northwest mouth of the bay, opposite Protection Island, which once hosted a government quarantine station.

== History ==
Native people – the Klallam (locally: S'Klallam) – have occupied the lands around the Strait of Juan de Fuca for millennia, including locations on Discovery Bay. Most native populations on the Olympic Peninsula were relocated to reservations during the 19th and early 20th centuries, leaving only scattered individuals of native descent still residing on the bay.

In 1792, George Vancouver's exploration of the area provided names for Discovery Bay and Port Discovery. A landing party put ashore along the west shore of the bay near what is now Contractor's Point to fill water barrels from the creek there. Today, a sign alongside Highway 101 above the site of the landing commemorates the event.

In 1858, the S. L. Mastick Company of San Francisco established the Port Discovery Mill on the western shore of the bay, at what is now Mill Point. The old growth timber on the steep hillsides above the mill were felled, slid down to the sawmill, milled into lumber and loaded from the wharf to ships for other ports. A village grew around the mill to house its employees. The peak population of the community, in the late 19th century, was in the hundreds. Port Discovery remained an important coastal port well into the 20th century, and was visited by many Pacific Ocean vessels.

Another major mill community was established at the foot of the bay, where the town of Maynard grew. The Maynard mill continued in operation until the 1970s, and was responsible for the several nearby small communities mentioned above. The abandoned sawmill was a popular sight for tourists and appears in many nostalgic area photographs and paintings. It deteriorated rapidly during storms in 2005–2006, and as of 2007 had been slated for removal, as part of a habitat restoration effort.
