= Port Discovery, Washington =

Unincorporated community in Washington, United States

- Unincorporated community
- Location within Washington (state) Location within the United States
- Coordinates: 48°00′55″N 122°51′43″W
- Country: United States
- State: Washington
- County: Jefferson
- Elevation: 115 ft (35 m)
- Time zone: UTC-8 (Pacific (PST))
  - Summer (DST): UTC-7 (PDT)
- GNIS feature ID: 1524587

Port Discovery, Washington is the name of a historically significant community in Jefferson County, Washington that was located on Discovery Bay for roughly a hundred years; it disappeared in the late 20th century, with the collapse of the local timber industry.

== The bay ==
Discovery Bay was first visited by Europeans in 1790, during the expedition of Manuel Quimper in the Princesa Real, with Juan Carrasco as pilot. They gave it the name Puerto de Quadra, after Juan Francisco de la Bodega y Quadra, their commander at San Blas. In 1791 Francisco de Eliza used Port Discovery as his base of operations for further explorations.

== History ==
The name Port Discovery was given by George Vancouver in his 1792 visit to the Strait of Juan de Fuca, and honors his ship the Discovery. Vancouver's landing place was apparently at what was later called Carr Point (also Contractors Point).

In the 19th century, Port Discovery became an important coastal community, centered on a large sawmill that was established in 1858. The settlement called Port Discovery was located at what now is called Mill Point, on the west shore of the bay, to the east of U.S. Highway 101 at what is now Broders Road. This spot is several miles north of the current settlements at the foot of Discovery Bay.

Port Discovery was a regular port of call for ships traversing the Pacific until the mid 20th century, and in particular for many U.S. ships involved in World War II, such as USS Washington, USS Lassen, and USS Las Vegas Victory. The wreck of War Hawk, a clipper ship which burned and sank in 1883, is a popular dive site in the bay, near Mill Point.

The U.S. Federal Census of 1860 designated Port Discovery as one of three enumeration districts in Jefferson County. The indigenous people were not counted for this census. The total population was 70, and all but one were males between the ages of 20 and 52 years old. The one female was married to a cook, and the only non-white person counted was an African-American male cook. Two-thirds of the population were American-born, all of which had migrated west from other states. Of the third that were foreign-born, all but one were from England, Ireland, Wales, or Canada. The exception was born in Sweden.

The town at Mill Point dwindled after the closing of the sawmill, and vanished after the later collapse of the local timber industry. Only a couple of houses and an old pier remain at the site, which is private property.

Until around 2008, the prominent remains of another famous sawmill were visible farther down the shore from Mill Point, near what was Maynard, Washington, at the foot of the bay. The romantic, derelict building was adjacent to Highway 101, and was thus seen by every passing motorist; it was one of the most-photographed sites in the area for decades. Many such photos are mislabeled as the Port Discovery mill, although the Maynard mill was built later. By 2010, the building's vestiges were removed, in efforts to restore Discovery Bay salmon and shellfish habitat.
