= Dabob, Washington =

Unincorporated community in Washington, United States

- Unincorporated community
- Location within Washington (state) Location within the United States
- Coordinates: 47°50′49.33″N 122°48′15.59″W
- Country: United States
- State: Washington
- County: Jefferson
- Time zone: UTC-8 (Pacific (PST))
  - Summer (DST): UTC-7 (PDT)
- Area code(s): 360, 564
- GNIS feature ID: 1518445

Dabob is an unincorporated community in Jefferson County, in the U.S. state of Washington.

== History ==
A post office called Dabob was established in 1911, and remained in operation until 1955.
