= Gardiner, Washington =

Unincorporated community in Washington, United States

- Unincorporated community
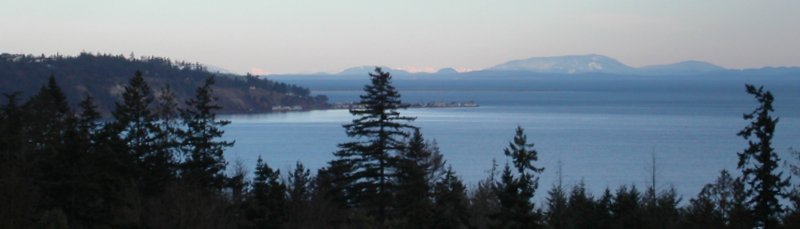
- Looking north from Gardiner

- Location within Washington (state) Location within the United States
- Coordinates: 48°02′59″N 122°54′57″W
- Country: United States
- State: Washington
- County: Jefferson
- Elevation: 210 ft (64 m)
- Time zone: UTC-8 (Pacific (PST))
  - Summer (DST): UTC-7 (PDT)
- Area code(s): 360, 564
- GNIS feature ID: 1519892

Gardiner is an unincorporated community in Jefferson County, Washington, United States. Additionally, part of Clallam County, located along the Jefferson County line adjacent to Gardiner is often referred to as being part of Gardiner.

== History ==
Timber in the area was originally cleared in the late 19th century, as was much of Discovery Bay, and was planted with fruit trees – primarily apples and pears. Gardiner took the name of the original farmer, Herbert Gardner. The spelling was eventually changed to its current form, due to a conflict with another Gardner, Washington; this was needed to enable mail delivery. Gardiner lost its post office in the 1990s and residents were given mailing addresses in Sequim, Washington.

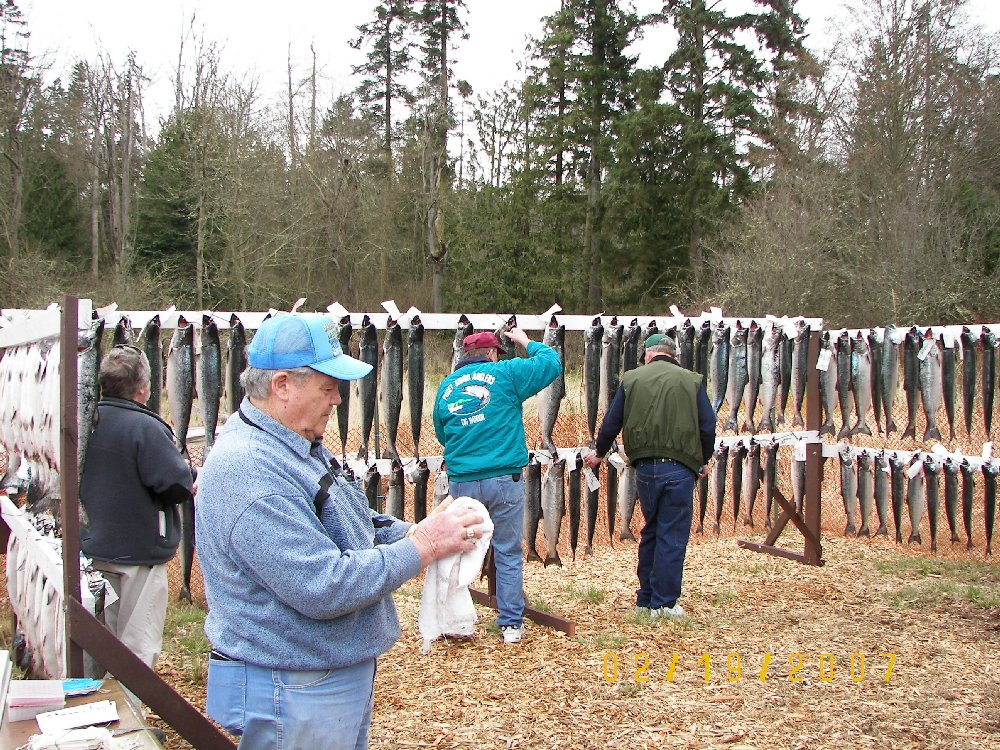
Annual Salmon Derby

== Geography ==
Gardiner is located on the Miller Peninsula, at the northern coast of the Olympic Peninsula on Discovery Bay, which enters the Strait of Juan de Fuca. Gardiner is primarily a rural-residential community, with mostly five- and 20-acre (81,000 m^{2}) parcels, plus several large landholders. Gardiner also has a few retail establishments, a community center, and a church, all located on U.S. Route 101. There is still some farming, lumbering, and fishing, but the area is following the Jefferson County trend away from agriculture, as old homesteads and family farms get subdivided into residences.

The community has roughly 300 people, and is located 12 miles (19 km) east of Sequim, just north of U.S. Route 101.

== Parks and recreation ==
Gardiner has a public boat ramp that provides access to Discovery Bay; the ramp is maintained by the Port of Port Townsend. Popular salmon fishing derbies are held here each February; in the 2011 event, 760 ticket holders fished in an area spanning 500 square miles.
