= Cape George, Washington =

Unincorporated community in Washington, United States

- Unincorporated community
- Location within Washington (state) Location within the United States
- Coordinates: 48°5′53″N 122°52′42″W
- Country: United States
- State: Washington
- County: Jefferson
- Time zone: UTC-8 (Pacific (PST))
  - Summer (DST): UTC-7 (PDT)
- Area code(s): 360, 564

Cape George is an homeowners association on the Olympic Peninsula in Washington state. It lies along the eastern shore of Discovery Bay on the western coast of the Quimper Peninsula in eastern Jefferson County. It is located four miles south of Port Townsend.
