= Miller Peninsula =

Peninsula in Washington state, United States

Coordinates: 48°1′14″N 122°55′55″W

The Miller Peninsula is a small peninsula in Clallam County, Washington and Jefferson County, Washington surrounded by Discovery Bay on the east, the Strait of Juan de Fuca to the north, and Sequim Bay to the west. Small residential communities on the peninsula include Blyn, at the southwest corner; Diamond Point, on the northeast corner; Gardiner, midway down the eastern shore; and Discovery Bay at the foot. The north side of the peninsula is home to Miller Peninsula State Park, which has 2,884 acres (1,167 ha) of public land that is mostly undeveloped.
