= Leland, Washington =

Unincorporated community in Washington, United States

- Unincorporated community
- Location within Washington (state) Location within the United States
- Coordinates: 47°53′30″N 122°53′12″W
- Country: United States
- State: Washington
- County: Jefferson
- Elevation: 207 ft (63 m)
- Time zone: UTC-8 (Pacific (PST))
  - Summer (DST): UTC-7 (PDT)
- Area code(s): 360, 564
- GNIS feature ID: 1522001

Leland is an unincorporated community in Jefferson County, in the U.S. state of Washington.

== History ==
A post office called Leland was established in 1881, and remained in operation until 1959. The community's name was phonetically derived from the first letters of each of the names of one Laura E. Andrews, an early settler.
