= Beckett Point, Washington =

Sand spit in Washington, US

Beckett Point
- Spit
- Location within Washington (state)
- Coordinates: 48°04′35″N 122°53′26″W
- Water bodies: Discovery Bay
- Etymology: Possible crew member of Vancouver Expedition
- Elevation: 0.91 m (3 ft)
- GNIS feature ID: 1516356

Beckett Point is a small sand spit jutting out into northeastern Discovery Bay, about ten miles from the city of Port Townsend in Jefferson County, Washington, United States. The Point is owned by the Beckett Point Fisherman's Club, which leases out approximately 100 homes. Many of the families have lived there for several generations, fishing salmon, crab, and shrimp.

Home to approximately 81 species of plants, the point contains a rare remnant of the region's original prairie ecosystem.

== History ==
Beckett Point was named by George Vancouver in 1792. Vancouver also named Discovery Bay, Washington for his ship, Puget Sound and Whidbey Island for crew members and Vancouver Island for himself. Many other places in the Pacific Northwest are named by him and his crew. It is likely that someone named "Beckett" was part of his crew.

Beckett Point Fisherman's Club has owned Beckett Point since 1939. At the outset, the community had 22 homes. It was originally built as a summer colony, although many people now live there year-round.
