= Diamond Point Airport =

- IATA: none; ICAO: none; FAA LID: 2WA1

Summary
- Airport type: Private
- Owner/Operator: Diamond Point Airport Association, Inc.
- Opened: August 1970
- Elevation AMSL: 262 ft (80 m)
- Coordinates: 48°05′33″N 122°55′43″W
- Website: 2wa1.com

Map
- Location of the airport in Washington State

Runways
Direction	Length		Surface
Direction	ft	m	Surface
11/29	2,335x24	712 × 7	Asphalt

Statistics (2015)
- Aircraft at location: Aircraft based on the field: 32; Single engine airplanes: 30; Ultralights: 2

Diamond Point Airport is a private community airport located on the northeast corner of Miller Peninsula in Clallam County, Washington, 8 mi (13 km) east of Sequim. It opened in August 1965.

Runway 11/29 is paved (asphalt) and has a length of 2,335 ft × 24 ft (712 m × 7 m), with a grass strip on the north side. Traffic pattern is to the north over the water. Runway lighting is on from dusk to dawn. Deer on the runway are common.

See 2WA1.org for airport information, procedures, and photos.
