= Diamond Point (artist) =

Musqueam artist in Canada

Diamond Point is a contemporary Coast Salish artist and member of the Musqueam Indian Band.

== Biography ==
Point grew up on the Musqueam reserve south of the University of British Columbia's Vancouver campus. Her last name, Point, comes from the colonial naming practices of places like Point Gray and Garry Point. Musqueam families like the Point family have been responsible for the oversight of these areas.

== Art practice ==
Point's art practice encompasses graphic design, illustration, site specific installations, and sculptural work. Her work has been installed in several public art projects across the lower mainland, most notably in Vancouver and Richmond, both of which occupy Musqueam territory. Her work often focuses on Indigenous identity, heritage, and relationships between communities – whether different First Nations, First Nations and settler, or other iterations.

Her work, wəɬ m̓i ct q̓pəθət tə ɬniməɬ, installed on UBC Campus from the Reconciliation Pole to the Canadian flag on the rose garden plaza, deals explicitly with relationships and protocols between different communities. Taking inspiration from the annual Coast Salish Canoe Journeys, the work depicts a series of paddles being raised as canoers ask permission to come ashore. Fraser River Families highlights the importance of salmon to Musqueam, and explores familial links between Musqueam communities and fishing practices ranging from UBC campus to Richmond and Steveston. Her designs were also selected for the Totem Park logos for three houses at the University of British Columbia residence that carry Musqueam names: həm̓ləsəm̓, q̓ələχən, and c̓əsnaʔəm.

In addition to these public projects, her work has been shown at the Museum of Anthropology in the Claiming Space: Voices of Urban Aboriginal Youth and at the Morris and Helen Belkin Art Gallery in Soundings: An Exhibition in Five Parts.
