= Juan Carrasco (explorer) =

Spanish naval officer, explorer, and navigator

Juan Carrasco was a Spanish naval officer, explorer, and navigator. He is remembered mainly for his work in the Pacific Northwest during the late 18th century. He was second in command of the 1791 voyage of José María Narváez, the first European exploration of the Strait of Georgia.

Many details about Carrasco's life are unknown. He was educated at the Academy of San Telmo in Spain, sometime between 1775 and 1780. Under the command of Francisco Antonio Mourelle he served in the Philippines and then, in 1784, traveled to the Pacific Northwest.

== 1790 voyage under Quimper ==
In 1790 Carrasco served as a pilot on Princesa Real, under the command of Manuel Quimper. Also on board was the pilot Gonzalo López de Haro. Dispatched by Francisco de Eliza from the Spanish post at Nootka Sound, with orders to explore the Strait of Juan de Fuca, the ship set sail on May 31, 1790. They rapidly passed the furthest point of previous exploration, which had only penetrated the westernmost part. They spent several days anchored in Sooke Basin, a deep bay on Vancouver Island. After leaving Sooke, the voyage continued east, passing between Race Rocks and Vancouver Island and anchoring near present-day Esquimalt, at the shoreline today called Royal Roads. Quimper named Royal Roads Rada de Eliza ("Rada" meaning roadstead).

On July 4, 1790, the Spanish left Esquimalt and crossed to the south side of the Strait of Juan de Fuca, anchoring near Dungeness Spit. The ship Princesa Real remained at anchor while boats were used to explore the eastern end of the Strait and the maze of islands and channels they found there. In this manner the Spanish reached the vicinity of Admiralty Inlet, the entrance to Puget Sound, and noted a larger channel leading north (today called Rosario Strait). They also found Deception Pass, which was named Boca de Flon. The expedition had limited resources and time. Quimper decided not to enter these channels but instead to explore the area near Dungeness Spit more thoroughly. Protection Island was found and given the name Isla de Carrasco, in honor of Juan Carrasco. Today's Port Discovery was entered and named Puerto de Quadra, for Juan Francisco de la Bodega y Quadra, the commander of Spanish naval operations in the North Pacific, based at San Blas

In mid-July Quimper consulted with his pilots, Carrasco and Haro, as to whether they should conduct further explorations and risk a difficult return to Nootka, or return immediately. The decision was made to return. On the way another large channel leading north was found and named after the pilot Haro. It is still known as Haro Strait today, and is the route of the international boundary between the Strait of Juan de Fuca and the Strait of Georgia. While anchored at Royal Roads a party was sent ashore for water, in the process finding Esquimalt Harbour. Quimper named the harbour Cordova after a high official of the Spanish navy. Princesa Real was the first European ship to enter Esquimalt Harbour. The expedition then crossed to the southern side of the Strait of Juan de Fuca and sailed west along the coast, reaching Neah Bay by August.

While in the Strait of Juan de Fuca, Quimper performed several formal ceremonies claiming Spanish possession of the region, at Sooke, Royal Roads near Esquimalt, Dungeness Spit, and Neah Bay.

At Cape Flattery Quimper led the Princesa Real north to Nootka Sound. They reached Nootka by August 10 but were unable to enter due to contrary winds and fog. After several failed attempts, Quimper consulted with Carrasco and Haro and decided to sail south to Monterey, California. They arrived at Monterey on September 1, 1790. Another Spanish ship, the San Carlos soon arrived, sailing south from Alaska. The two ships sailed together to San Blas, Mexico, arriving on November 13, 1790.

== 1791 voyage under Eliza ==
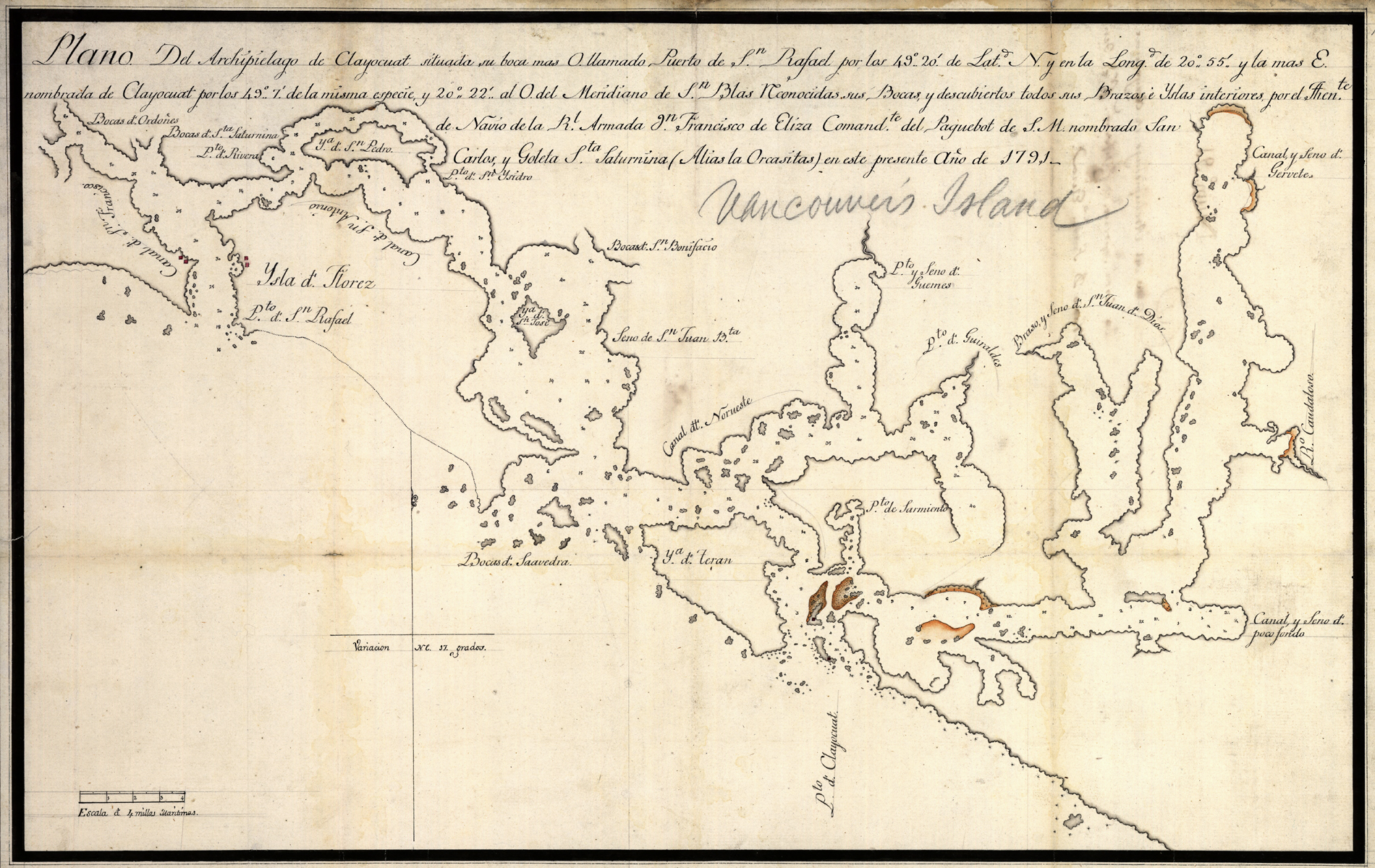
Spanish map of Clayoquot Sound made during the 1791 exploration voyage of Francisco de Eliza

In 1791 Carrasco took part in an exploratory expedition led by Ship Lieutenant Francisco de Eliza, then the new commandant at Nootka Sound. Two ships were used, the San Carlos, under Eliza, and the smaller schooner Santa Saturnina. Carrasco served as a pilot on the Santa Saturnina, at first as second-in-command under José María Narváez and later as the schooner's commander. The ships left Nootka Sound on May 4, 1791. The Santa Saturnina was 36 ft (11 m) long, with a beam of 12 ft (3.7 m), and a draft of 5 ft (1.5 m), and was equipped with eight oars.

After exploring Clayoquot Sound for about two weeks, the San Carlos sailed into the Strait of Juan de Fuca to Esquimalt. The Santa Saturnina spent several weeks exploring Barkley Sound, which was named Boca de Carrasco in honor of Juan Carrasco. The two ships rejoined at Esquimalt on June 14, 1791.

Eliza instructed pilot Juan Pantoja y Arriaga to explore Haro Strait with the Santa Saturnina and a longboat. They entered the strait on June 14 and rapidly passed between Vancouver Island and San Juan Island. On June 15 they turned northeast and passed along the shores of Pender Island and Saturna Island before entering the open water of the Strait of Georgia, which the Spanish named Canal de Nuestra Señora del Rosario. The party sailed east and soon reached the vicinity of Lummi Island at the northern end of Rosario Strait. From there the party returned to Esquimalt the way they had come, bringing word of the Strait of Georgia to Eliza.

Eliza's base of operations was then shifted to the south side of the Strait of Juan de Fuca at Puerto de Quadra (Port Discovery). The San Carlos remained anchored there while the Santa Saturnina, under Narváez, set out to explore Rosario Strait. Carrasco was Narváez's pilot, second in command. They set out on July 1, 1791. Quickly passing through Rosario Strait they sailed north into the Strait of Georgia to Point Roberts, which they thought was an island and named Isla de Zepeda. Continuing north they spotted Point Grey and Point Atkinson, then sailed a short distance into Burrard Inlet near present-day Vancouver, British Columbia.

The Santa Saturnina continued north to Texada Island, Hornby Island, and Denman Island. They also found Nanaimo Harbour and named it Bocas de Winthuysen. Sailing along Galiano Island and Valdes Island they noted Porlier Pass and gave it its present (Anglicized) name.

During the exploration of the Strait of Georgia the crew of the Santa Santurnina noted copious amounts of fresh water and correctly deduced that the mouth of a large river lay nearby. It was the Fraser River, but the party was unable to determine its location. A great number of whales were seen in the Strait, which led Eliza to later suggest, correctly, a second connection to the ocean. Further, Eliza came to suspect, again correctly, that Nootka Sound was not on the mainland, but rather on an island.

The Santa Saturnina returned to Port Discovery in late July. The exact route taken is unclear. By this time many of Eliza's sailors were sick, as was Eliza himself. Further exploration was abandoned and the ships soon sailed for Nootka. Eliza transferred Narváez to the San Carlos and gave Juan Carrasco command of the Santa Saturnina.

Sailing west, the ships found Port Angeles on August 2, 1791. They reached Neah Bay on August 7. From there the San Carlos, returned to Nootka Sound, arriving on November 9. Carrasco, however, was unable or unwilling to beat upwind to Nootka and instead sailed the Santa Saturnina south to Monterey, California, arriving there on September 16, 1791. The two ships of the expedition of Alessandro Malaspina were at Monterey at the time, having arrived five days earlier. Thus Malaspina, a powerful figure of the Spanish navy at the time, became the first to know about the discovery of the Strait of Georgia, outside of Eliza's sailors at Nootka Sound. Malaspina immediately recognized the strategic importance of further exploration. European hopes of discovering a Northwest Passage were still politically important at the time, and the Strait of Georgia's many promising channels leading east and north represented one of the last realistic possibilities. Malaspina himself had just completed a fruitless search for a Northwest Passage in Alaska. Shortly after his encounter with Carrasco, Malaspina sailed to San Blas and Acapulco, where he arranged to have two of his own officers, Dionisio Alcalá Galiano and Cayetano Valdés, take command of two ships for the purpose of fully exploring the Strait of Georgia.

After his encounter with Malaspina in Monterey, Carrasco sailed the Santa Saturnina to San Blas. He continued to serve the Spanish Navy until at least 1803 as one of the pilots of the San Blas naval department.

== Legacy ==
Protection Island in the Strait of Juan de Fuca was given the name Isla de Carrasco in 1790. It was given its present name by George Vancouver in 1792. Barkley Sound, on the west coast of Vancouver Island, was named Boca de Carrasco by the Spanish.
