= Protection Island (Washington) =

American island

Protection Island National Wildlife Refuge
- IUCN category IV (habitat/species management area)
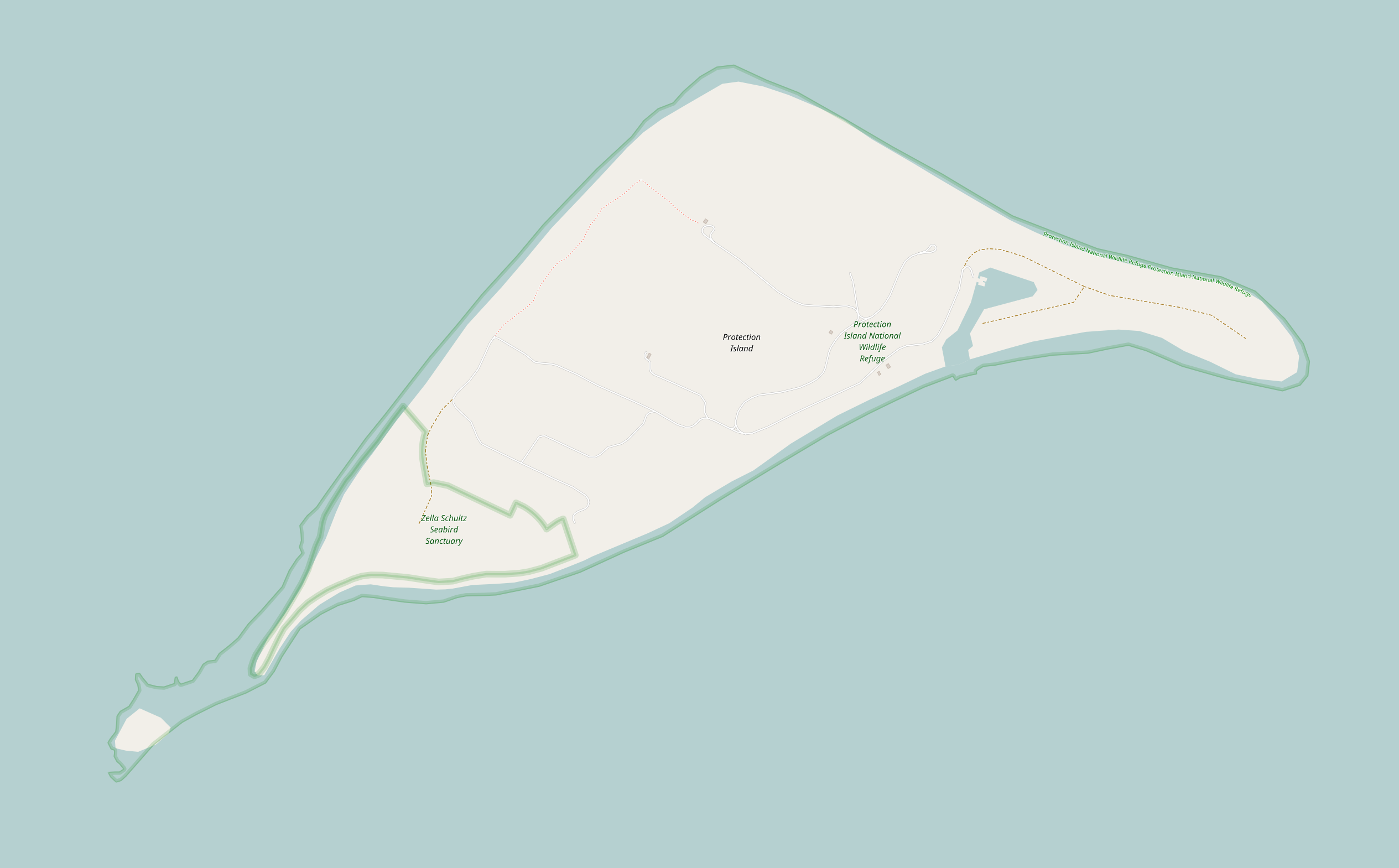
- Map of Protection Island

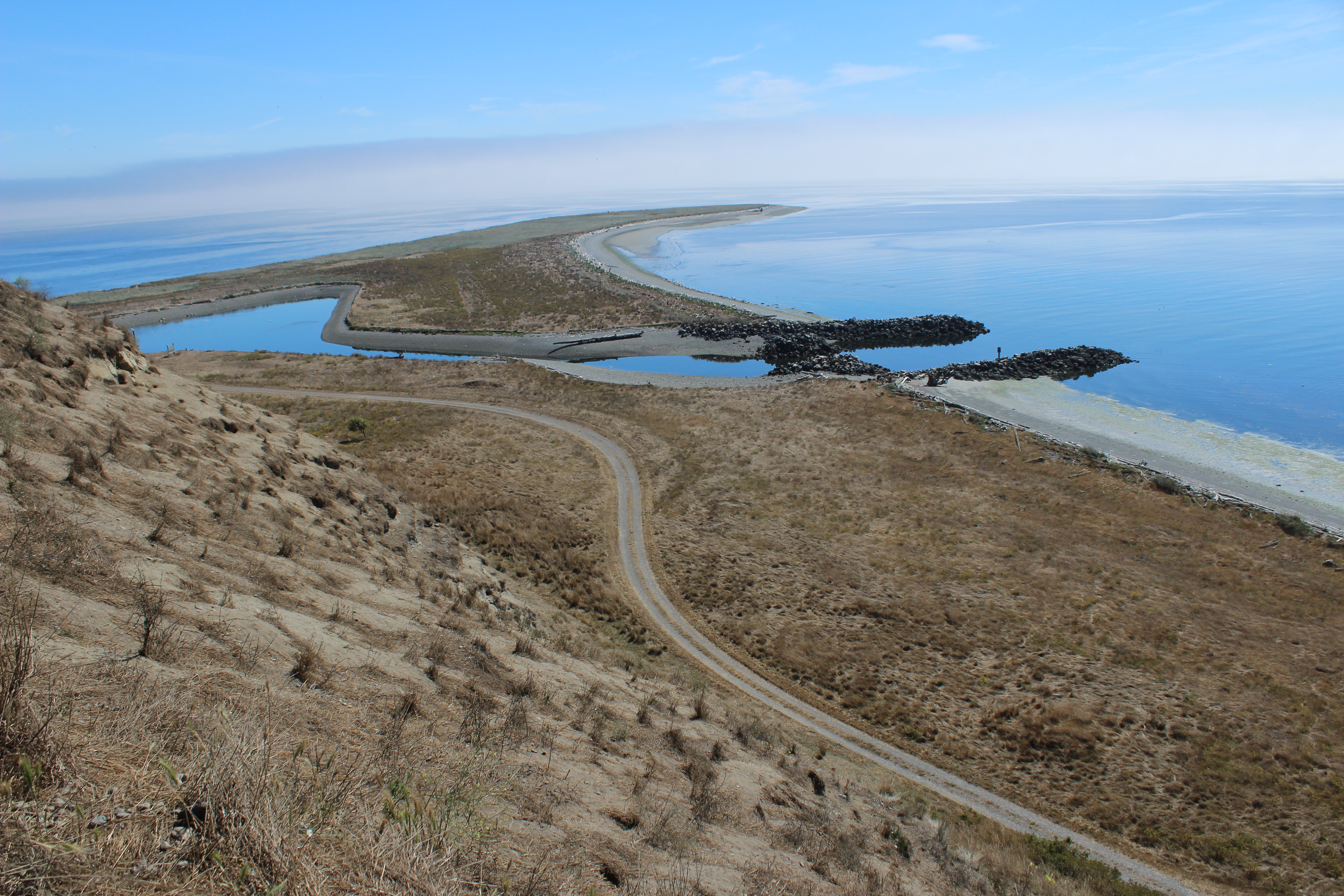
- Hillside of rhinoceros auklet burrows, Protection Island

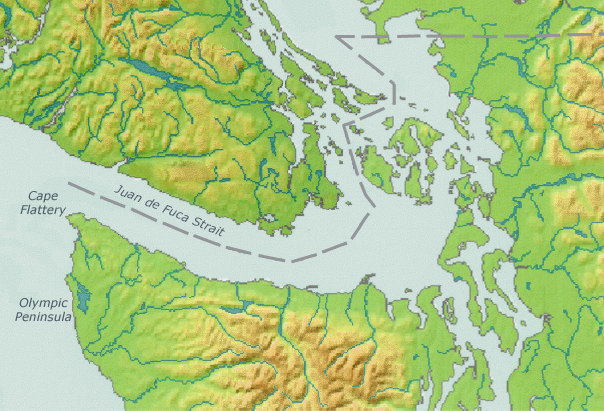
- Location within Strait of Juan de Fuca Location within Washington (state)
- Location: Jefferson County, Washington, United States
- Nearest city: Port Townsend, Washington
- Coordinates: 48°07′40″N 122°55′35″W
- Area: 659.31 acres (266.81 ha)
- Established: 1982
- Governing body: U.S. Fish and Wildlife Service
- Website: Protection Island National Wildlife Refuge

Protection Island is an island located in the Strait of Juan de Fuca just north of Discovery Bay in northeastern Jefferson County, Washington, United States. The island has a land area of 379 acres (153 ha). It is a federally protected National Wildlife Refuge; boats are not permitted within 200 yards (180 m) for the safety and health of wildlife on and near the shores. There is only one individual still living on the island not associated with the government. Marty Bluewater has lifetime use of his inholding cabin on the island's southern bluffs. The island also houses a caretaker, a volunteer hired by the United States Fish and Wildlife Service, to watch over the island and take care of its many inhabitants. Boat trips from nearby Port Townsend, Washington provide ecotourism visits for viewing wildlife from the adjacent waters.

Spanish explorers were the first Europeans to find the island. In 1790 it was given the name Isla de Carrasco, in honor of Juan Carrasco. It was given its present name by George Vancouver in 1792.

Protection Island National Wildlife Refuge was designated in 1982 to protect the entire island and its coast. Approximately 70 percent of the nesting seabird population of Puget Sound and the Strait of Juan de Fuca nest on the island, which includes one of the largest nesting colonies of rhinoceros auklets in the world and the largest nesting colony of glaucous-winged gulls in Washington. The island contains one of the last two nesting colonies of tufted puffins in the Puget Sound area. It is on the flyway for many migrating birds. Seals (harbor and elephant), sea lions, orcas, and other cetaceans are often seen nearby. About 1,000 harbor seals depend upon the island for a pupping and rest area.

The refuge is closed to visitation to protect the fragile habitat. Visitors may view the island by boat; a 200-yard off-shore buffer is enforced to ensure adult birds are not flushed from their nests.

The waters surrounding the North Olympic Peninsula support five additional refuges: Flattery Rocks, Quillayute Needles, Copalis, Dungeness, and San Juan Islands. Protection Island is managed as part of the Washington Maritime National Wildlife Refuge Complex.

== Gallery ==
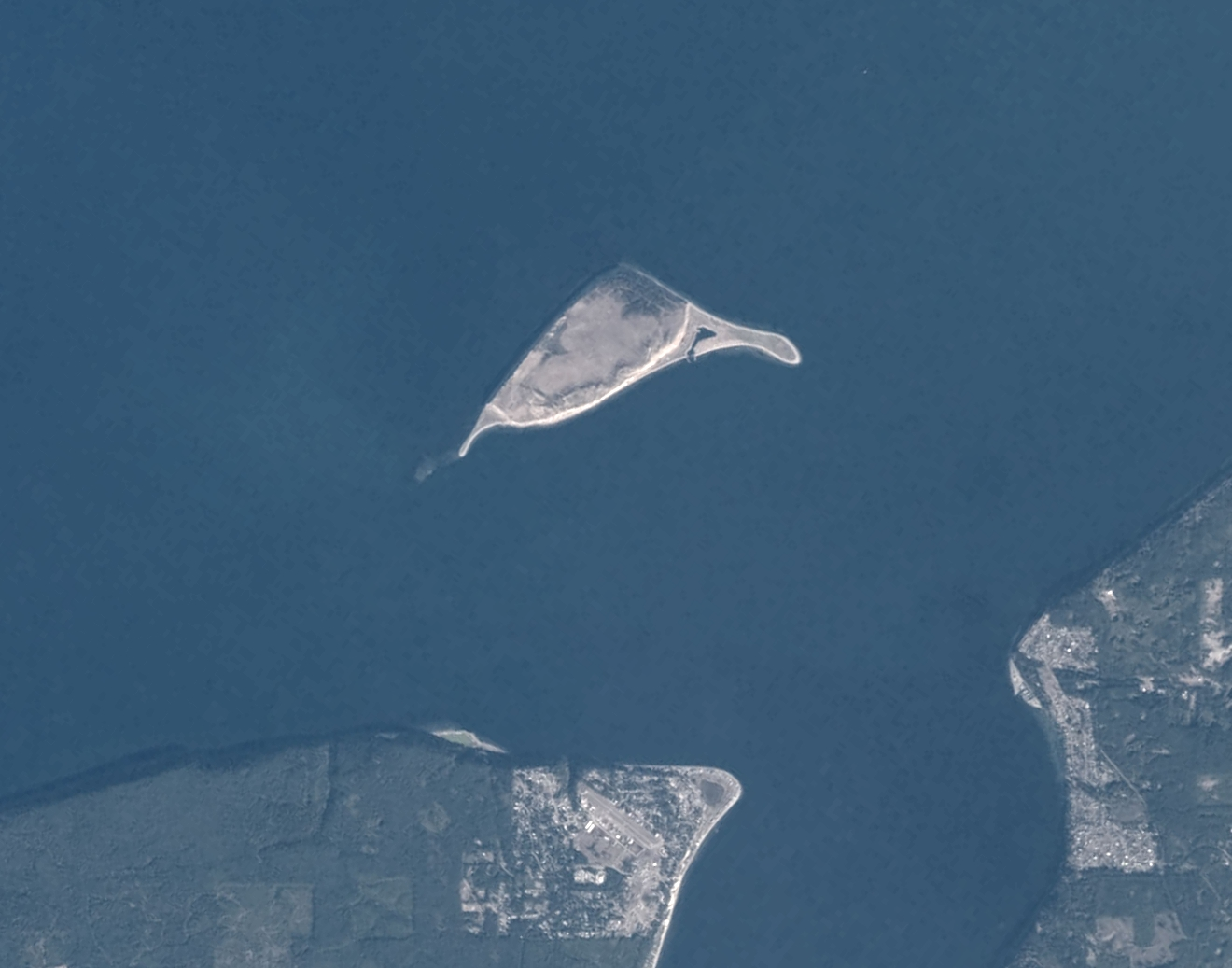
Satellite image

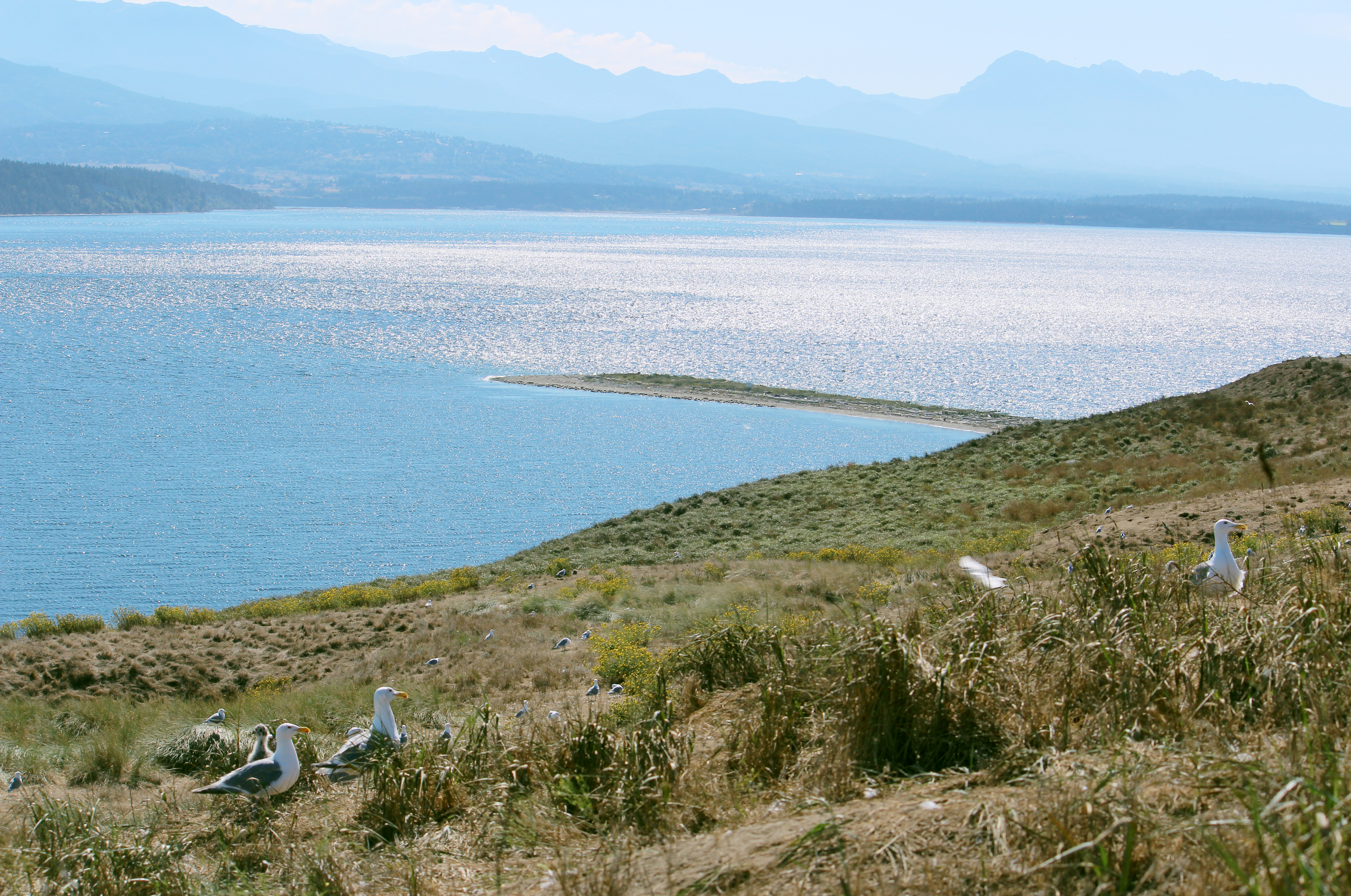
Birds nesting on Protection Island
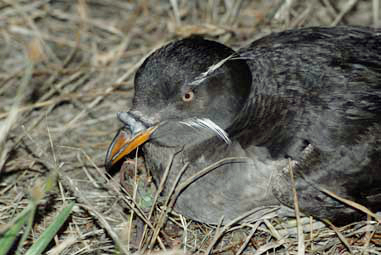
The refuge is home to 17,000 pairs of nesting rhinoceros auklets

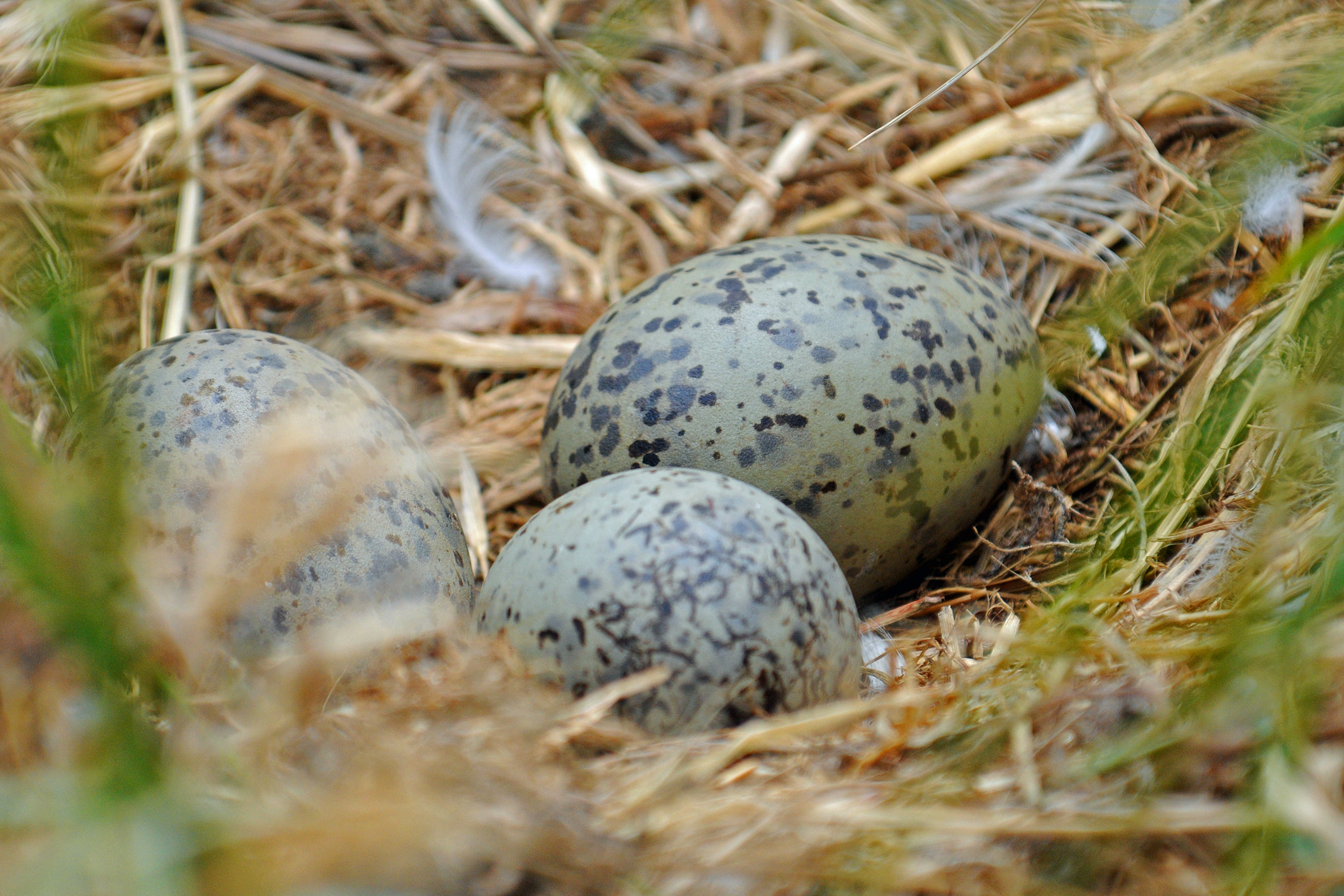
Gull nest on the refuge

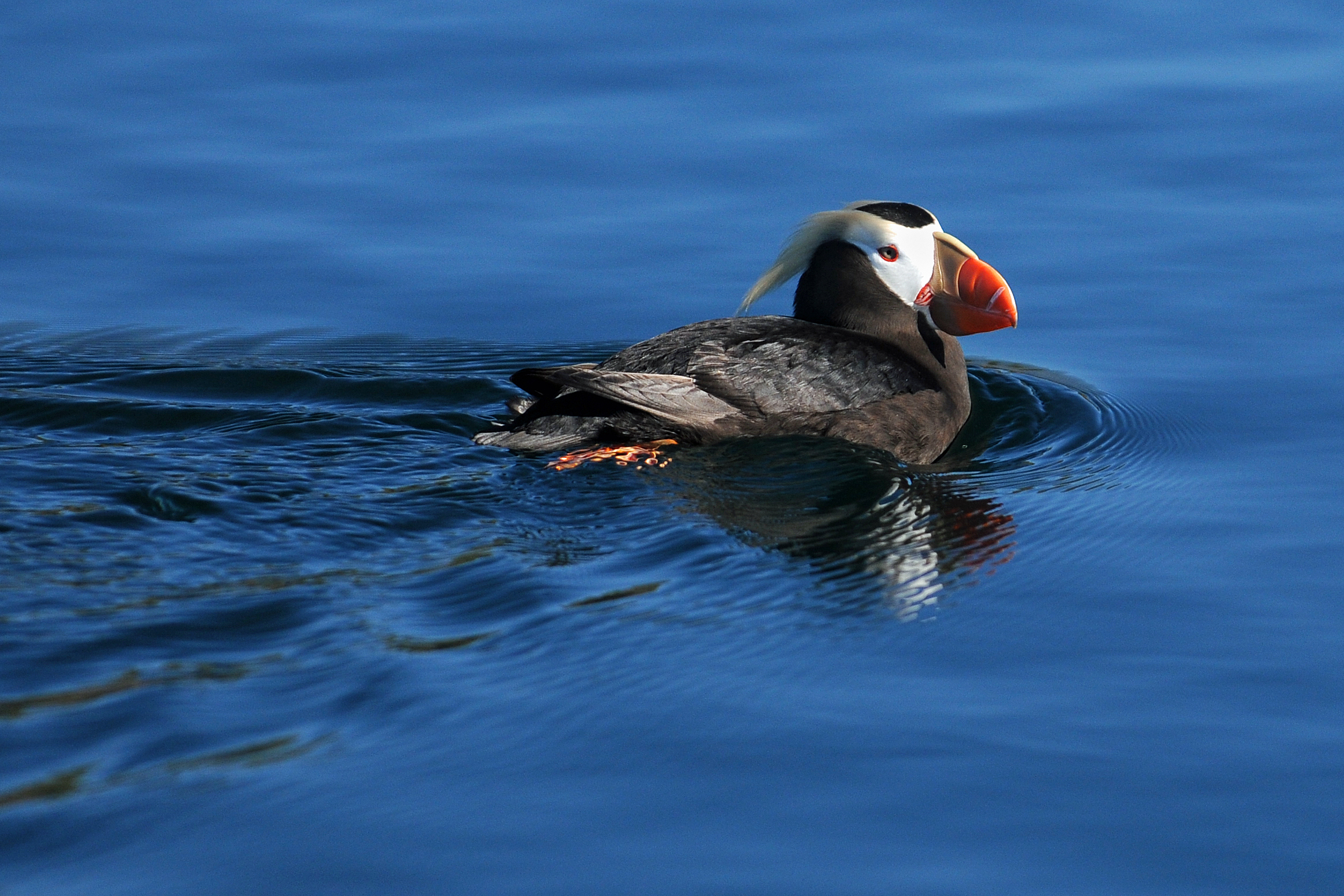
A tufted puffin swims in the refuge

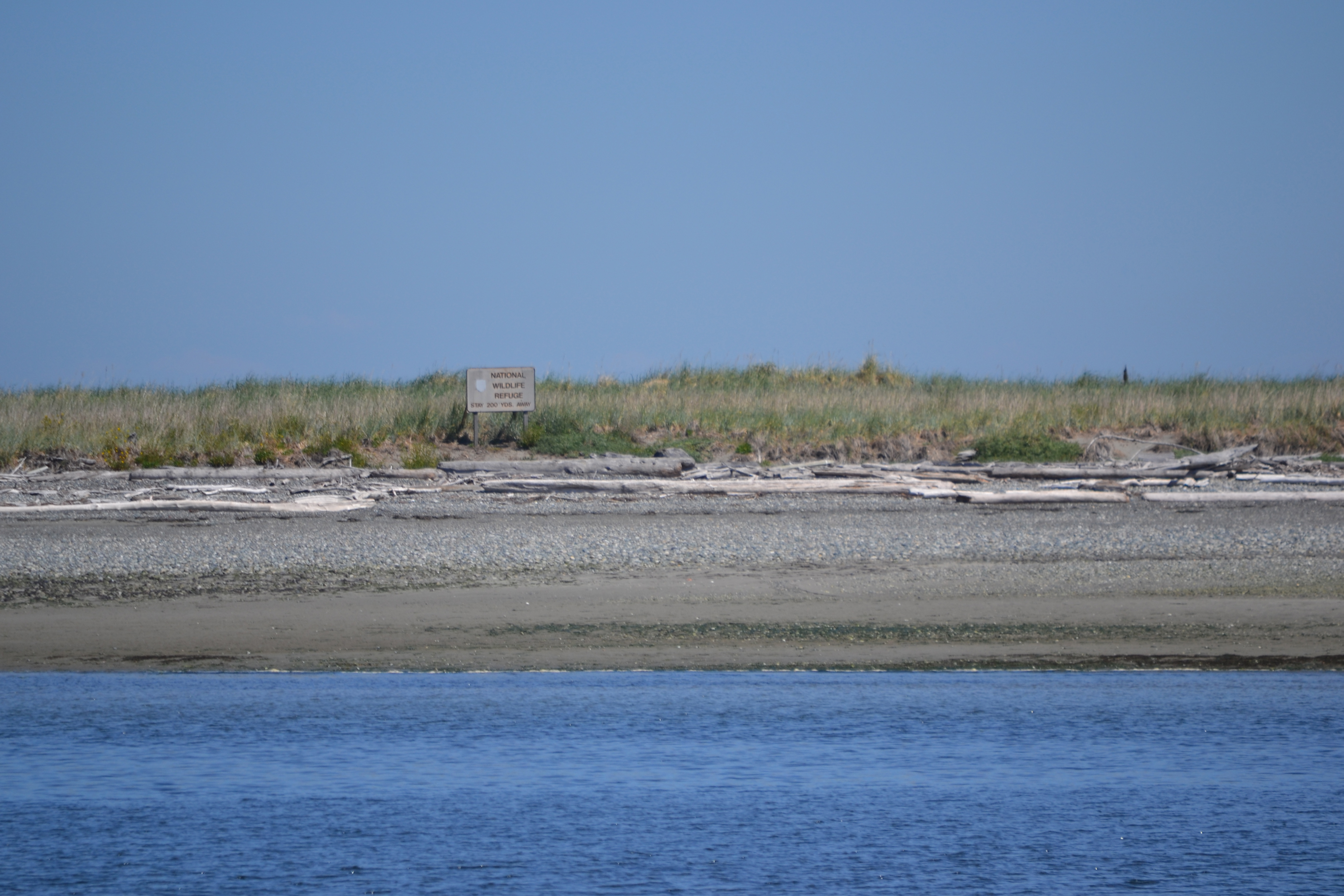
National Refuge sign warns visitors to stay 200 yards from shore
