= Quimper Peninsula =

Narrow peninsula in the northwestern United States of America

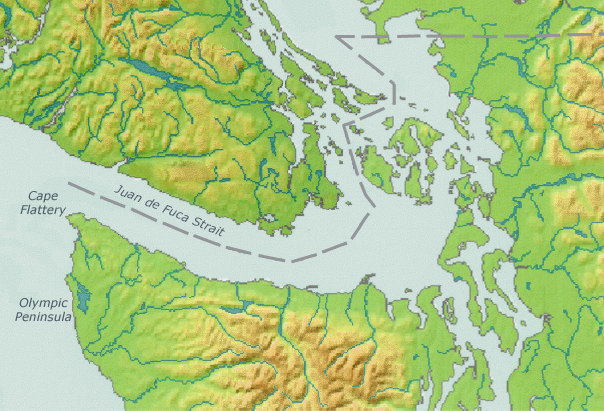
Location of Quimper Peninsula

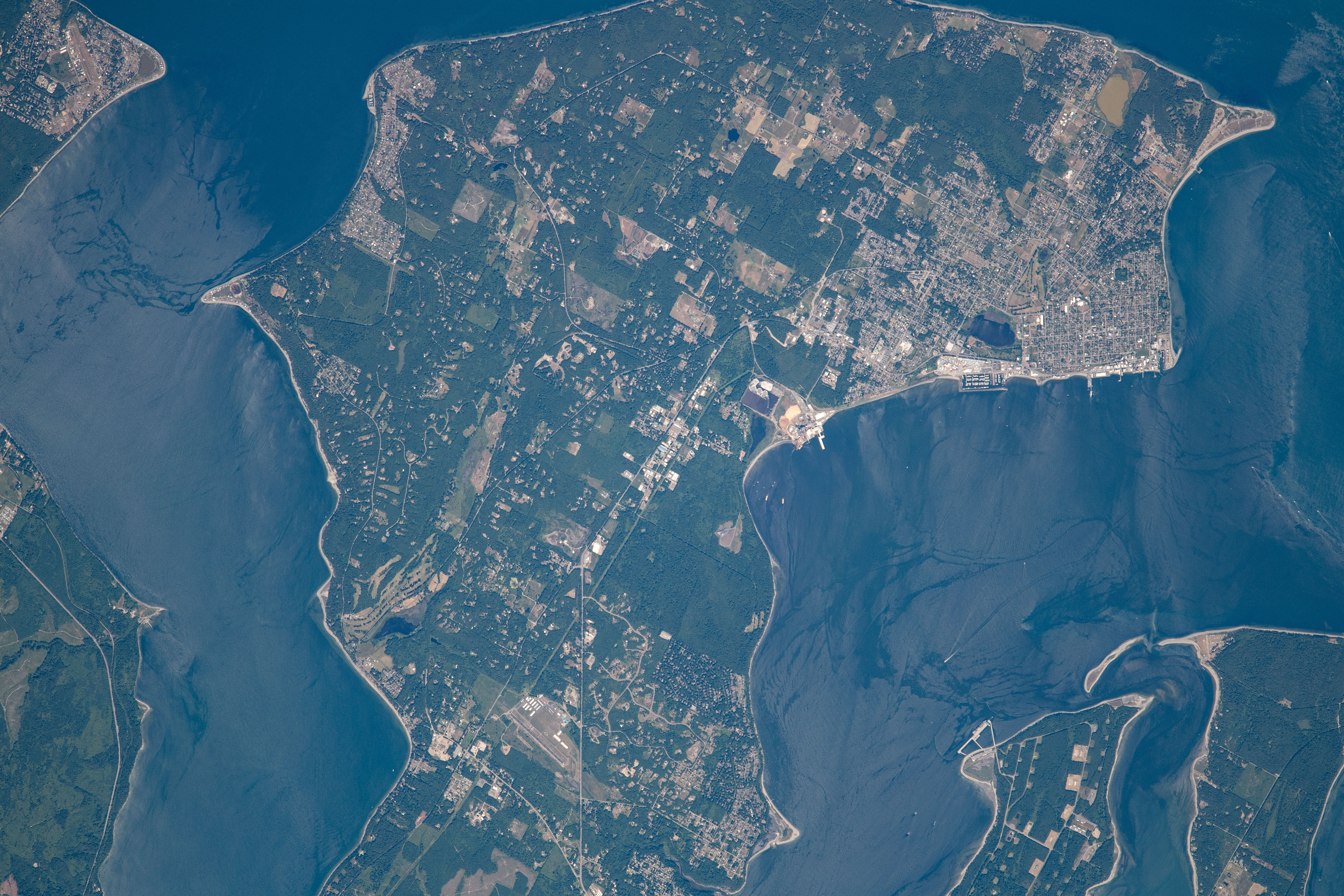
Satellite image of Quimper Peninsula, Discovery Bay is to the left and Port Townsend Bay to the right

The Quimper Peninsula is a narrow peninsula forming the most northeastern extent of the Olympic Peninsula of Washington state in the northwestern United States of America.

The peninsula is named after the Peruvian-born Spanish explorer Manuel Quimper who, in command of Princess Royal, charted the north and south coasts of the Strait of Juan de Fuca during the summer of 1790. The Spanish had given the name Quimper to today's New Dungeness Bay, which George Vancouver had renamed New Dungeness. In 1838 Charles Wilkes gave the peninsula the name Dickerson, but the U.S. Coast Survey renamed it with Quimper's name.

The Quimper Peninsula is defined by Discovery Bay to the west, the Strait of Juan de Fuca to the north, and Port Townsend Bay to the east. From the isthmus it extends approximately seven miles to the north-northwest and then curves to the northeast for another four miles before terminating at Point Wilson. For most of its length the width is less than four miles. This peninsula forms the westernmost boundary of Admiralty Inlet. Its approximate geographic center is at coordinates 48°5′N 122°50′W.

Although the Quimper Peninsula is geographically the most isolated part of Jefferson County, Washington, it is the most economically developed and densely populated part of the county. Port Townsend, the county seat and only incorporated city in the county, is located at the end of the peninsula. The communities of Cape George, Port Hadlock, Irondale, and Chimacum are on the peninsula south of Port Townsend. The name "Quimper Peninsula" has become a convenient means of referring collectively to Port Townsend and the surrounding communities.

When non-native explorers first arrived in the late 18th century, and the first non-native settlers in the mid-19th century, there were no permanent Native American settlements on the northern part of the peninsula as fresh water was obtainable only from streams at the southern end of the peninsula. The Chimakum lived along the southeastern shore of the peninsula and members of the S'Klallam along the southwestern shore. Because of strong tidal currents in Admiralty Inlet, Native Americans traveling between the Strait of Juan de Fuca and Puget Sound would often portage their canoes across the Quimper Peninsula by way of a prairie they called Kah Tai, that traversed the peninsula in present-day Port Townsend.
