= Manuel Quimper =

Peruvian explorer (circa 1757–1844)

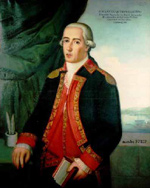

Manuel Quimper Benítez del Pino (c. 1757 – April 2, 1844) was a Spanish Peruvian explorer, cartographer, naval officer, and colonial official. He participated in charting the Strait of Juan de Fuca and the Hawaiian Islands in the late 18th century. He was later appointed a colonial governor in his native Peru at the beginning of the fight for independence there. He retired to Spain, but was able to return to Peru where he served as a naval officer in the new republic and pursued a literary career, publishing over 20 books about his experiences before his death there in Lima.

== Early life ==
Quimper was born in Lima, Peru to a French father and Spanish mother. At the age of thirteen he became a cadet with a company of the Spanish navy stationed at Callao, Peru, and participated in the exploration of Chiloé Island. In April 1771, with the endorsement of Peruvian Viceroy Manuel de Amat y Juniet, he was accepted at the Real y Pontificia Universidad de San Marcos in Lima, where he studied mathematics and their nautical applications, graduating in June 1774. Little is known of Quimper's family. In 1792, El Mercurio Peruano, a publication of the Sociedad Académica de Amantes de Lima, published a letter he had apparently written to a brother in Lima during his 1790 stay at Nootka Sound.

== Naval career ==
Following his university studies, Quimper was assigned to the frigate Áquila on a mission to re-affirm Spanish sovereignty over the island of Tahiti in the South Pacific and in the latter part of 1777 to deliver lumber from Guayaquil for naval construction at Callao. In late 1780 he was promoted to frigate ensign (alférez de fragata) and assigned the transport of food from Callao to Talcahuano. Two years later he was sent to chart the Juan Fernández Islands in the South Pacific and upon his return to port at Valparaíso received recognition for his cartographic skills. In 1786 he embarked on a four-month sail to the Spanish port of Cádiz. Within a month he had been promoted to ship ensign (alférez de navío) and received permission to serve at the court of King Carlos III in Madrid for four months before returning to sea assigned to the protection of the Gulf of Cádiz.

The Spanish court was becoming increasingly concerned about British and Russian incursions along the Pacific Northwest coast of North America. Seven naval officers were dispatched to learn of British and Russian intentions. These included Quimper and his fellow Peruvian Juan Francisco de la Bodega y Quadra, who was named commander of the Naval Department of San Blas. They departed from Cadiz aboard the San Ramon in May 1789. Shortly after their arrival at Veracruz, the seven were transferred to San Blas.

In July 1789 they received news from the Pacific Northwest with the arrival of the Princesa Real, a fur-trading vessel captured from the British at Nootka Sound by Spanish commander Esteban José Martinez. In 1788 the British explorer John Meares had established a fur trading post on Nootka Sound. Spain considered this settlement an invasion of Spanish territory and had dispatched Martínez to occupy the port the following year. Martínez arrived in 1789 with warships, seized the port and some vessels, including the sloop Princess Royal which he renamed the Princesa Real. The sloop was dispatched to San Blas at the disposition of New Spain Viceroy Revillagigedo. The Viceroy, however, wished to avoid further difficulties with the British and ordered Quimper to return the vessel.

On 3 February 1790, a Spanish expedition sailed north from San Blas under the command of Ship Lieutenant Francisco de Eliza, the most senior officer available at San Blas. It included Ship Lieutenant Salvador Fidalgo, and Ship Ensign Manuel Quimper. Their purpose was to strengthen the settlement at Nootka Sound, to further chart the waters of the Strait of Juan de Fuca and the San Juan Islands, and to return the Princesa Real to the British. After several weeks at sea, the Princesa Real and Quimper arrived with difficulty at Nootka Sound where repairs on the vessel were undertaken before returning the ship to the British. Throughout the month of May the Princesa Real was repaired with no sign of the British. Quimper then used the vessel to carry out a two-month exploration of the north and south coasts of the Strait of Juan de Fuca.

During June and July he charted and named many geographic features along the south shore of Vancouver Island and the north coast of the Olympic Peninsula. He was the first European to report seeing Mount Baker, which he named La Gran Montagna Carmelita. On the Olympic Peninsula he traded with and observed the customs of indigenous people near Dungeness (which he named Bahia de Quimper) and near the Elwha River, which were most likely members of the S'Klallam tribe in both instances and he was possibly the first European they had seen. Most of his discoveries along the strait were renamed by British Captain George Vancouver in 1792. Those which retained at least a semblance of his Spanish names include Port Angeles, Rosario Strait, Quimper Peninsula, and Fidalgo Island.

During Quimper's 1791 expedition to northern Puget Sound Quimper's sloop Eliza stopped in the southern area of Bellingham Bay (Gulfo de Gaston). During this brief encampment near the mouth of present-day Padden Creek, several of Quimper's men reportedly ran across a group of hostile natives (Lummi) who drove Quimper's men back to their rowboat. In later years during the construction of a powerhouse along the creek in Victorian era Fairhaven a gilded Spanish goblet and the deteriorated remains of a Spanish type musket were recovered. Modern archaeological studies of the area have not been documented concerning the presence of Quimper and his men.

Quimper returned to Nootka Sound in early August but was unable to enter the port for several days due to heavy fog. He set sail for New Spain and arrived at Monterey on 1 September 1790. From there he was joined by Fidalgo aboard the San Carlos. They arrived at San Blas on 13 November 1790. Viceroy Revillagigedo was surprised to learn that the Princesa Real was still in Spanish possession. He dispatched a message to the Court in Madrid recommending the return of the vessel to the British at Macau and sent a report of Quimper's explorations in the Pacific Northwest with nine of his charts. Quimper was promoted to frigate lieutenant.

On 14 February 1791, Quimper set sail aboard the Princesa Real with orders from San Blas commander Juan Francisco de la Bodega y Quadra to chart the Sandwich Islands and then turn the vessel over to the Philippines Governor-General Félix Berenguer de Marquina, who would then have it returned to the British at Macau. While exploring the Sandwich Islands he had a tense encounter with James Colnett, the British commander at Nootka, on 1 April 1791. Colnett demanded an explanation from Quimper as to why the Princesa Real had not yet been returned to the British and Quimper informed him of the plans to return it at Macau. Colnett threatened to seize the ship then and there, but when he observed Quimper preparing for combat he backed down. Quimper continued his exploration of the islands of Hawaii, Maui, and Oahu, and, on 19 April 1791, set sail for the Philippines.

Quimper arrived at the Cavite naval base on Manila Bay on 4 June 1791. He handed over the ship to Vicente Llanos y Valdés, a relative of the Minister of the Navy. The Princesa Real was returned to Macau on 12 August 1791, but a strong hurricane soon struck there badly damaging the ship, and it was later sold for salvage. Spanish explorer Alessandro Malaspina returned to Manila from his exploration of the Marianas Islands and Quimper helped to create charts of his findings.

On 21 May 1792, Quimper was given command of the frigate San José de las Ánimas and sailed for San Blas, accompanied by the schooner Valdés under the command of Lieutenant Cosme Bertadano. The two vessels were soon separated by a hurricane causing the Valdés to return to Manila. Quimper continued on to San Blas. His ship was badly damaged by the weather and he did not arrive until nearly six months later on 6 November 1792. He learned that on 15 October, orders had been issued granting him permission to marry Francisca Márquez, and appointing him as special assistant to his countryman and friend Juan Francisco de la Bodega y Quadra, the naval commander at San Blas, who was in failing health but did not want to resign his command while the international situation was deteriorating and war was likely. He held this position until February 1794 when Bordega y Quadra died.

Quimper himself was in poor health and was therefore granted permission in June 1795 to return to Spain. While waiting at Veracruz to embark on this voyage he was named the captain of the corvette Atrevida and sailed on this ship to Cádiz while it was still under the command of Malaspina. Quimper apparently never took command of the Atrevida because while it was at the port of Cádiz, he requested and was granted a transfer to Madrid to attend to personal matters. Eight months later he was inducted into the prestigious Orden Militar de Calatrava.

Quimper then served at Algeciras under the command of Bruno de Heceta, a veteran explorer who had also explored the Pacific Northwest of America. He soon asked for the governorship of Guayaquil, but was instead given command of the naval fleet at Madrid, a position he maintained until 1802. He was then appointed the Minister of the Treasury in Veracruz and so returned to America in a ministerial position.

=== Places named by Quimper ===
- Bahía de Bodega y Quadra (now Discovery Bay, Washington at 48°3′0″N 122°52′0″W)
- Bahía de Nuñez Gaona (now Neah Bay, Washington at 48°21′56″N 124°36′56″W)
- Bonilla Point, British Columbia
- Ensenada de Quadra (now Maalaea, Maui, Hawaii)
- Ensenada de Quimper (now Pearl Harbor, Oahu, Hawaii)
- Ensenada de Ulloa (now Kawaihae Bay, Hawaii Island, Hawaii)
- Gonzales Point, Victoria, British Columbia (and indirectly Gonzales Bay, Gonzales Hill at the same location)
- Gran Mountain de Carmello (now Mount Baker, Washington at 48°46′0″N 121°48′0″W)
- Jordan River, British Columbia (and indirectly the settlement of Jordan River, British Columbia at the mouth of that river
- Haro Strait, British Columbia/Washington
- Nuestra Señora de Los Angeles (now Port Angeles, Washington at 48°7′20″N 123°26′30″W)
- Puerta de Revillagigedo (now Sooke, British Columbia at 48°22′55″N 123°43′52″W)
- Puerto de Cordova (now Esquimalt, British Columbia at 48°25′50″N 123°24′29″W)
- Puerto de Quimper (now Dungeness Bay, Washington at 48°9′45″N 123°9′0″W)
- Puerto de San Juan (now Port San Juan, the harbour at Port Renfrew, British Columbia at 48°33′31″N 124°23′57″W)
- Punta de San Miguel (now Albert Head, British Columbia)
- Punta de Santa Cruz (now Dungeness, Washington at 48°8′0″N 123°9′0″W)
- Punta de Santo Domingo (now William Head, British Columbia)
- Rada de Eliza (now Pedder Bay, British Columbia)
- Rada de Solano (now Parry Bay, British Columbia)
- Rada de Valdes y Bazan (now Royal Roads, British Columbia)
- Sombrio River, British Columbia

=== Places named for Quimper ===
- Quimper Peninsula (48°5′N 122°50′W) in the state of Washington
- Mount Manuel Quimper (48°25′N 123°40′W) on Vancouver Island, British Columbia, Canada
- Quimper Park, a commemorative site near Sooke, British Columbia, dedicated on 23 June 1990, to mark the 200th anniversary of Quimper's landing there
- Quimper Street, Oak Bay, British Columbia, Canada

== Governmental career ==
Quimper was appointed in 1802 a Spanish treasury minister to oversee imperial disbursements in Veracruz. In 1805 he was appointed the governor of Huamanga (later renamed Ayacucho) in the southern part of his native Peru, but due to a confusing incident involving the newly appointed Viceroy of Peru, José Fernando de Abascal y Sousa, he instead became the governor of the Peruvian Intendancy of Puno on Lake Titicaca.

During his term as governor (Intendente) of Puno an independence movement emerged of which Quimper warned Viceroy Abascal in July 1809. Quimper's own carefully guarded collection of papers, maps, manuscripts, and books were destroyed in an uprising of the local people. He was removed as governor at the end of January 1810. His successor, Manuel Antonio Nieto, died within months and Quimper returned to Puno as governor in June 1810.

In early 1813, Quimper was at the center of the political storm that began brewing in southern Peru with the elections promulgated by the Constitution of Cadiz (1812). Elected officials in various towns (notably Puno and Azangaro) almost immediately began asserting local control and directly challenged the royalist command. Quimper then writes to the Vicerroy that descended upon Puno "is a spirit of anarchy found among many individuals in this capital who shroud themselves with the wise Constitution.". Quimper provides an account of the subsequent events that lead to a massive uprising across the Intendancy. In the city of Puno, he later identified the elected mayor Benito Laso de la Vega as the "main revolutionary.". As Quimper desperately tries to quell the mass-insurrection throughout his territory, the Cusco Rebellion explodes onto the scene on August 3, 1814. Within weeks, the patriot army arrives from Cusco to Puno. Quimper relates how in the middle of the night of August 24, 1814, he was informed that the city garrison had defected to the patriot cause. Quimper flees for his life to Arequipa, where he goes into hiding until the Spanish General Ramirez marches from Oruro and restores royalist control in Puno and then Arequipa (December 9, 1814). Id. While Ramirez confronts the main patriot army on the return to Cusco, he sends Quimper back to Puno to maintain order. On March 11, 1815, Quimper sends an ill-fated royalist expedition to nearby Capachica. The entire royalist expedition is massacred. Ramirez sacks Quimper, and replaces him with Col. Francisco de Paula Gonzalez, who will lead a "pacification" campaign well into 1816 to forcibly suppress and end the rebellion across the Intendancy of Puno. By 1816, Quimper takes his place in Huamanga as the local governor.

== Retirement in Spain ==
While Quimper was in Spain, his son Colonel Manuel Quimper, was fighting for the Spanish cause in Peru. He had been serving in Upper Peru until named the commander-in-chief of Spanish forces of the southern coast of Peru on 9 February 1820. The young Manuel Quimper suffered a major defeat while defending the city of Nazca and was forced to flee to the coast in October 1820.

Meanwhile, in Madrid the senior Quimper received the military honor of La Cruz de San Hermenegildo in 1820. Quimper also began to receive recognition for his literary talent. In 1821 Imprenta Alvarez published his 180-page manuscript of Décima poetry entitled Laicas vivacidades de Quimper, antorcha peruana, acaecimientos del Perú en civiles guerras, promovidas por el Reino de Buenos-Ayres, desde el año 1809 hasta el de 1818, describing his personal observations of the civil wars in Peru from 1809 to 1818.

Still showing regret over the loss of the documents which had been destroyed at Puno, at the end of 1821 he solicited the endorsement of José de Bustamante, the director-general of the National Armada, for the publication of a recounting of his experiences aboard the Atrevida in Manila Bay thirty years earlier. He apparently received no support from Bustamante. Nevertheless, in 1822 Quimper published in Madrid his book Islas Sandwich: Descripción sucinta de este archipiélago, which had been previously published in El Mercurio Peruano. In the "Introducción" to this book he attempted to explain himself and his return to Spain, citing his naval service to Spain since adolescence, and the fact that he had been treated as an American in Spain, and as a Spaniard in Peru.

== Return to Peru ==
Quimper longed to return to his native land of Peru and in February 1822 took steps to assure sympathetic treatment there upon his return. He returned shortly thereafter and is reported to have become a Peruvian "Patriot" in 1823. The government of the Republic of Peru named him a naval commander in 1827 and later a captain. He wrote the poem Poema raro, segments of which were published in La Gazeta de Lima. He died in Lima in April 1844.

== See also ==
- Juan Carrasco (explorer)
