= Jefferson County, Washington =

County in Washington, United States

- County
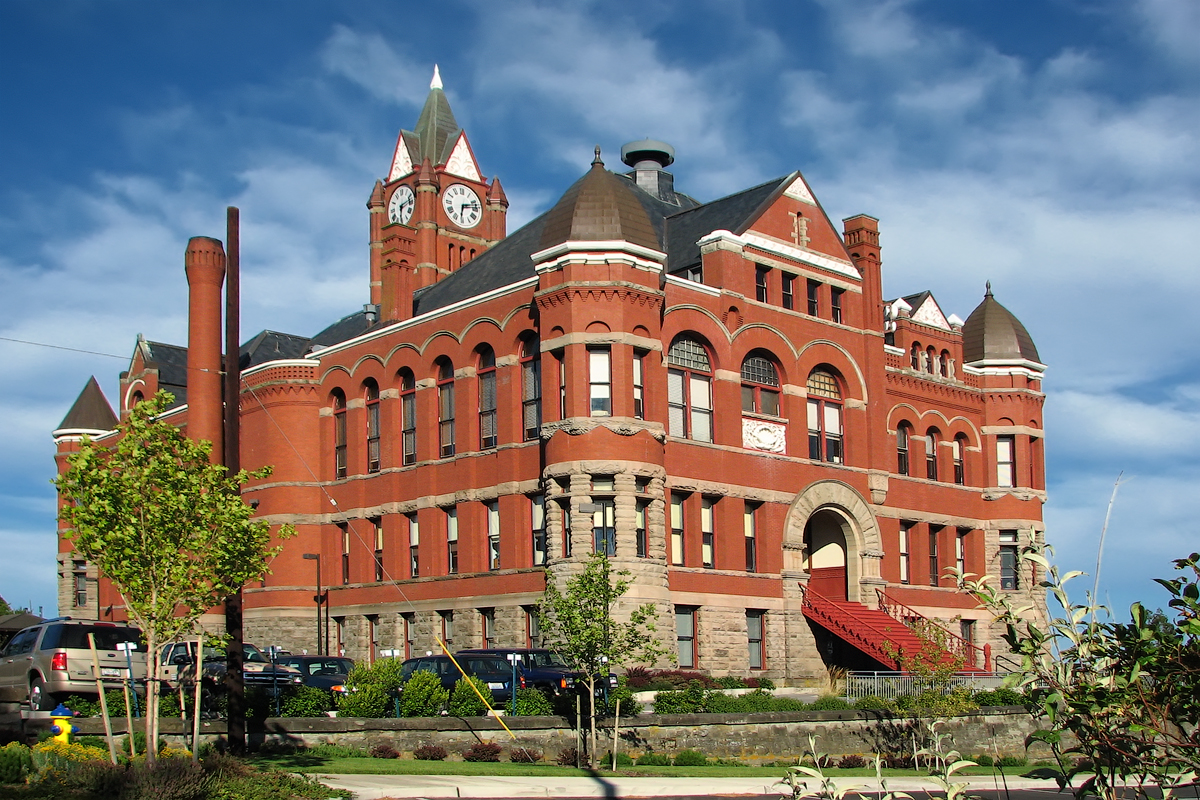
- Jefferson County Courthouse in Port Townsend

- Flag Seal

- Location within the U.S. state of Washington
- Coordinates: 47°50′N 123°35′W
- Country: United States
- State: Washington
- Founded: December 22, 1852
- Named for: Thomas Jefferson
- Seat: Port Townsend
- Largest city: Port Townsend

Area
  - Total: 2,183 sq mi (5,650 km^{2})
  - Land: 1,804 sq mi (4,670 km^{2})
  - Water: 379 sq mi (980 km^{2}) 17%

Population (2020)
  - Total: 32,977
  - Estimate (2025): 33,970 ▲
  - Density: 17/sq mi (6.6/km^{2})
- Time zone: UTC−8 (Pacific)
  - Summer (DST): UTC−7 (PDT)
- Congressional district: 6th
- Website: co.jefferson.wa.us

Jefferson County is a county located in the U.S. state of Washington. As of the 2020 census, the population was 32,977. The county seat and only incorporated city is Port Townsend. The county is named after Thomas Jefferson.

Jefferson County was formed from Thurston County on December 22, 1852, by the legislature of Oregon Territory, and included the northern 4,854-square-mile (12,571.8 km^{2}) portion of the Olympic Peninsula. On April 26, 1854, the legislature of Washington Territory created Clallam County from the northwestern 2,670-square-mile (6,915.3 km^{2}) portion of this original area.

The Hood Canal Bridge connects Jefferson County to Kitsap County, Washington. The Coupeville-Port Townsend route of the Washington State Ferries connects the county to Whidbey Island in Island County, Washington.

== Geography ==
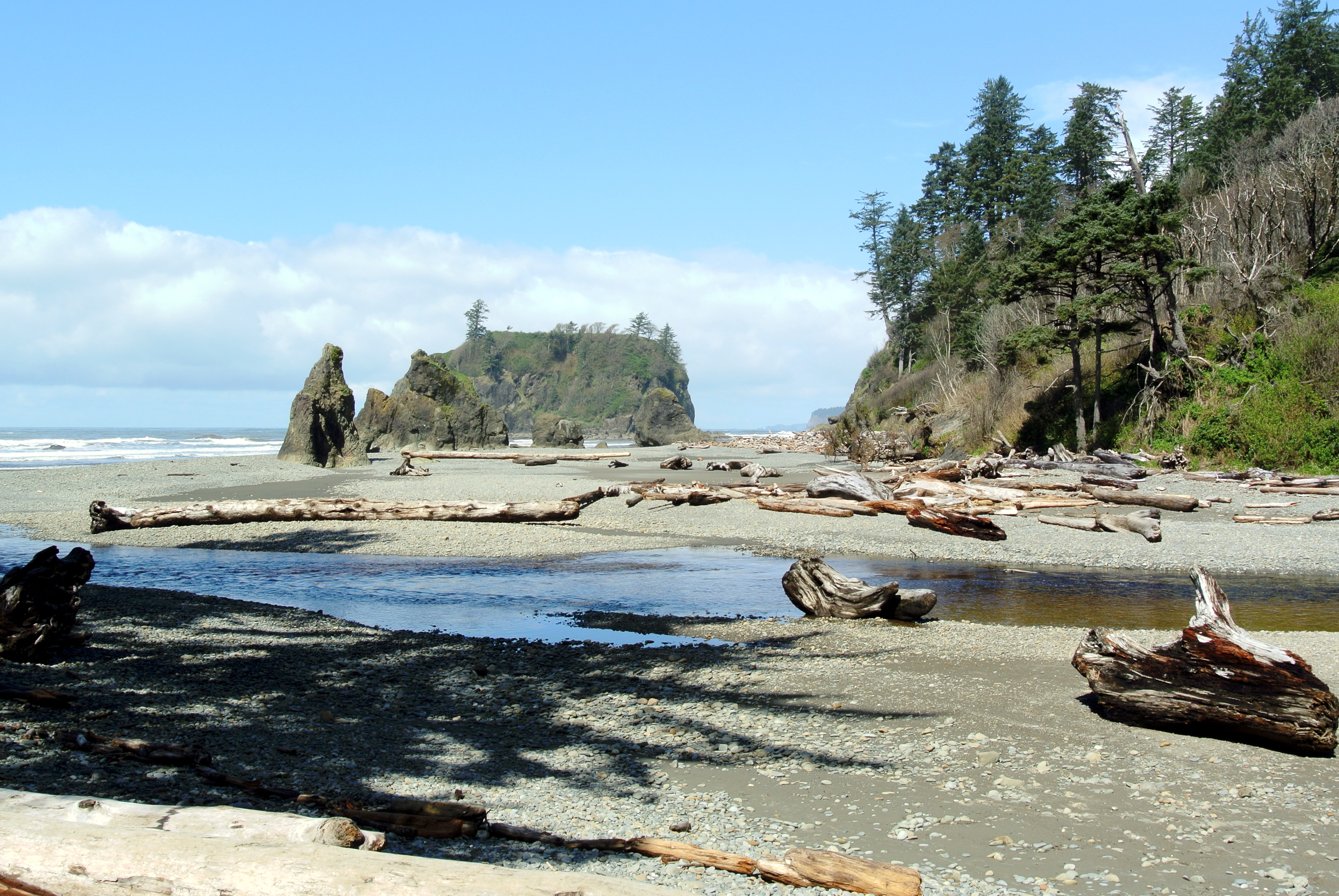
Ruby Beach, Kalaloch Area

According to the United States Census Bureau, the county has a total area of 2,183 square miles (5,650 km^{2}), of which 1,804 square miles (4,670 km^{2}) is land and 379 square miles (980 km^{2}) (17%) is water.

The county is split in three parts by its landforms:

- Eastern Jefferson County along the Strait of Juan de Fuca, Admiralty Inlet, Puget Sound, and Hood Canal
- Central Jefferson County, which is uninhabited and lies in the Olympic Mountains within Olympic National Park and Olympic National Forest
- Western Jefferson County, along the Pacific Ocean.

Because of the mountainous barrier, there is no road lying entirely within Jefferson County that connects the eastern and western parts. The most direct land route between the two ends of the county involves a drive of approximately 100 miles (160 km) along U.S. Route 101 through neighbouring Clallam County. The mountains also block the damp Chinook winds, which make the climate much wetter in the west than the so-called eastern "banana belt" in the rain shadow.

=== Geographic features ===
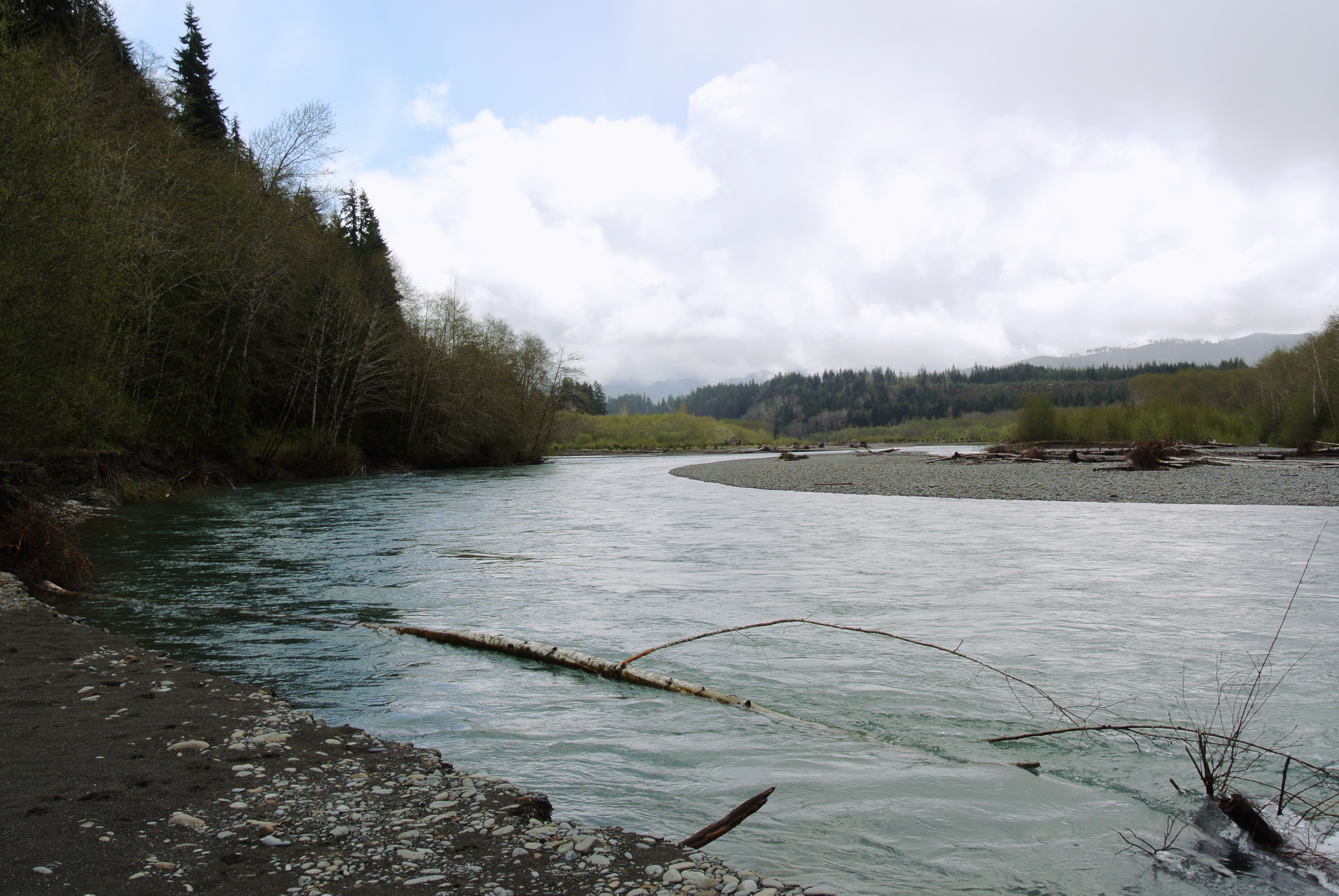
Hoh River in the Olympic National Park

- Admiralty Inlet
- Bolton Peninsula
- Destruction Island
- Discovery Bay
- Hood Canal
- Mount Olympus, the highest point on the Olympic Peninsula
- Olympic Mountains
- Olympic Peninsula
- Pacific Ocean
- Point Wilson
- Port Townsend Bay
- Protection Island
- Puget Sound
- Queets River
- Quimper Peninsula
- Strait of Juan de Fuca
- Toandos (Coyle) Peninsula

=== Major highways ===
- U.S. Route 101
- State Route 20
- State Route 104

=== Adjacent counties ===
- Island County – northeast
- Kitsap County – southeast
- Mason County – south/southeast
- Grays Harbor County – south/southwest
- Clallam County – northwest
- San Juan County – northeast

=== National protected areas ===
- Olympic National Forest (part)
- Olympic National Park (part)
- Protection Island National Wildlife Refuge
- Quillayute Needles National Wildlife Refuge (part)
- Pacific Northwest National Scenic Trail (part)

== Demographics ==
Historical population
Census	Pop.	Note	%±
1860	531		—
1870	1,268		138.8%
1880	1,712		35.0%
1890	8,368		388.8%
1900	5,712		−31.7%
1910	8,337		46.0%
1920	6,557		−21.4%
1930	8,346		27.3%
1940	8,918		6.9%
1950	11,618		30.3%
1960	9,639		−17.0%
1970	10,661		10.6%
1980	15,965		49.8%
1990	20,146		26.2%
2000	25,953		28.8%
2010	29,872		15.1%
2020	32,977		10.4%
2025 (est.)	33,970	▲	3.0%
U.S. Decennial Census; 1790–1960 1900–1990; 1990–2000 2010–2020

Jefferson County also comprises the entirety of the Port Townsend micropolitan statistical area, which is designated by the U.S. Census Bureau. As of 2023, the county's median age of 60.8 years old is the second-highest among metropolitan and micropolitan areas in the country, behind The Villages, Florida.

=== 2020 census ===
As of the 2020 census, the county had a population of 32,977. Of the residents, 12.2% were under the age of 18 and 39.0% were 65 years of age or older; the median age was 59.6 years. For every 100 females there were 96.7 males, and for every 100 females age 18 and over there were 95.1 males. 46.7% of residents lived in urban areas and 53.3% lived in rural areas.

Jefferson County, Washington – Racial and ethnic composition Note: the US Census treats Hispanic/Latino as an ethnic category. This table excludes Latinos from the racial categories and assigns them to a separate category. Hispanics/Latinos may be of any race.
Race / Ethnicity (NH = Non-Hispanic)	Pop 2000	Pop 2010	Pop 2020	% 2000	% 2010	% 2020
White alone (NH)	23,628	26,681	28,216	91.04%	89.32%	85.56%
Black or African American alone (NH)	103	237	207	0.40%	0.79%	0.63%
Native American or Alaska Native alone (NH)	574	628	522	2.21%	2.10%	1.58%
Asian alone (NH)	300	460	487	1.16%	1.54%	1.48%
Pacific Islander alone (NH)	34	62	49	0.13%	0.21%	0.15%
Other race alone (NH)	70	61	229	0.27%	0.20%	0.69%
Mixed race or Multiracial (NH)	709	895	1,962	2.73%	3.00%	5.95%
Hispanic or Latino (any race)	535	848	1,305	2.06%	2.84%	3.96%
Total	25,953	29,872	32,977	100.00%	100.00%	100.00%

The racial makeup of the county was 86.7% White, 0.6% Black or African American, 1.7% American Indian and Alaska Native, 1.5% Asian, 1.6% from some other race, and 7.7% from two or more races. Hispanic or Latino residents of any race comprised 4.0% of the population.

There were 15,707 households in the county, of which 15.1% had children under the age of 18 living with them and 25.9% had a female householder with no spouse or partner present. About 32.9% of all households were made up of individuals and 19.7% had someone living alone who was 65 years of age or older.

There were 19,087 housing units, of which 17.7% were vacant. Among occupied housing units, 76.5% were owner-occupied and 23.5% were renter-occupied. The homeowner vacancy rate was 1.1% and the rental vacancy rate was 4.9%.

=== 2010 census ===
As of the 2010 census, there were 29,872 people, 14,049 households, and 8,394 families living in the county. The population density was 16.6 inhabitants per square mile (6.4/km^{2}). There were 17,767 housing units at an average density of 9.9 per square mile (3.8/km^{2}). The racial makeup of the county was 91.0% white, 2.3% American Indian, 1.6% Asian, 0.8% black or African American, 0.2% Pacific islander, 0.7% from other races, and 3.4% from two or more races. Those of Hispanic or Latino origin made up 2.8% of the population. In terms of ancestry, 20.8% were English, 20.3% were German, 13.9% were Irish, 8.3% were Norwegian, 5.9% were Scottish, and 4.2% were American.

Of the 14,049 households, 18.2% had children under the age of 18 living with them, 49.1% were married couples living together, 7.3% had a female householder with no husband present, 40.3% were non-families, and 32.2% of all households were made up of individuals. The average household size was 2.08 and the average family size was 2.57. The median age was 53.9 years.

The median income for a household in the county was $46,048 and the median income for a family was $59,964. Males had a median income of $45,616 versus $29,508 for females. The per capita income for the county was $28,528. About 8.9% of families and 13.5% of the population were below the poverty line, including 20.8% of those under age 18 and 7.4% of those age 65 or over.

=== 2000 census ===
As of the 2000 census, there were 25,953 people, 11,645 households, and 7,580 families living in the county. The population density was 14 people per square mile (5.4 people/km^{2}). There were 14,144 housing units at an average density of 8 per square mile (3.1/km^{2}). The racial makeup of the county was 92.17% White, 0.42% Black or African American, 2.31% Native American, 1.19% Asian, 0.13% Pacific Islander, 0.76% from other races, and 3.02% from two or more races. 2.06% of the population were Hispanic or Latino of any race. 17.4% were of German, 14.8% English, 9.9% Irish and 7.5% Norwegian ancestry. 97.1% spoke only English while 1.0% spoke Spanish at home.

There were 11,645 households, out of which 23.20% had children under the age of 18 living with them, 53.60% were married couples living together, 8.20% had a female householder with no husband present, and 34.90% were non-families. 28.50% of all households were made up of individuals, and 11.70% had someone living alone who was 65 years of age or older. The average household size was 2.21 and the average family size was 2.67.

In the county, 19.80% of residents were under the age of 18, 5.00% from 18 to 24, 21.60% from 25 to 44, 32.50% from 45 to 64, and 21.10% were 65 years of age or older. The median age was 47 years. For every 100 females there were 95.80 males. For every 100 females age 18 and over, there were 94.40 males.

The median income for a household in the county was $37,869, and the median income for a family was $45,415. Males had a median income of $37,210 versus $25,831 for females. The per capita income for the county was $22,211. About 7.20% of families and 11.30% of the population were below the poverty line, including 16.60% of those under age 18 and 6.00% of those age 65 or over.

== Politics ==
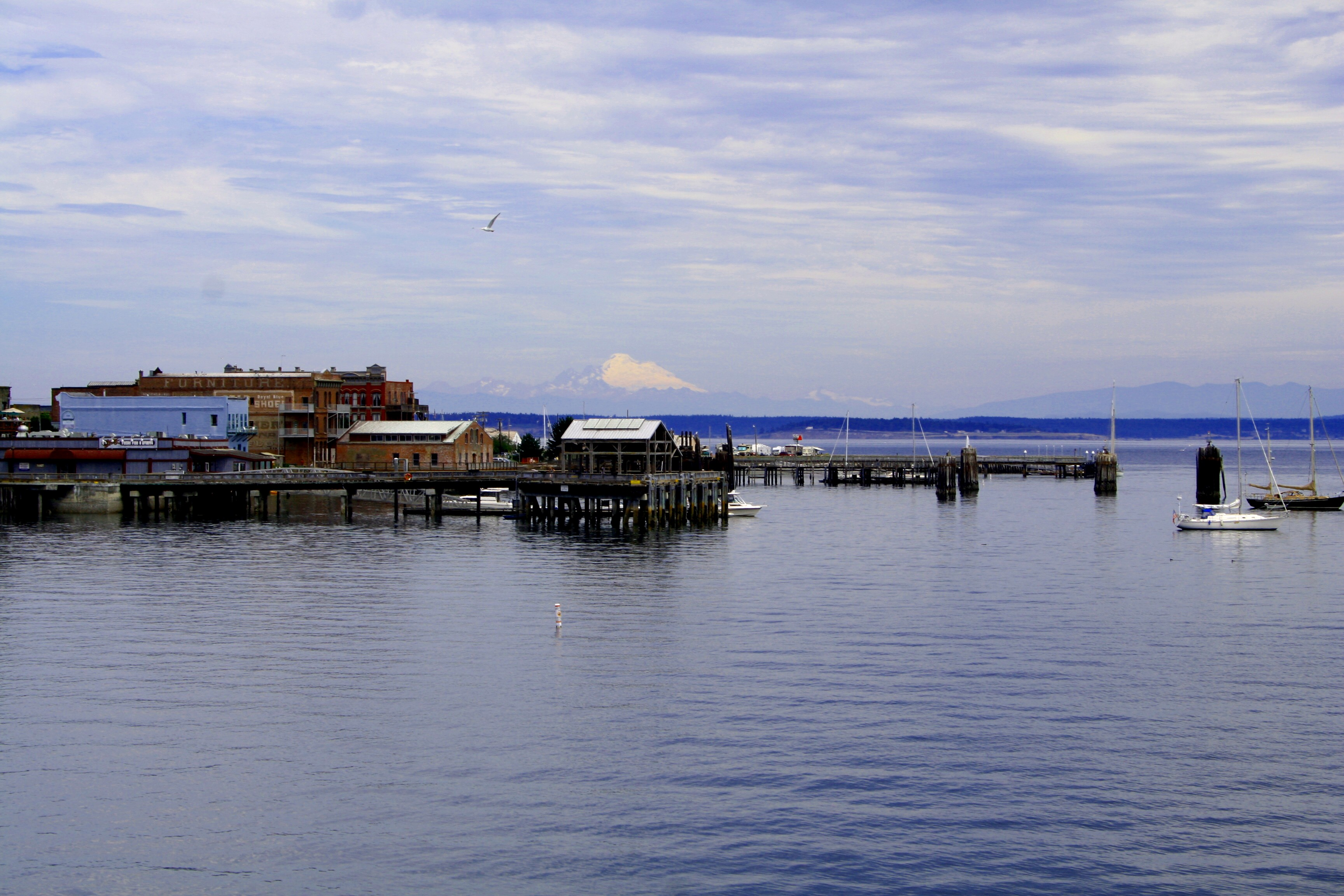
Port Townsend Bay as seen from a ferry

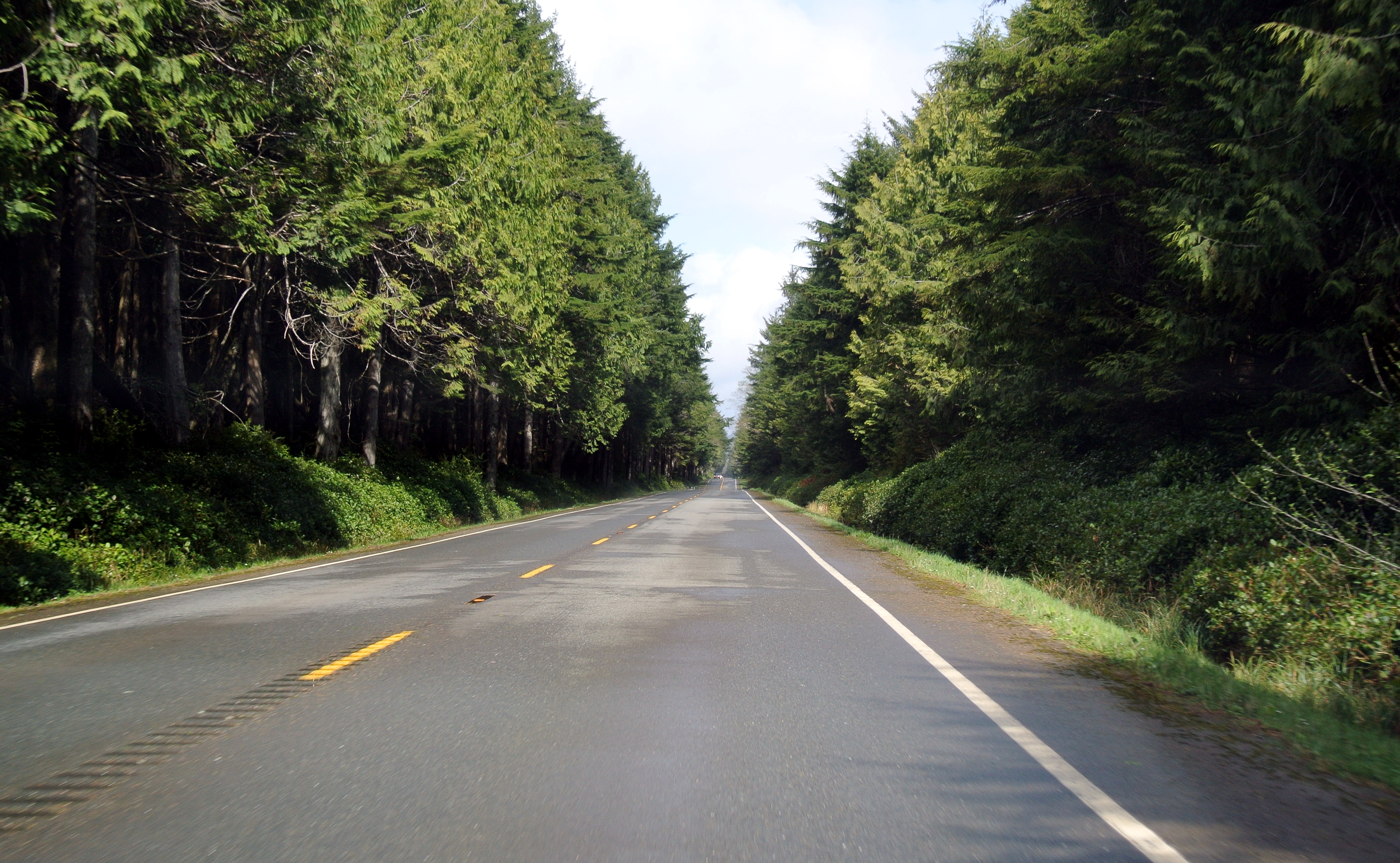
US Route 101 in Jefferson County

Jefferson County is a dominant Democratic area, with Democrats having carried the county in every election cycle since Ronald Reagan's landslide victory in 1980.

In 2024, Democratic nominee Kamala Harris won over 70% of the vote in the county, the highest vote share in its history. The county was one of the few in the country to shift significantly leftward. As of 2024, the county is located in Washington's 6th congressional district and in the 24th of Washington state legislative districts.

Because of the barrier dividing the county, the populations and economies differ between the eastern and western halves of Jefferson County. The contrasts are notable as the west portion is more dependent on logging, somewhat less prosperous, and having fewer people for roughly the same area. Areas of East Jefferson County located south of Port Townsend remain largely rural and can be divided into two parts, those communities located on Hood Canal and those on Admiralty Inlet. Perennial discussions and attempts to separate the west half from the east half gained little support during the twentieth century.

The county seat, Port Townsend, is overwhelmingly Democratic in most elections. It gave Barack Obama 82% of its votes in the 2012 presidential election. Areas outside of Port Townsend (such as Cape George) gave Obama 2-to-1 victory margins. Democrats also draw the most votes in many of the small towns of northern Jefferson County, with strong Democratic leans in Coyle, Discovery Bay, Gardiner, and Nordland, as well as in the towns just southeast of Port Townsend such as Chimacum, Irondale, Kala Point, and Port Hadlock. Democrats also perform strongly in the sparsely populated western part of the county, where much of the population is Native American.

United States presidential election results for Jefferson County, Washington
Year	Republican		Democratic		Third party(ies)	
Year	No.	%	No.	%	No.	%
1892	610	43.85%	665	47.81%	116	8.34%
1896	704	56.32%	536	42.88%	10	0.80%
1900	684	61.73%	392	35.38%	32	2.89%
1904	962	73.60%	283	21.65%	62	4.74%
1908	859	63.16%	417	30.66%	84	6.18%
1912	636	27.34%	642	27.60%	1,048	45.06%
1916	1,094	51.80%	861	40.77%	157	7.43%
1920	1,128	61.57%	322	17.58%	382	20.85%
1924	913	51.79%	143	8.11%	707	40.10%
1928	1,472	63.83%	810	35.13%	24	1.04%
1932	952	29.14%	1,994	61.03%	321	9.83%
1936	1,063	31.04%	2,279	66.54%	83	2.42%
1940	1,540	42.13%	2,083	56.99%	32	0.88%
1944	1,415	43.38%	1,829	56.07%	18	0.55%
1948	1,610	43.80%	1,911	51.99%	155	4.22%
1952	2,355	54.70%	1,933	44.90%	17	0.39%
1956	2,300	56.69%	1,750	43.14%	7	0.17%
1960	2,103	48.83%	2,197	51.01%	7	0.16%
1964	1,432	32.14%	3,012	67.59%	12	0.27%
1968	1,827	40.55%	2,251	49.97%	427	9.48%
1972	2,770	53.49%	2,096	40.47%	313	6.04%
1976	2,794	45.86%	2,913	47.82%	385	6.32%
1980	3,645	44.61%	3,279	40.13%	1,246	15.25%
1984	4,543	48.67%	4,602	49.30%	189	2.02%
1988	4,184	43.42%	5,270	54.69%	182	1.89%
1992	3,467	26.79%	6,148	47.50%	3,327	25.71%
1996	4,607	32.63%	7,145	50.61%	2,367	16.76%
2000	6,095	38.50%	8,281	52.30%	1,457	9.20%
2004	6,650	35.72%	11,610	62.37%	356	1.91%
2008	6,330	31.66%	13,252	66.29%	409	2.05%
2012	6,405	32.30%	12,739	64.24%	685	3.45%
2016	6,037	28.91%	12,656	60.62%	2,186	10.47%
2020	6,931	27.96%	17,204	69.39%	657	2.65%
2024	6,324	25.61%	17,459	70.69%	915	3.70%

== Economy ==
The largest private employer in Jefferson County is the Port Townsend Paper Mill. The largest employer overall (private and public) is Jefferson Healthcare, which operates Jefferson Healthcare Hospital.

== Infrastructure ==
=== Utilities ===
The Jefferson County Public Utility District (PUD) provides electricity to over 23,000 customers in Jefferson County and water to 5,600 customers. It was established in 1939 to construct electrical infrastructure for rural communities and expanded into providing water service in 1981. The PUD began electrical service to the entire county in April 2013 after it had acquired assets and infrastructure from Puget Sound Energy, a private operator, for $103 million. The transfer had been approved by voters in the November 2008 general election after Puget Sound Energy had been sold to an Australian hedge fund.

== Communities ==
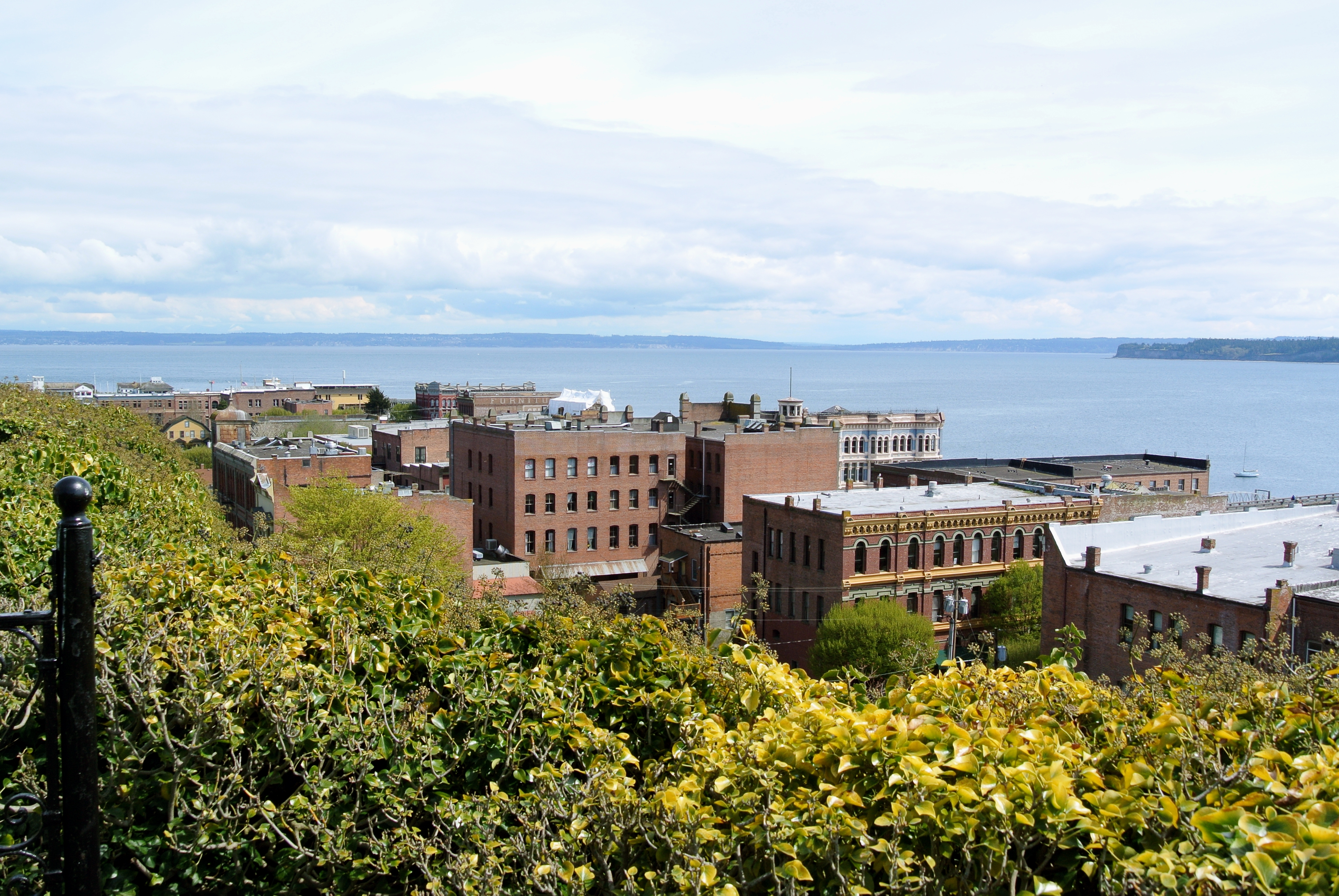
Port Townsend and Admiralty Inlet

=== City ===
- Port Townsend (county seat)

=== Census-designated places ===
- Brinnon
- Marrowstone
- Port Hadlock-Irondale
- Port Ludlow
- Queets (part)
- Quilcene

=== Unincorporated communities ===
- Adelma Beach
- Beckett Point
- Cape George
- Chimacum
- Clearwater
- Coyle
- Crocker Lake
- Dabob
- Discovery Bay
- East Quilcene
- Gardiner
- Glen Cove
- Irondale
- Kala Point
- Kalaloch
- Leland
- Mats Mats
- Oak Bay
- Swansonville

== See also ==
- Heron House
- National Register of Historic Places listings in Jefferson County, Washington
