= Mark Cucuzzella =

American Physician

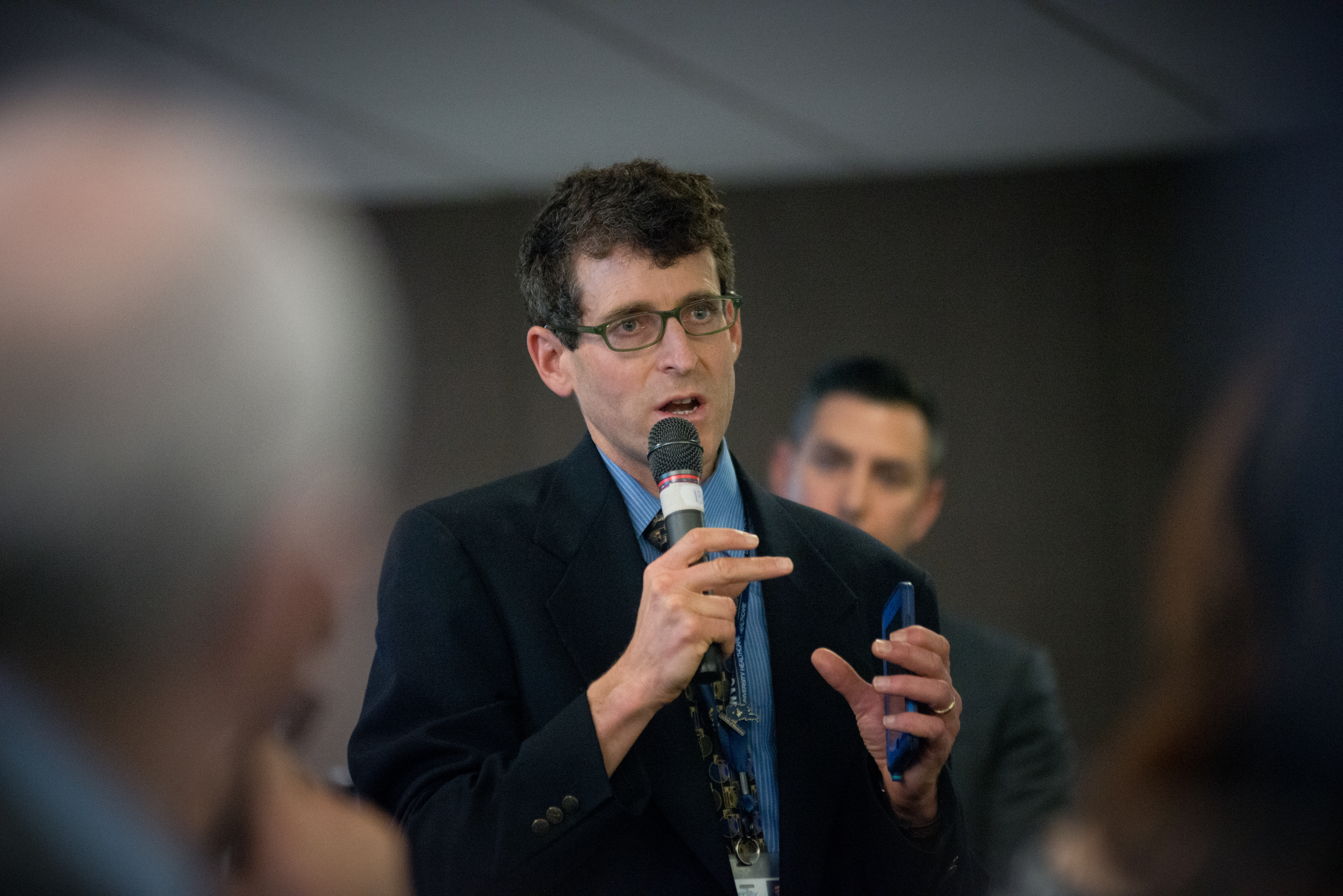
- Born: 1966 (age 59–60)
- Education: University of Virginia; University of Virginia School of Medicine
- Scientific career
- Fields: family medicine obesity medicine community health physical fitness
- Workplaces: Jefferson Healthcare Hospital; West Virginia University; Anschutz Medical Campus

Mark T. Cucuzzella (born 1966) is an American physician known for his contributions to family medicine, obesity medicine, community health, and physical fitness. He served as the Director of the Cardiopulmonary Lab at Jefferson Healthcare Hospital and was a Physician at Martinsburg Veterans Administration Hospital. He holds the position of Professor at West Virginia University School of Medicine. Additionally, Cucuzzella is recognized as a Diplomate of the American Board of Obesity Medicine.

He is a Marine Corps Marathon Hall of Fame inductee.

== Early life and education ==
Cucuzzella attended Loyola High School and was the first runner inducted into their sports Hall of Fame.

He earned his Bachelor of Arts in chemistry from the University of Virginia in 1988 and his Doctor of Medicine degree from the University of Virginia School of Medicine in 1992. He completed his Family Practice Internship and Residency at David Grant USAF Medical Center and Travis Air Force Base California, from 1992 to 1995. Cucuzzella became interested in sports medicine as a runner on the University of Virginia track and cross country teams.

His military service includes positions as a Lieutenant Colonel in the Colorado Air National Guard and as a Staff Family Physician and Flight Surgeon at various military installations, including the United States Air Force Academy, Buckley Air Force Base, and Lajes Field in Portugal.

== Career ==
Cucuzzella currently holds a medical license in West Virginia along with a DEA Certificate. He was a primary care physician for a clinic serving post 9-11 combat veterans at the Martinsburg WV Veterans Administration Hospital. He is certified as a Fellow of the American Academy of Family Physicians and holds Diplomate status with the American Board of Obesity Medicine. He retired as a US Air Force Flight Surgeon. In his previous roles, Cucuzzella held the title of Professor in the Department of Family Medicine at West Virginia University from 2005 to 2023. He also served as the Director of the Cardiopulmonary Lab at Jefferson Healthcare Hospital. Prior to his tenure at West Virginia University, Cucuzzella held various positions, including Lieutenant Colonel in the US Air Force Reserves from 2005 to 2017 and assistant professor at the University of Colorado Health Sciences Center from 2000 to 2005. During his time at the University of Colorado Health Sciences Center, Cucuzzella served as a Family Medicine Hospitalist, delivering comprehensive inpatient care, and later transitioned to the role of Director of Inpatient Service.

After foot surgery in the year 2000 which threatened his running career Cucuzzella became interested in minimal shoes and barefoot running. This was before the height of the minimal shoe and barefoot running movement brought on by the book Born to Run.

== Awards ==
- Paul Harris Fellow Shepherdstown Rotary 2022
- Marine Corps Marathon Hall of Fame 2018
- American Academy of Podiatric Sports Medicine Presidents Award 2018
