= General McGee =

General McGee may refer to:

- Charles McGee (Tuskegee Airman) (1919–2022), U.S. Air Force post-service brigadier general
- Howard S. McGee (1915–2005), U.S. Army major general
- Joseph McGee (general) (fl. 1980s–2020s), U.S. Army major general
