= George Floyd protests in Washington (state) =

- Part of George Floyd protests
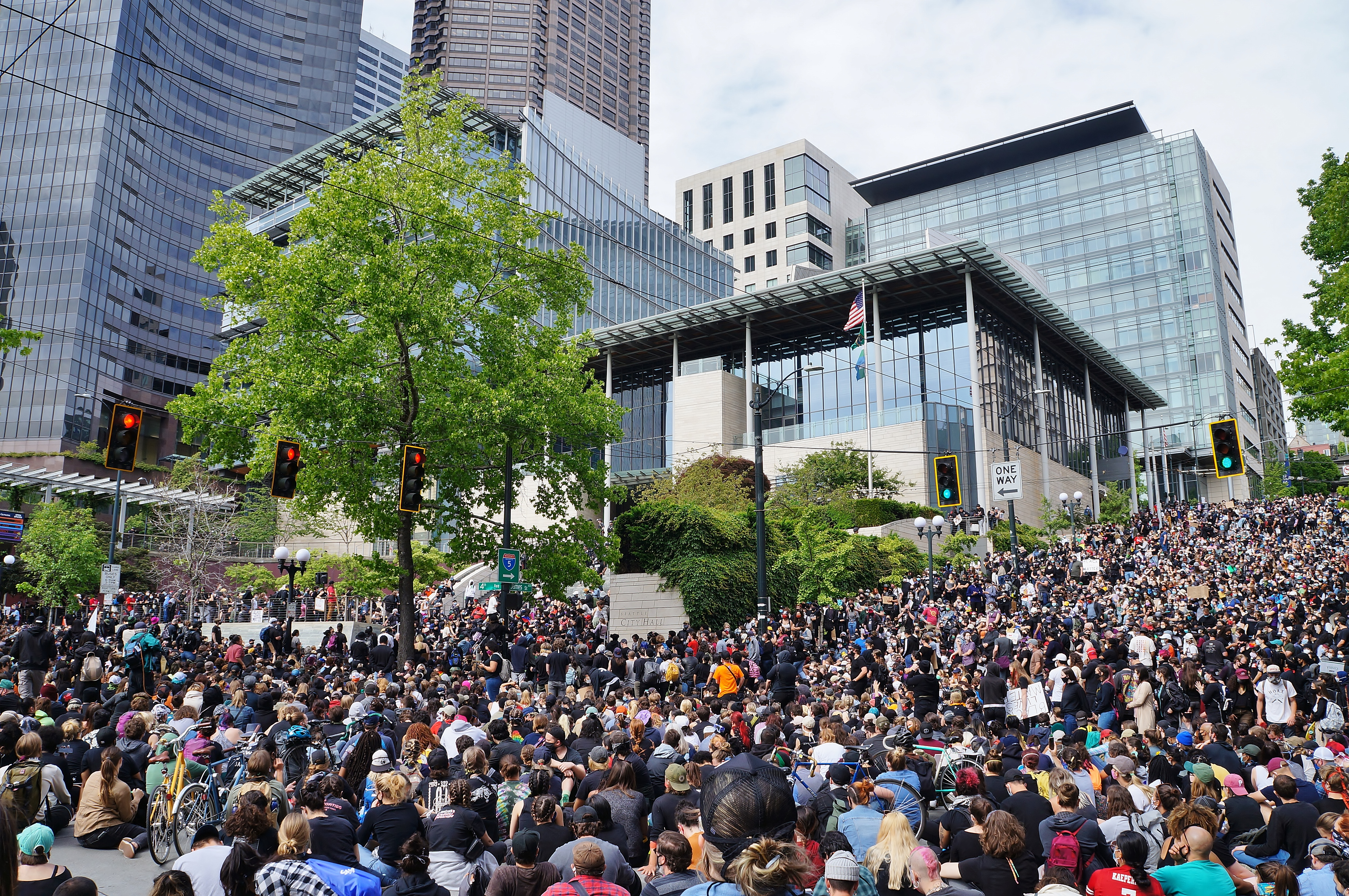
- Protesters at Seattle City Hall on June 3
- Date: May 29 – August 2020 (2 months and 3 days)
- Location: Washington, U.S.
- Caused by: Police brutality; Institutional racism against African Americans; Reaction to the murder of George Floyd; Economic, racial and social inequality

Cities in Washington in which a protest with about 100 or more participants was held

This is a list of protests over the murder of George Floyd that took place in the state of Washington in 2020.

== Protests ==
=== Bellingham ===
On May 29, a vigil occurred at the Bellingham Public Library where a memorial was set up. A march took place in Bellingham the following day. On June 2, a small gathering took place at the library memorial while several hundred protesters gathered at Railroad Avenue and Holly Street.

On June 6, about 7,000 protesters gathered at Maritime Heritage Park.

On June 28, hundreds of protesters marched from Maritime Heritage Park to City Hall commemorating the 51st anniversary of the Stonewall riots and calling on the city to "defund the police." After most protesters had left, a small group remained, taking down and burning the American flags which had flown at City Hall and graffitiing the entrance.

=== Cascades ===
- Chelan: A protest and vigil were held on June 7, starting at Riverwalk Park and moving along the sidewalks downtown. While the protest called for systemic change, the organizers made it clear that the protest was not in opposition to local law enforcement.
- Leavenworth: A 2.5 mile march followed by the singing of "Amazing Grace", and a candlelight 8 minute 46 second moment of silence was observed by 1,300 in the city of Leavenworth, in Chelan County, Washington, on June 5.
- Selah: A number of protests were held throughout June. On June 6, more than 150 people participated in at least one of the protests. Members of City Council were vocal in their opposition to the protests. In early July 2020, protesters wrote "Black Lives Matter" in chalk near City Hall, and held a protest. Police threatened to charge those using chalk with a crime, and then removed parts of it with a pressure washer, while the protesters lay on top of other parts of it to prevent washing.
- Wenatchee: Several hundred people, most of whom wearing masks to prevent the spread of COVID-19, gathered in Memorial Park on the weekend of June 1. On June 6, more than 1,000 protesters gathered in Memorial Park. Armed spectators also gathered and intimidated the crowd after local state legislator Cary Condotta posted on Facebook calling on citizens to be "armed and ready" for the protest.
- Yakima: On June 1, hundreds of people expressed their frustration about George Floyd in the streets of Yakima. On June 3, about 100 protesters gathered for a solidarity demonstration downtown for the fifth straight day.

=== Eastern Washington ===
- Ellensburg: Hundreds of demonstrators attended marches and other events in Ellensburg through the week of June 1. One protest was on June 2, the reported third such march on June 6.
- Moses Lake: About 300 people gathered for a protest and vigil at Paul Lauzier Memorial Athletic Park on June 7.
- Omak: 400-500 people were estimated at a march in downtown Omak on the evening of June 4.
- Pasco: Hundreds gathered at a busy intersection on May 31. Protesters lay in the street for eight minutes then marched to the Pasco Police Station.
- Pullman: About 200 protesters marched from Martin Stadium to city hall on June 12.
- Richland: More than 200 protesters gathered at John Dam Plaza and marched along George Washington Way on May 30.
- Spokane: Over 1,000 people marched in a peaceful protest in Riverfront Park to the Spokane County Courthouse on the afternoon of May 31. After the organized protest concluded, around 200 individuals wandered to congregate at the Federal Building where clashes with police began. A curfew was put in place, and tear gas and rubber bullets were used by the police after the Nike store was looted. Police secured the downtown core shortly before midnight.
- Walla Walla: Hundreds of protesters gathered in downtown Walla Walla on May 31.

=== King County ===
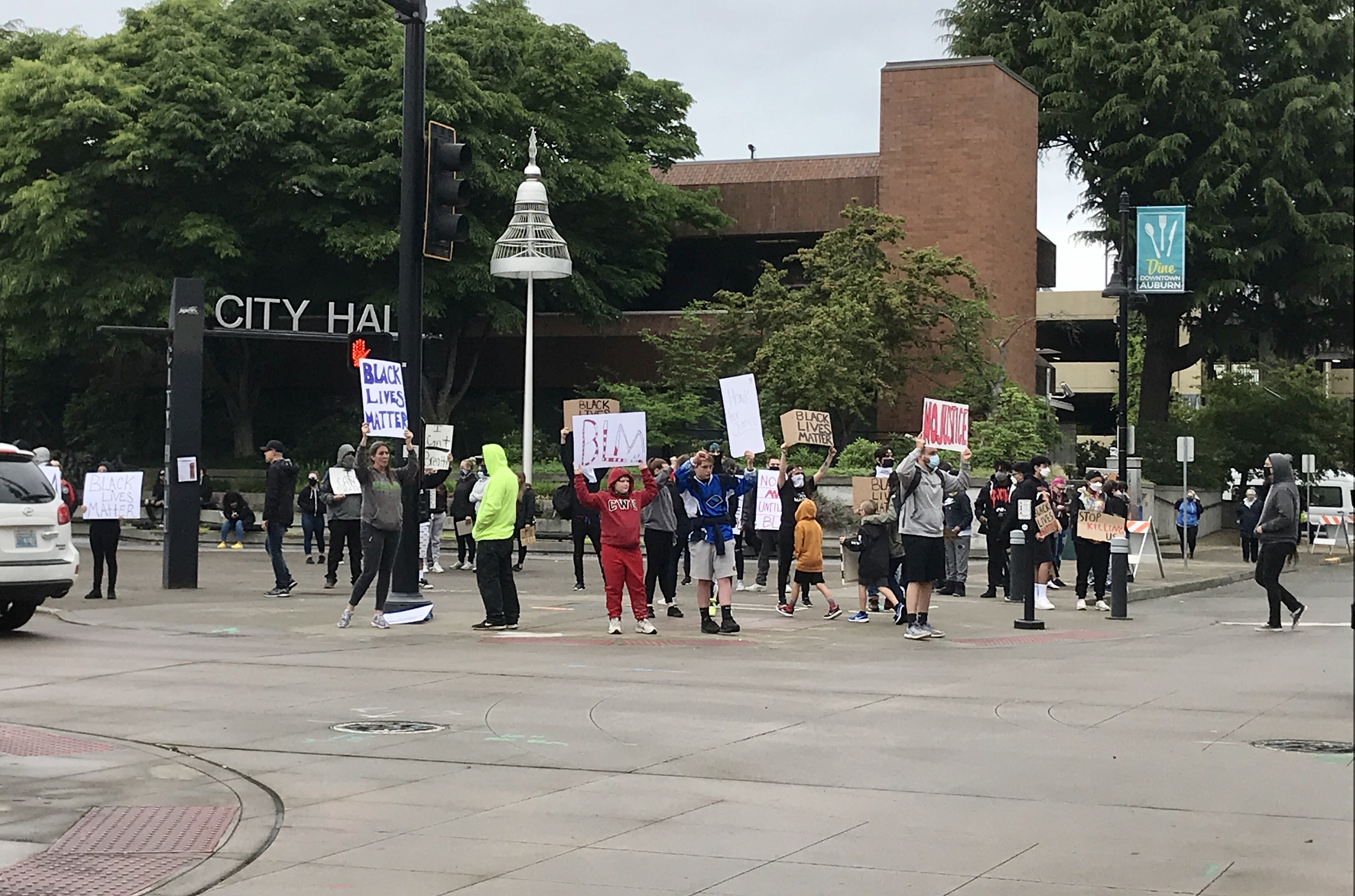
Protesters gather in front of Auburn City Hall on June 2

- Auburn: An estimated 1,000 protesters attended the 'I Can't Breathe' BLM Protest on June 2 in downtown Auburn. Nearly 75 people knelt in protest on June 10 on the sidewalk in front of Thomas Jefferson High School.

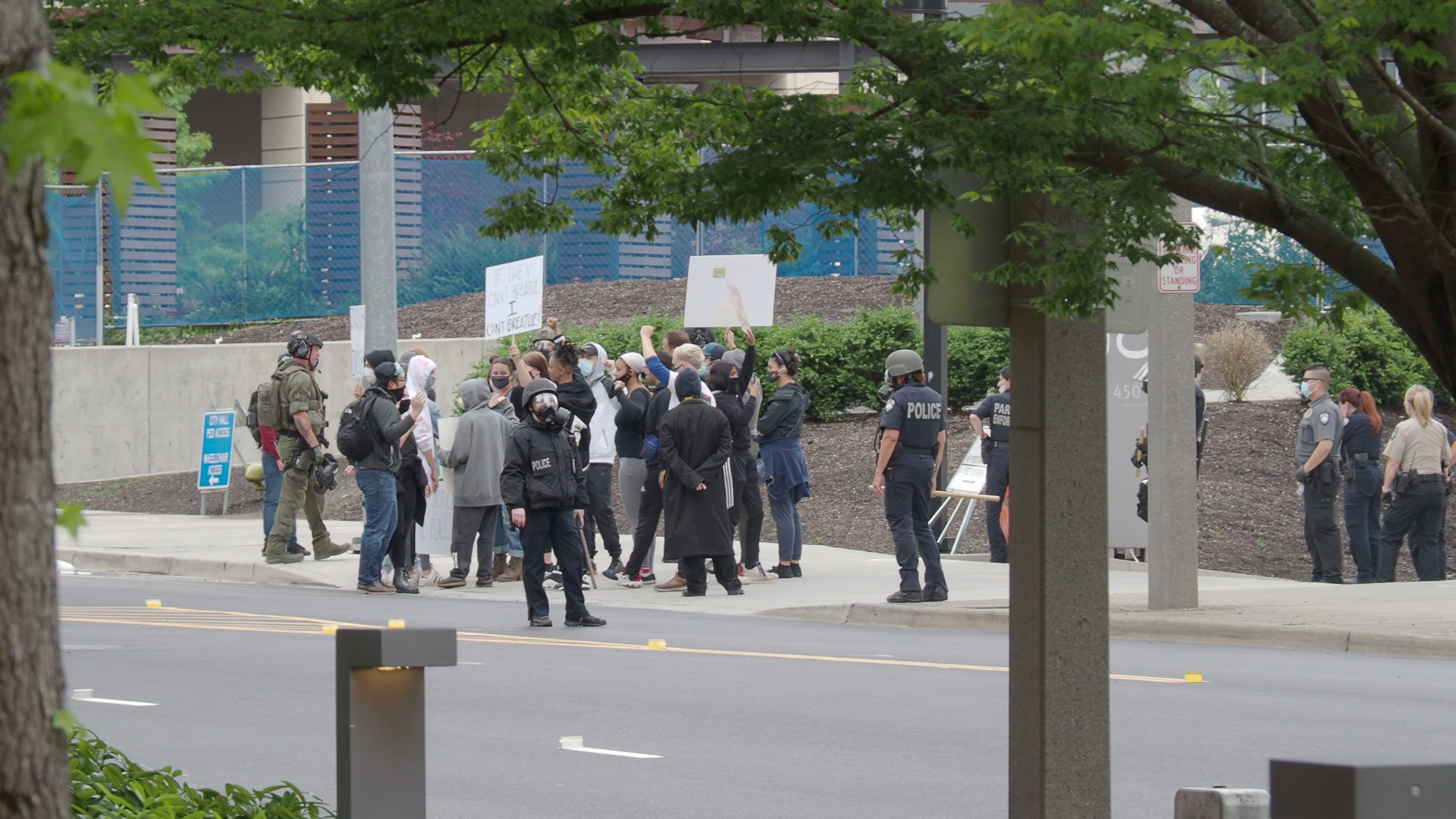
Police and protesters outside City Hall in Downtown Bellevue

- Bellevue: A protest took place on May 31. Seattle television news station KOMO reported "protesters also were smashing windows, looting and throwing projectiles" and Interstate 405 was closed through downtown Bellevue. During the protests, "dozens of people" characterized by local news station KING as "looters" broke into Bellevue Square, the largest shopping mall in Bellevue, which was closed due to the coronavirus pandemic.
- Burien: Between 700 and 1,000 people marched to city hall on June 6.
- Federal Way: More than 200 people marched downtown on May 31 on Pacific Highway wearing masks.
- Issaquah: About 500 residents marched through Olde Town toward City Hall on June 12.
- Kent: A youth protest group organized under the name "ForFortyTwo" to promote defunding the local police department. A group of ForFortyTwo protesters gathered outside the Kent police headquarters on August 17.
- Kirkland: A march of 75 to 100 people through the downtown area on June 1; "about half of all businesses in downtown Kirkland" boarded up their storefronts on Central Way; and "a dozen or so middle aged white men" with semiautomatic rifles were televised on the streets.
- Lake Forest Park: Local activist group Lake Forest Park for Peace resumed their weekly protests on June 6. The group had held weekly protests since 2002 against wars in Afghanistan and Iraq but had gone on hiatus due to the COVID-19 pandemic.
- North Bend: On June 7, at least 400 protesters filled several busy intersections downtown at a protest organized by Stand in Solidarity Snoqualmie Valley.
- Renton: More than 200 people protested peacefully for four hours outside Renton City Hall on June 1. Protesters laid on the ground face down for nine minutes. Firearms including shotguns and semiautomatic rifles were displayed in public during protests in Renton on June 2.
- Shoreline: On June 6, about 4,000 people gathered at Cromwell Park, next to the King County courthouse. Students from the Black Student Union at Shorewood High School gave speeches.
- Snoqualmie: At least 23 protesters gathered in the downtown area on May 30.
- Tukwila: On June 7, more than 50 protesters marched along Interurban Avenue S. from the Tukwila Community Center to the Riverside Inn.
- White Center: Hundreds of people marched from Volunteer Park to the Seattle Police West Precinct on the evening of June 10.

=== Kitsap Peninsula ===
- Belfair: Nearly 100 people marched through Belfair on June 4.
- Bremerton: Protests began in Bremerton on May 31. Hundreds protested at Evergreen Rotary Park on June 8.
- Poulsbo: Hundreds of protesters gathered at the intersection of Highway 305 and Liberty Road on June 2. Among the protesters were Suquamish Tribal Council members and tribal elders. The Suquamish natives carried signs reading "Black Lives Matter" and "Native Lives Matter," following a recent announcement that there would be no charges against a Poulsbo police officer who shot and killed native resident Stonechild Chiefstick on July 3, 2019. Three Suquamish elders who left the protest and went to downtown Poulsbo for a quiet dinner encountered two men carrying military assault rifles patrolling Front Street.
- Silverdale: Protesters gathered along Bucklin Hill Road on June 6. Protesters were confronted by J.J. Meland, a local resident who owns a restaurant on the road where protesters had gathered; he held a taser and asked protesters to leave. Meland later invited the protesters to a community gathering at his restaurant at which he apologized.
- Winslow: Hundreds of demonstrators gathered at the intersection of Highway 305 and Winslow Way on June 4.

=== Olympic Peninsula ===
- Aberdeen: On June 14, about 40 anti-police brutality demonstrators gathered for a protest downtown but were outnumbered by about 100 counter-protesters, many of whom were armed. Protesters reported being harassed, being spat upon and called racial slurs by some of the counter-protesters. One protester claimed a man threatened to shoot her in the face while she called the police for help.
- Forks: On June 7, about 200 people gathered for a protest led by Quileute, Quinault, Hoh, and Klallam natives. This protest was just days after an incident in Forks in which a mixed-race family was followed into the woods and harassed during a camping trip after being mistaken for Antifa.
- Hoquiam: The mayor and police department joined a protest in solidarity with Black Lives Matter on May 31.
- Port Angeles: On June 6, about 600 people gathered in front of the Clallam County Courthouse.
- Port Townsend: On June 5, hospital staff at Jefferson Healthcare took a knee for 8 minutes and 46 seconds and between 100 and 150 Port Townsend High School students gathered in the streets.
- Sequim: On June 5, about 130 people gathered at the Sequim Civic Center for a vigil.

=== San Juan Islands ===
- Eastsound: On May 31, hundreds gathered in Village Green on Orcas Island.
- Friday Harbor: More than 150 islanders gathered on the lawn in front of the San Juan County Courthouse on June 1.
- Lopez Island: On May 31, hundreds gathered in Lopez Village.

=== Skagit Valley ===
- Anacortes: About 80 people gathered to protest on May 30 on Commercial Avenue. At the end of the demonstration protesters blocked a busy intersection and a woman was injured after a man attempted to drive through the crowd. The following weekend, on June 6, several hundred protesters lined the streets.
- Burlington: More than 200 protesters gathered on Burlington Boulevard on June 4. In a parking lot adjacent to the boulevard, onlookers stood by, "one of them well-armed with a large military-style weapon and ammunition in full view" and identifying himself as a member of the Skagit Militia. The militia did not confront protesters and the protest was peaceful.
- Mount Vernon: About 30 people gathered for a rally on the 4th Street Bridge on June 19.

=== Snohomish County ===
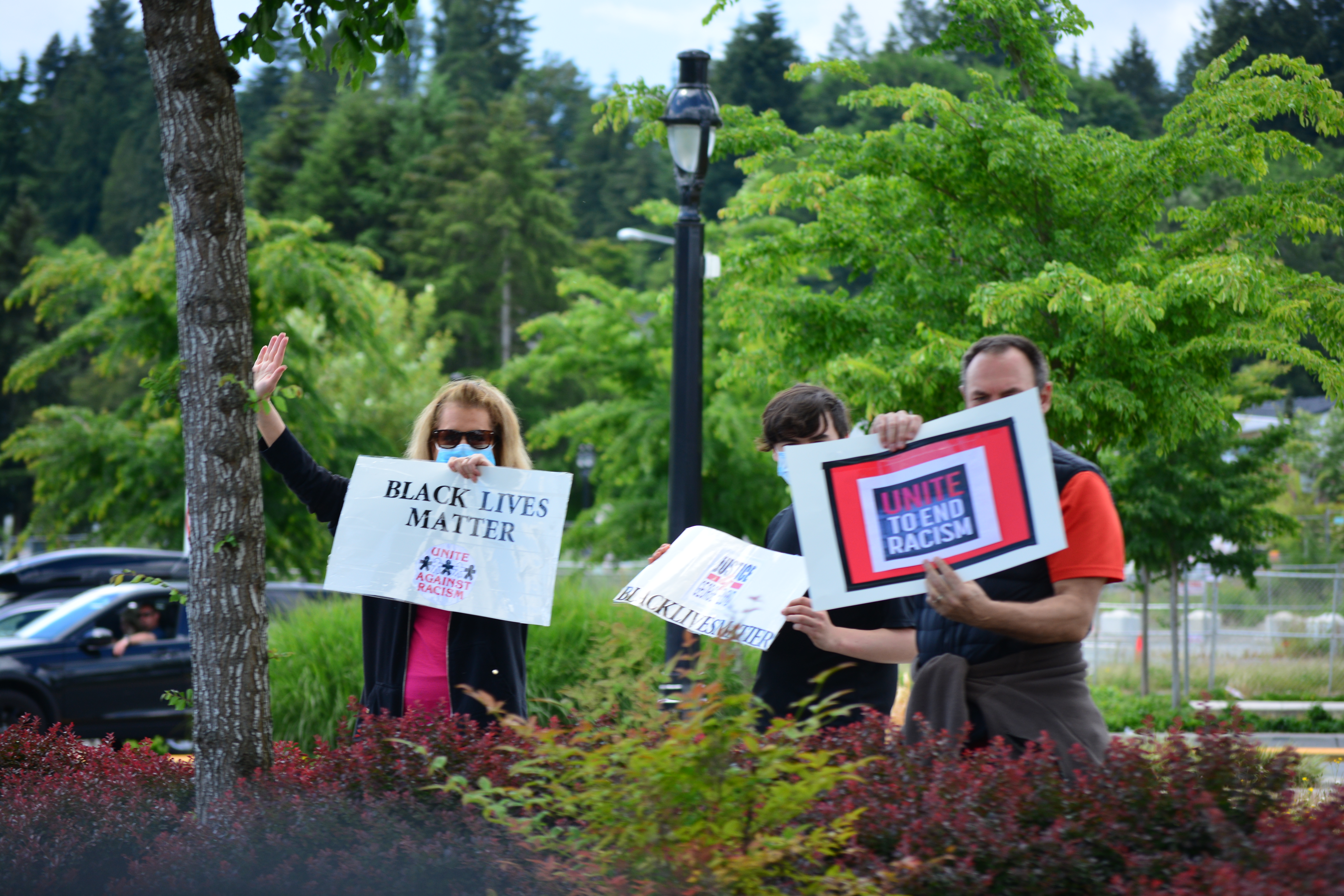
A roadside protest in Bothell on June 6

- Arlington: A crowd of protesters gathered in Legion Park on June 12.
- Edmonds: Small protests were held for several days on Edmonds Way in the Westgate neighborhood of Edmonds. Hundreds of protesters gathered near Meadowdale High School on the evening of June 3. Upwards of 1,000 people marched in a silent protest around Downtown Edmonds on June 12 in solidarity with a simultaneous Black Lives Matter silent protest march. About 250 people marched in a youth-led protest from Brackett's Landing to the Edmonds Historical Museum on August 29; the protest was peaceful but the event was marred when "a white couple walked through without masks and started to push people."
- Everett: On June 6, around 800 protesters marched through the streets towards the Everett Municipal Building, where an eight minute, forty-six second moment of silence was held. A group of black speakers, led by protest organizer Michael Larson, then shared stories about their experiences with racism and rallied in honor of George Floyd.
- Lake Stevens: On June 4, hundreds gathered in Lundeen Park in Lake Stevens. One of the organizers, a senior at Lake Stevens High School, said "I just wanted to do this because Lake Stevens has never really had our community come together like this, especially at this time."
- Lynnwood: Protesters lined the streets near Beverly Elementary School on June 3 for a protest organized by the school's parent–teacher association. Hundreds gathered on June 19 for a protest march in the College Place neighborhood, marching to the Edmonds School District office. The protesters commemorated Juneteenth and called upon the school district to take more initiative in promoting diversity as well as remove police from their schools.
- Marysville: Hundreds of protesters gathered in Jennings Park on June 11 and marched to Ebey Waterfront Park.
- Monroe: On June 4, hundreds gathered on Main Street in Monroe and marched to Lake Tye, where members of the community gave speeches.
- Mountlake Terrace: Between 300 and 400 protesters marched in a silent protest along 52nd Avenue on June 12, during the statewide general strike organized by Black Lives Matter.
- Mukilteo: About 1,000 people attended a protest on June 7 organized by recent graduates of Kamiak High School.
- Snohomish: Local nonprofit group Snohomish for Equity held rallies in town beginning May 25 and by May 30 the rallies drew crowds of more than 200 people. On May 31, after rumors spread of a threat from Antifa, hundreds of armed men gathered in the downtown area, many of whom were affiliated with far right groups and at least one which flew a Confederate flag from his pickup truck. The local police chief described the gathering as "festive" and later resigned after his description of the event drew criticism.
- Stanwood: On May 28 a lone protester, 17-year-old Mercedez Gonzalez, stood in the rain holding a sign calling for an end to police brutality. She continued her protest each day and was met with both support and opposition from the community. On May 31, Gonzalez was attacked with coffee; on June 2 one driver threw hamburger buns at protesters and another waved a gun while driving past them. By June 3 more than 20 people had joined the protest.
- Tulalip Indian Reservation: About 40 people gathered at Quil Ceda Village on May 31.

=== South Puget Sound ===
- Olympia: On May 30, over 150 gathered at the Washington State Capitol. In the days following the protest a fake advertisement circulated around social media titled "Get Paid to be a Professional Anarchist," featuring Antifa symbolism and listing the contact information for the Thurston County Democrats. On June 5, a photograph of an Olympia Police officer posing with a group of armed civilians making a hand gesture associated with the Three Percenters group was shared on Twitter and Facebook. The police department announced it would investigate the photograph, for which Interim Police Chief Aaron Jelcick apologized.
- Tacoma: Hundreds marched in Tacoma on May 30. The Washington National Guard was deployed to protect the City-County building in Tacoma on June 4 through June 8.
- Yelm: About 100 protesters gathered on the evening of June 4 at the intersection of Yelm Avenue and Clark Road. About 60 counter-demonstrators including the mayor gathered for a "Back the Blue" protest and Flag Day celebration on June 14.

=== Southwest Washington ===
- Centralia: About 40 people gathered in George Washington Park on May 31.
- Chehalis: Inspired by the demonstration in nearby Centralia, upwards of 300 people gathered and knelt at the Lewis County Courthouse on June 1. The protests continued the following weekend with about 100 people protesting outside Vernetta Smith Chehalis Timberland Library on June 6.
- La Center: The Oregonian reported a small group of protesters seen on June 14.
- Raymond: More than 100 people gathered on June 12 for a silent protest march for five miles along U.S. Route 101, ending at the courthouse in South Bend.
- Ridgefield: Upwards of 300 people gathered for a protest on June 3.
- Seaview: About 70 people marched from Seaview to Long Beach on June 20, the culmination of four days of protests along Long Beach Peninsula.
- Vancouver: Around a hundred people gathered in Esther Short Park on May 31 for a peaceful protest. Vancouver Police were present as well as at the Vancouver Mall in anticipation of violence, as looting had been reported in nearby Portland, Oregon. About a dozen protesters continued their protest the next day at a roundabout near city hall. About 50 people gathered in Vancouver Central Park calling for racial justice on June 8 at a rally organized by Southwest Washington Communities United for Change. The same day, about a hundred students from Columbia River High School gathered at the corner of Northeast Hazel Dell Avenue and Northeast 99th Street wearing their caps and gowns and chanted "Black lives matter."
- Washougal: A rally for black lives was held on June 6. Across the street from the rally firearms retailer hosted an armed group that was seen in front of the business and on the rooftop. The store denied accusations of racism, citing the store-owner's Vietnamese American heritage.

==== Kevin Peterson Jr. protests ====
On October 29, 2020, Clark County sheriff's deputies fatally shot Kevin E. Peterson Jr., in Hazel Dell, Washington, near Vancouver, resulting in vigils and demonstrations. Hundreds gathered in Hazel Dell for a vigil the evening of October 30 with protesters carrying signs saying “Honk for Black lives. White silence is violence” and “Scream his name,” and confronting right-wing counter-protesters. That night, hundreds of protesters marched through Downtown Vancouver, resulting in property damage and a confrontation with federal agents. At least one person was arrested after the protest was declared an unlawful assembly and a dispersal order was issued by police.

=== Whidbey Island ===
- Langley: The weekly lunch hour protest organized by local group People of Whidbey Elegantly Resisting (POWER) shifted its focus to Black Lives Matter. About 160 people showed up for the protest on June 7 and 98 people showed up on June 14. The weekly protest was previously a general anti-Trump protest, with focuses in support of sanctuary cities, women's rights and gun control.
- Oak Harbor: On May 30, more than 50 protested in dismal weather at the intersection of Highway 20 and Beeksma Drive. On June 6, several hundred protesters attended a rally the following week.

== Government response ==
Washington State Governor Jay Inslee ordered the activation of the Washington National Guard.

As a consequence of the May 30 events, all Seattle-bound service by Washington State Ferries, Kitsap Fast Ferries and the Seattle Water Taxi was suspended, with Colman Dock loading westbound traffic to Bainbridge Island and Bremerton only; many downtown streets were closed and bus service was halted; the Westlake and Pioneer Square light rail stations were also closed by Sound Transit. The Washington State Department of Transportation rerouted Interstate 5 freeway traffic away from Downtown Seattle in a 20-mile detour across the Evergreen Point Floating Bridge and Interstate 90 floating bridges, and through the Eastside.

The Mayor of Bellevue, Lynne Robinson, declared a civil emergency and curfew in Downtown Bellevue on May 31, and requested the governor to mobilize the Washington National Guard to the city.

Police chief Steve Mylett said the looters and rioters had joined a small group of peaceful protesters before they committed their crimes. "They were not there to protest the tragic death of George Floyd. They were there to destroy," said the chief. He explained that officers had learned on Saturday that gang members had planned to "cause trouble" at a planned peaceful protest, adding that he welcomed peaceful protesters.

The protests in Bellevue and elsewhere led to a statewide expansion of the National Guard callup on May 31, previously limited to 600 guardsmen sent to Seattle only. On June 1, the National Guard secured Bellevue Square.

The city of Kirkland issued an official bulletin to businesses asking them to close in the early afternoon, and for citizens to stay away from the downtown area.

Avatar of Donald J. Trump

Donald J. Trump
(@realDonaldTrump)
tweeted:

Radical Left Governor @JayInslee and the Mayor of Seattle are being taunted and played at a level that our great Country has never seen before. Take back your city NOW. If you don’t do it, I will. This is not a game. These ugly Anarchists must be stooped IMMEDIATELY. MOVE FAST!

June 10, 2020

President Donald Trump criticized the response of Governor Jay Inslee and Seattle Mayor Jenny Durkan, claiming that they were ineffective in dealing with protesters, especially regarding the Capitol Hill Autonomous Zone and the Seattle police's abandonment of the East Precinct. Trump threatened to retake the city if local leaders did not reassert their authority. Weeks later, in the early morning of July 1, Mayor Durkan issued an executive order declaring an end to the zone and authorizing police to clear the area. The police cleared the protest zone and retook the East Precinct soon after.

=== Procedural changes ===
The City of Bellevue announced on June 5 it would no longer allow neck restraints.

The Edmonds School District school board voted on June 24 to terminate contracts with the local police department.

=== Curfews ===
On June 1, Lynnwood issued a curfew after tips came in that rioters were planning to loot Alderwood Mall.

The cities of Redmond, Renton and Mercer Island established a curfew for the evening of June 1. The Redmond curfew was rescinded June 2. The Merce Island curfew remained until June 5.

=== Arrests ===
On the morning of June 11, a Tacoma woman was arrested by federal authorities in full SWAT gear for burning 5 police cars during the May 30 riot in Seattle.

At least 23 people were arrested by Spokane police for participating in the May 31 looting in Downtown Spokane. Fifteen of those arrested were arrested on the night of May 31 and at least 8 more were arrested following police investigation.

At least 23 people were arrested in June by Bellevue police for participating in the May 31 riots.

==== Killing of Michael Reinoehl ====
On September 3, in Lacey, Washington, federal authorities attempted to arrest Antifa supporter Michael Reinoehl for the August 29 killing of Aaron Danielson, a right-wing activist associated with Patriot Prayer, during a protest in Portland. During the attempted arrest, Reinoehl was shot and killed by a federal officer.

== See also ==
- Capitol Hill Occupied Protest
- Killing of Manuel Ellis
