= George Floyd protests in Washington =

George Floyd protests in Washington may refer to:

- George Floyd protests in Washington (state)
- George Floyd protests in Washington, D.C.
