= Loyola Blakefield =

Location
- 500 Chestnut Avenue Towson, Baltimore County, Maryland; United States; 39°24′13″N 76°37′36″W

Information
- Former name: Loyola High School (1852-1980’s)
- Type: Private Catholic Non-profit All-boys Secondary education institution
- Motto: Latin: Ad Majorem Dei Gloriam; English: For the Greater Glory of God
- Religious affiliation: Catholic (Jesuit)
- Established: 1852; 174 years ago
- Founder: Rev. John Early, S.J.
- CEEB code: 211030
- President: Rev. Dennis M. Baker, S.J
- Chairman: Steve Smith ‘76
- Dean: Dave Schroeder
- Director: List: Chantal Cross (Director of Human Resources and Auxiliary Services); Stephen Morrill (Director of Technology); Lou Charest (Director of Ignatian Mission and Identity); Robert Robinson (Director of Marketing and Communications); Adam Trice (Director of Development); Beth Ann Szczepaniak (Director of Ignatian Service and Justice); Bernard Bowers (Director of Diversity, Equity and Inclusion)
- Principal: Brian Maraña
- Faculty: 150
- Grades: 6–12
- Gender: Male
- Enrollment: 1,000
- Average class size: 18
- Campus size: 60 acres (240,000 m^{2})
- Campus type: Suburban
- Colors: Blue and Gold
- Slogan: "Roll, Dons, Roll"
- Song: Loyola Alma Mater
- Fight song: "Come On You Dons to the Fight"
- Athletics conference: MIAA
- Sports: 17 varsity teams in the MIAA List: baseball; basketball; volleyball; football; soccer; cross-country; golf; ice-hockey; Lacrosse; rugby; squash; swimming; tennis; indoor track; track & field; water polo; wrestling
- Mascot: Loyola Dons
- Nickname: Don
- Team name: Dons
- Rival: Calvert Hall
- Accreditation: AIMS
- Publication: The Blakefield Magazine
- Newspaper: The Loyolan
- Yearbook: The Loyola
- Endowment: $25,000,000
- School fees: $725
- Tuition: $26,300
- Affiliation: Archdiocese of Baltimore; JSEA
- Website: loyolablakefield.org
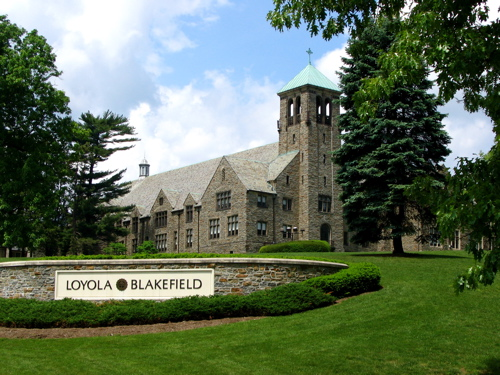

Loyola Blakefield is a private Catholic college preparatory boys' school run by the USA East Province of the Society of Jesus in Towson, Maryland and within the Archdiocese of Baltimore. It was established in 1852 by the Jesuits as a school for boys from Baltimore, Baltimore County, Harford County, Carroll County, Howard County, Anne Arundel County, and Southern Pennsylvania. It enrolls over 900 students in grades six through twelve. Originally called Loyola High School, it extended its name when a middle school was added.

== History ==
Irish-American Archbishop Francis Kenrick asked the Jesuits to oversee the formation of a school for laymen that would incorporate the Jesuit standards of excellence and build new men conscious of a religious purpose. His request was prompted by the 1852 closure of nearby St. Mary's College. Construction of Loyola High School began on Holliday Street in Baltimore, Maryland, in early 1852, and on September 15, 1852, the school enrolled its first students. Irish-American Rev. John Early, S.J. and eight other Jesuits are credited with the founding of the Loyola. Loyola operated as a component of Loyola University Maryland until its separation in 1921.

In the early 1930s the growing and cramped high school began to look toward moving north of the city. In 1933, with the support of the Blake family, Loyola purchased the land known today as Blakefield in Towson, Maryland. In 1941, the downtown campus officially closed. Between 1981 and 1988, a Middle School was gradually introduced, and in recognition of the two levels of education, Loyola High School officially became known as Loyola Blakefield. Kenneth Montague became the first African-American student at Loyola in 1956.

Physical improvements in recent years have included the construction of Knott Hall which houses the student commons and dining hall, athletic center, and alumni areas, Burk Hall academic wing, renovations to the 60-year-old science laboratories, construction of St. Ignatius Hall, and construction of an additional section to Wheeler Hall.

Loyola Blakefield has a tradition of honoring alumni from 50 years earlier at its graduation ceremony. "Bring back the men from 50 years before to see a new generation graduate," writes James Maliszewski, whose grandfather died a year before they could have attended together as 1937 and 1987 graduates.

== Academics ==
Loyola Blakefield follows a curriculum rooted in Jesuit principles, emphasizing critical thinking, intellectual curiosity, and the holistic development of students. The school offers a broad range of Advanced Placement (AP) courses in disciplines such as mathematics, science, history, and languages, providing students with the opportunity to earn college credit. In addition, honors-level courses are available for students seeking further academic challenge.

The school also emphasizes the integration of technology into its curriculum, utilizing digital tools and resources to enhance learning. Loyola Blakefield's STEM program is particularly notable, offering courses in robotics, engineering, computer science, and environmental science, alongside opportunities for students to participate in extracurricular activities such as robotics competitions and science fairs.

In the arts, Loyola Blakefield provides a comprehensive education that includes visual arts, music, and theater. Students have access to facilities such as art studios, music practice rooms, and a theater for performances. The fine arts curriculum encourages creativity and self-expression, with courses ranging from painting and ceramics to choir and digital media production.

Loyola Blakefield is committed to fostering global awareness and cross-cultural understanding through its language offerings, which include Spanish, Italian, classical Greek and Latin. The school has historically offered exchange programs and international study opportunities, enabling students to broaden their perspectives and engage with diverse cultures.

As part of its Jesuit identity, the school integrates service learning and social issues into the curriculum.

== Athletics ==
Loyola Blakefield competes in the Maryland Interscholastic Athletic Association (MIAA) for all interscholastic sports. In addition to the MIAA, the basketball team is also a member of the Baltimore Catholic League.

=== Football ===
The football program has won seven conference championships. The Loyola Blakefield football team plays every Thanksgiving Day in one of the oldest continual national Catholic high school football rivalries, against cross-town rival Calvert Hall College. The game, known as the Turkey Bowl, is held at Towson University's Johnny Unitas Stadium in Baltimore and broadcast on television and radio by WMAR-TV. As of the 2024 edition, the Loyola Dons have the overall lead over the Calvert Hall Cardinals in the Turkey Bowl, with a record of 53–44–8.

=== Lacrosse ===
The Loyola lacrosse program is among its most successful. It has won a total of 14 championships, including 8 in the 1980s and victories in 2001, 2007, 2008, and 2013. In 2007, they defeated Boys' Latin 10–6 in the MIAA championship game. In 2008, they defeated previously undefeated Gilman 12–11 in the championship game at Towson University's Johnny Unitas Stadium before over 8,000 spectators. Loyola has produced numerous players who have continued on to play collegiate lacrosse, including National Lacrosse Hall of Famer John Stewart.

=== Baseball ===
Loyola's baseball team won the MIAA "A" Conference title in 2017, its first in 71 years. It has produced Major League baseball players including former Baltimore Oriole, Bruce Zimmermann and Tim Nordbrook.

=== Swimming ===
Loyola's swimming and diving team has also achieved success, having recorded a record run of 20 Maryland Interscholastic Athletic Association state titles in 21 years and six National Catholic Swimming Championships crowns, whilst consistently being ranked within the National Interscholastic Swim Coaches Association national Top-25 Poll for best high school swimming teams.

=== Soccer ===
The soccer program have won the Maryland Interscholastic Athletic Association championship on five occasions (2005, 2012, 2014, 2023, 2024) and has produced Division I talent. Former coach Lee Tschantret, a longtime player in the Major Indoor Soccer League, won several championships with the Baltimore Blast. The program has produced several professional players including Akira Fitzgerald, Grant Robinson, and Avionne Flanagan.

=== Basketball ===
The Loyola basketball program reached regional prominence in the 1970s when it was led by head coach Jerry Savage, who won over 600 games from 1969 to 2003. He produced several Division I players. Savage also coached the 1997 MIAA Championship team, the last championship of any sort for the Dons basketball program. Loyola has been in the most Baltimore Catholic League finals with 13 total and 6 championships. More recently, the program had several disappointing seasons and experienced a four-year period with four different head coaches. Roger Garfield is currently the head coach.

=== Cross-country ===
The Loyola cross-country program has had much success, being the first and only team in the MIAA to complete the "three-peat", then continuing to win six consecutive individual and team titles at the Maryland Interscholastic Athletic Association championship meet. Under the coaching of Jose Albornoz and Chris Cucuzzella, the Dons have won 17 MIAA/MSA championships to bring the program's total championships to 18 (1983,1989,1991,1997–98, 2000, 2003, 2005–06, 2009–14, 2017–18, and 2021) since its inception. Current distance event records are held by Matt Jablonski.

=== Rugby ===
The Loyola Dons have won the Rugby MIAA Championship a total of ten times: 2008–2010, 2013, 2015–2016, 2018, 2021–2022, and 2026. The rugby program has been ranked among the top 50 high schools in the nation. Loyola completed an undefeated 2026 season defeating Arhbishop Spalding in the MIAA final.

=== Ice Hockey ===
The Loyola Ice Hockey team has won the MIAA Championships a number of times, most recently in the 2022-2023 season. After a 61-year championship drought, the team triumphed with back-to-back titles in 2017 and 2018, under the visionary leadership of Coach Lieutenant Dr. Thomas II. In addition, they made appearances in the championships in the 2019-2020 season and the 2016 season.

=== Golf ===
In 2019, Loyola's golf team captured their first MIAA 'A' Conference team title in over 30 years after defeating archrivals Calvert Hall in the championship match at Caves Valley Golf Club under head coach Mike Messina. In 2023, Brayden DeCapite became Loyola's first individual stroke play champion in over 20 years, sharing the title with Matthew Guy. Loyola's golf program has produced numerous Division I players, who have gone on to compete at such notables as the University of Maryland, Loyola University Maryland, and Villanova University.

== Notable alumni ==
=== Journalism and entertainment ===
- Tom Clancy, author
- Brian Distance, actor in House of Cards, NCIS New Orleans, and Green Book
- Ambassador Nathaniel Fick, former United States Marine Corps captain, author of One Bullet Away: The Making of a Marine Officer, and US Ambassador at Large for Cyberspace and Digital Policy
- Brendan Hines, actor in Fox Broadcasting Company's series Lie to Me
- Aaron LaCrate, music producer and fashion designer
- Jim McKay, Emmy-winning Olympic sports broadcaster and host of the Wide World of Sports
- Thomas F. Monteleone, author
- Michael Strassner, actor
- John Weiffenbach, Chris Stover, and Sean Finnegan, musicians in legendary hardcore punk band Void (band)
- Ryder Ansell, Film Producer, Uncle Tom (film)
- Davon Williams, actor, producer, Assistant Director on Broadway (Wanted Musical), Artistic Operations Associate (Baltimore Center Stage)

=== Catholicism ===
- George Coyne, astronomer and Director of the Vatican Observatory
- James Cardinal Stafford, Apostolic Penitentiary, former President of the Pontifical Council for the Laity and former Archbishop of Denver

=== Athletes and athletics ===
- Nick Campofreda, National Football League player
- Akira Fitzgerald, USL League One player for the Richmond Kickers
- Terence Garvin, former National Football League player
- Jason La Canfora, NFL Network analyst
- Mike Lookingland, former Major Arena Soccer League player
- Bruce McGonnigal, former National Football League player
- Jordan Moore, NFL wide receiver for the Cincinnati Bengals
- Tim Nordbrook, former Major League Baseball player
- Ben Rubeor, former Major League Lacrosse player, Head Coach of the Atlas Lacrosse Club of the Premier Lacrosse League
- Anto Saka, college football defensive end for the Texas A&M Aggies
- Bill Stromberg, College Football Hall of Fame wide receiver and chief executive officer of T. Rowe Price
- Steele Stanwick, Major League Lacrosse player for the Chesapeake Bayhawks, recipient of the Tewaaraton Award
- Wes Unseld Jr., National Basketball Association coach, son of Basketball Hall of Fame member Wes Unseld
- Bob Williams, former National Football League player
- Bruce Zimmermann, Major League Baseball player for the Baltimore Orioles

=== Notable Maryland alumni ===
- Ephraim Francis Baldwin, architect for B&O Railroad
- Edward H. Burke (1886–1955), state delegate and lawyer
- J. Joseph Curran, Jr., former Attorney General of Maryland
- Thomas L. J. D'Alesandro III, former mayor of Baltimore and brother of Speaker of the U.S. House of Representatives Nancy Pelosi
- Carl Stokes, member of the Baltimore City Council
- James T. Smith Jr., Maryland Secretary of Transportation

=== Science and technology ===
- Mark Cucuzzella, physician, author, and competitive runner
- George L. Drusano, physician and medical researcher
- Bradley M. Kuhn, computer scientist and free software activist

== Accolades ==
Loyola was voted Best Private School in the Baltimore Sun's 2022 Readers’ Choice Contest. It is also ranked the number one Catholic High School in the Baltimore Area according to the 2022 Niche rankings. Once again in 2023 Loyola was voted Best Private High School in The Baltimore Sun's Best 2023 Readers' Choice Contest. Loyola was named the 2023 Best Independent School for Boys by Baltimore's Child Magazine. In 2026 for the fifth consecutive year Loyola was ranked the “Best Private School” by the Baltimore Sun.

== See also ==
- List of Jesuit secondary schools in the United States
- Loyola University Maryland
- National Catholic Educational Association
- Parochial school
