= National Board of Physician Nutrition Specialists =

Nonprofit organization that certifies physicians practicing nutrition medicine

- Abbreviation: NBPNS
- Founded: 1997; 29 years ago
- Legal status: Nonprofit organization
- President: Zhaoping Li
- Vice president: Doron Kahana
- Website: nbpns.org

The National Board of Physician Nutrition Specialists (NBPNS) is a nonprofit organization that certifies physicians practicing nutrition medicine. Established in 1997, NBPNS maintains credentialing standards, examination assessments, and offers certification for physician nutrition specialists. Eligibility requires completion of a recognized nutrition fellowship program, sufficient continuing medical education (CME), or comparable training. The NBPNS is affiliated with the American Society for Nutrition. Member societies include: the American Society for Parenteral and Enteral Nutrition, the American Association of Clinical Endocrinologists, American Society for Clinical Nutrition, North American Association for the Study of Obesity, American College of Nutrition, American Gastroenterological Association, and the Canadian Society for Clinical Nutrition.

== History ==
The National Board of Physician Nutrition Specialists was founded in 1997 by a coalition of nutrition societies called the Intersociety Professional Nutrition Education Consortium (IPNEC). In 2001, nutrition fellowship programs were established.

== Fellowship programs ==
Several fellowships are offered, which result in eligibility for board certification. Fellowships are offered at the following institutions:

- Boston University
- Brigham and Women’s Hospital
- Children’s Hospital of Philadelphia
- Cleveland Clinic
- Clinical Fellowship in Clinical Nutrition and Bariatric Medicine
- Columbia University Medical Center
- Geisinger Health System
- Massachusetts General Hospital
- Memorial-Sloan Kettering Cancer Center
- University of California at Los Angeles
- University of Chicago
- University of Colorado

== See also ==
- American Board of Medical Specialties
- American Board of Obesity Medicine
