= Port Townsend Wooden Boat Festival =

Yearly beginning festive in America

The Port Townsend Wooden Boat Festival is held at the beginning of fall every year in Port Townsend, Washington. It is one of the biggest gatherings of wooden boats, their builders and enthusiasts in the world.

== Origins ==
The first Port Townsend Wooden Boat Festival was held in 1977 in Port Townsend, Washington. Founders were Sam Connor and Mary Kearn. Tim Synder and Gail Glassen were most helpful in organizing the show.
