= American Board of Obesity Medicine =

Organization certifying physicians specializing in obesity medicine

- Abbreviation: ABOM
- Founded: 2011; 15 years ago
- Legal status: 501(c)(3) nonprofit organization
- Headquarters: 2696 S Colorado Blvd. Suite 340; Denver, CO 80222
- Coordinates: 39.669°N 104.940°W
- Chairman: John Cleek
- Website: www.abom.org

The American Board of Obesity Medicine (ABOM) is a 501(c)(3) nonprofit, self-appointed physician-evaluation organization that certifies physicians practicing obesity medicine. The American Board of Obesity Medicine is not a membership society, educational institution, or licensing body. Certification is intended to signify that a physician possess specialized knowledge of obesity. Eligibility requires completion of a recognized fellowship program or sufficient continuing medical education (CME).

== History ==
The American Board of Obesity Medicine was established in 2011 by the American Board of Bariatric Medicine (ABBM) and the Certified Obesity Medicine Physician (COMP) steering committee. In 2012, the first certification examinations were offered. The certification examination is offered annually. As of 2021, 5,424 physicians were board certified by the ABOM.

== See also ==
- American Board of Medical Specialties
- National Board of Physician Nutrition Specialists
