= Port Townsend, Washington =

City in Washington, United States

Port Townsend
- City
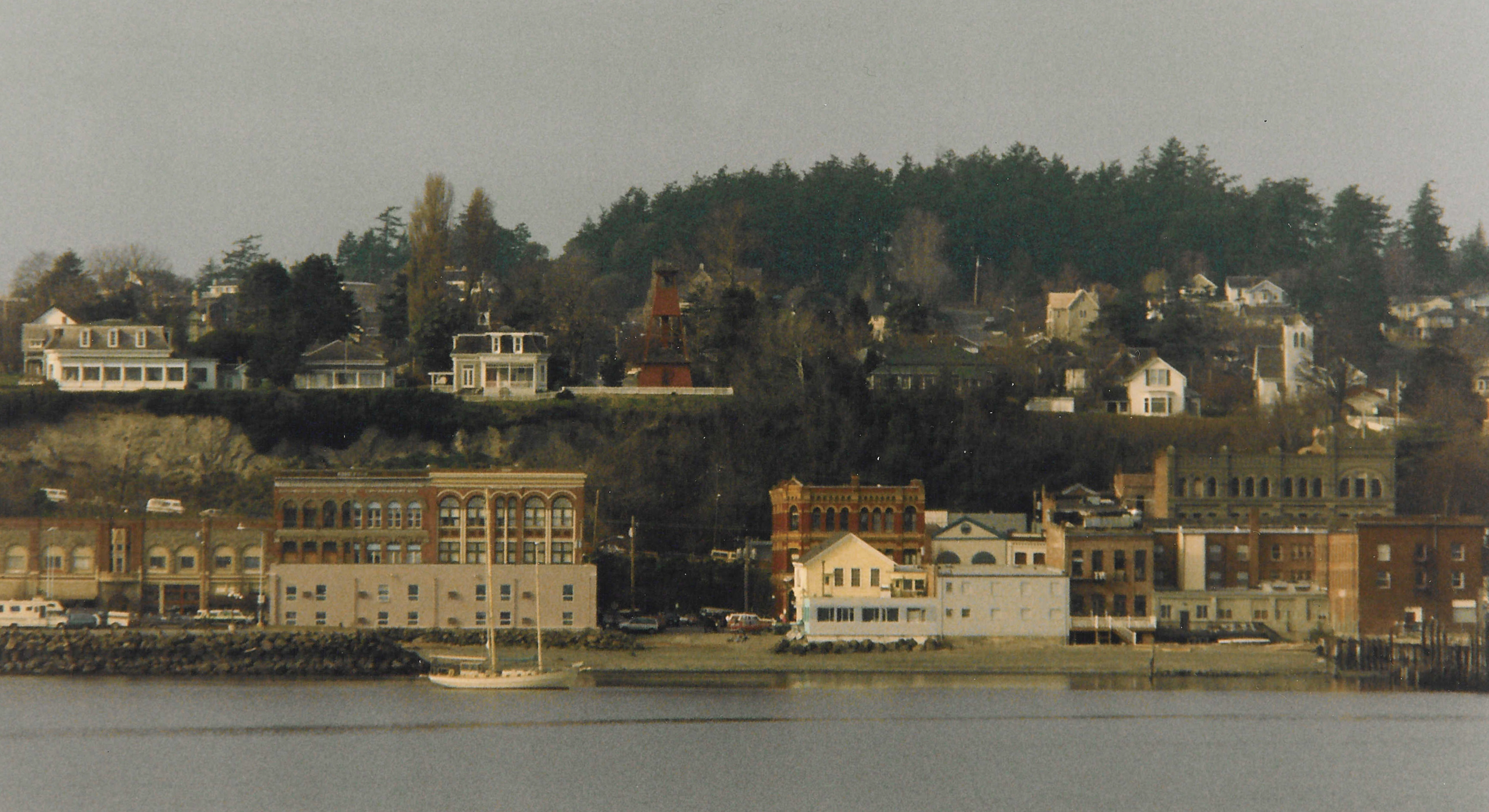
- Downtown Port Townsend, seen from the water
- Interactive location map of Port Townsend
- Coordinates: 48°6′55″N 122°45′43″W
- Country: United States
- State: Washington
- County: Jefferson
- Incorporated: 1851

Government
  - Type: Council–manager
  - Mayor: Amy Howard
  - City Manager: John Mauro

Area
  - Total: 7.36 sq mi (19.05 km^{2})
  - Land: 6.94 sq mi (17.98 km^{2})
  - Water: 0.41 sq mi (1.07 km^{2})
- Elevation: 154 ft (47 m)

Population (2020)
  - Total: 10,148
  - Density: 1,416.1/sq mi (546.75/km^{2})
- Time zone: UTC−8 (Pacific (PST))
  - Summer (DST): UTC−7 (Pacific Daylight Time)
- ZIP Code: 98368
- Area code(s): 360, 564
- FIPS code: 53-55855
- GNIS feature ID: 2411468
- Website: www.cityofpt.us

Port Townsend /ˈtaʊnzənd/ is a city on the Quimper Peninsula in Jefferson County, Washington, United States. The population was 10,148 at the 2020 United States Census. It is the county seat of, and the only incorporated city in, Jefferson County.

In addition to its natural scenery at the northeast tip of the Olympic Peninsula, the city is known for the many Victorian buildings remaining from its late 19th-century heyday, numerous annual cultural events, and as a maritime center for independent boatbuilders and related industries and crafts. The Port Townsend Historic District is a U.S. National Historic Landmark District. It is also significantly drier than the surrounding region due to being in the rainshadow of the Olympic Mountains, receiving only 19 inches or 480 millimeters of rain per year.

== History ==
The bay was originally named "Port Townshend" by Captain George Vancouver in 1792, for his friend the Marquis of Townshend. It was immediately recognized as a good safe harbor, although strong south winds and poor holding ground often make small-craft anchorage problematic off the town's waterfront.

The official founding of the American city of the same name took place on April 24, 1851. Indian tribes located in what is now Jefferson County in the mid-19th century included the Chimakum (or Chemakum), Hoh (a group of the Quileute), Klallam (or Clallam), Quinault, and Twana (the Kilcid band — Anglicized as "Quilcene").

Port Townsend is called the "City of Dreams" because of the early speculation that the city would be the largest harbor on the west coast of the United States. Guarding the gate of Puget Sound, it would become known by its other nickname, the "Key City," a title that remains to this day.

By the late 19th century, Port Townsend was a well-known seaport, very active and banking on the future. Many homes and buildings were built during that time, with most of the architecture ornate Victorian. During this period, in 1888, the Port Townsend Police Department was established.

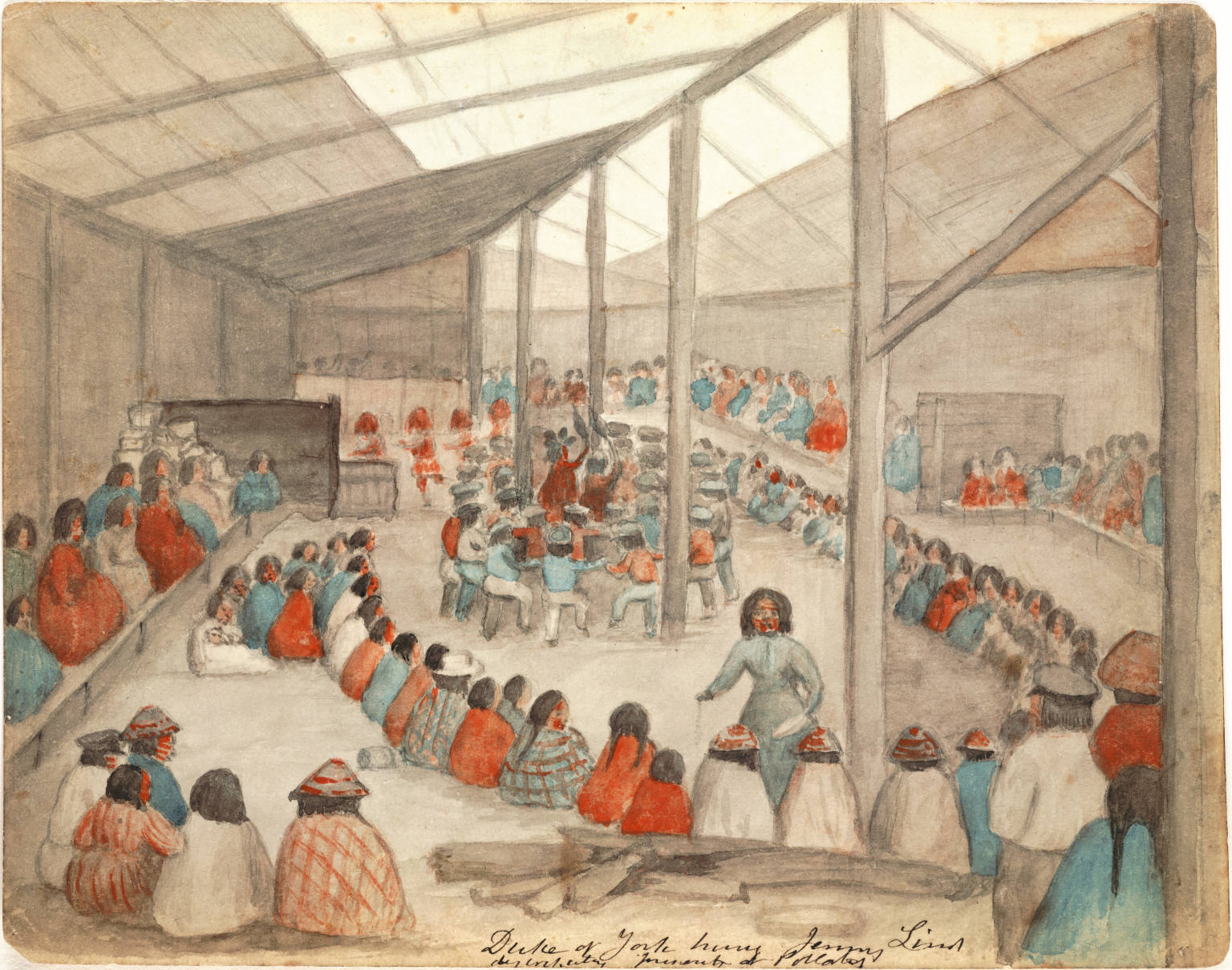
Klallam people during a Potlatch at Port Townsend, 1859, by James G. Swan

Railroads were built to reach more areas in the 1870s–1890s, and Port Townsend was to be the northwest extension of the rail lines. Its port was large and frequented by overseas vessels, so shipping of goods and timber from the area was a major part of the economy. Many of the buildings were built on the speculation that Port Townsend would become a booming shipping port and major city. When the depression hit, those plans lost the capital to continue and rail lines ended on the east side of Puget Sound, mainly in Tumwater, Tacoma, and Seattle. With the other Puget Sound ports growing in size, Port Townsend saw a rapid decline in population when the Northern Pacific Railroad failed to connect the city to the eastern Puget Sound city of Tacoma. By the late 1890s, the boom was over. Without the railroad to spur economic growth, the town shrank and investors looked elsewhere to make a good return. (The Milwaukee Road built a short spur to the pulpmill and barged cars over from Anacortes.)

Over the decades that followed, Port Townsend maintained its economic stability in a variety of ways, including the development of artillery fortifications at Fort Worden. Many people left the area, and many buildings were abandoned. Port Townsend's economy was very weak until the 1920s, when a paper mill was built on the edge of the town. The bay is now home to Naval Magazine Indian Island, the US Navy's primary munitions-handling dock on the Pacific coast.

Since the 1970s new residents, including many retirees, have moved to town. The waterfront retail district has restaurants, services, and tourist destinations. Since 1999, the city has had an annual international film festival in September. Other cultural programming, some at Fort Worden, now a state park, includes a Wooden Boat Festival, writers' conference, playwrighting festival, and blues and jazz festivals, in addition to music, dance, and live theater performances. The town has two independent movie theaters, both upgraded by 2014 to handle digital film.

=== Recognition of historic status ===
Because of the speed at which the economy declined in the 1890s and the lack of any industry to replace it, very few of the Victorian buildings were torn down or built over in the intervening period. They were essentially preserved for nearly 100 years, when the value of protecting them was appreciated and fostered. Unlike most cities in the Pacific Northwest that were ravaged by natural and man-made disasters such as fire and earthquakes, prominent examples of public, private, and business buildings from nearly every period of Port Townsend's history have survived to the present day.

The Port Townsend Historic District, an area including many Victorian-era buildings, was listed on the National Register of Historic Places in 1976. It was designated a National Historic Landmark in 1977.

== Geography ==
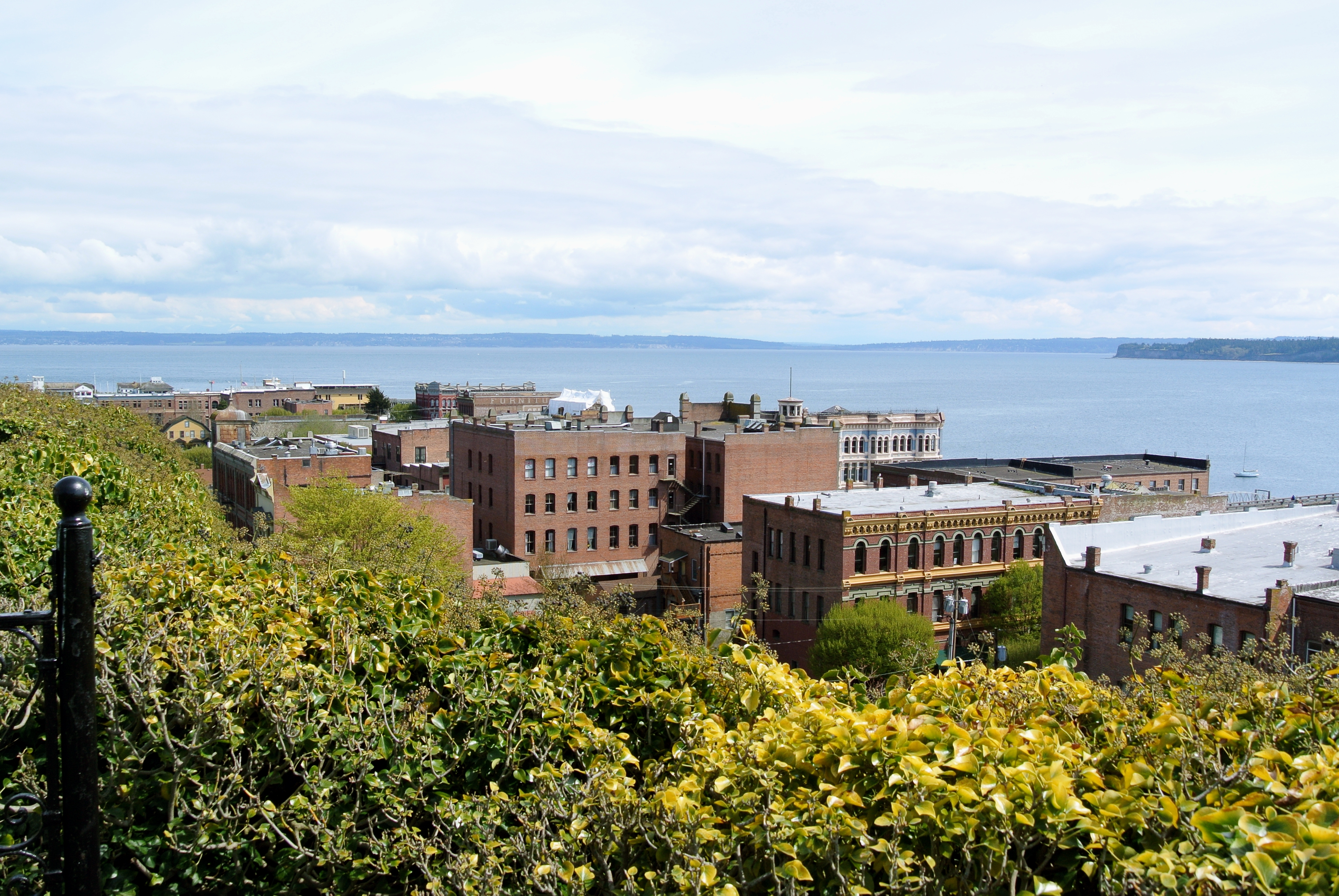
Port Townsend, Admiralty Inlet and Port Townsend Bay

Port Townsend is located on the Quimper Peninsula which extends out of the extreme northeastern end of the Olympic Peninsula, on the north end of a large, semi-protected bay. Port Townsend is adjacent to the Admiralty Inlet and a trio of state parks built on retired artillery installations (Fort Worden, Fort Casey, and Fort Flagler). The city and its surroundings are well-treed, with large Douglas fir dominant over many other tree species in the remaining wooded areas.

According to the United States Census Bureau, the city has a total area of 9.46 square miles (24.50 km^{2}), of which 6.98 square miles (18.08 km^{2}) are land and 2.48 square miles (6.42 km^{2}), or 26.22%, are water.

=== Environment and ecology ===
A non-binding resolution was passed by the city council in 2022 declaring that a local sub-group of killer whales, known as the Southern resident orcas, have rights of nature and should be protected due to the orca's significant "cultural, spiritual, and economic" value to the state and its citizens. The U.S. government has exclusive jurisdiction more than three miles offshore.

=== Climate ===
Port Townsend has a moderate Mediterranean climate with damp, chilly (though not severe) winters and warm, dry summers. It lies in the Olympic rain shadow and receives an average of only 19.04 inches (483.6 mm) annual precipitation. However, the environment is not as dry as the mean yearly total would suggest; cool breezes and fog from the Juan de Fuca Strait provide a comfortable level of humidity.

Climate data for Port Townsend, Washington
| Month | Jan | Feb | Mar | Apr | May | Jun | Jul | Aug | Sep | Oct | Nov | Dec | Year |
|---|---|---|---|---|---|---|---|---|---|---|---|---|---|
| Record high °F (°C) | 62 (17) | 65 (18) | 74 (23) | 76 (24) | 90 (32) | 100 (38) | 100 (38) | 96 (36) | 90 (32) | 75 (24) | 68 (20) | 67 (19) | 100 (38) |
| Mean daily maximum °F (°C) | 46.4 (8.0) | 48.6 (9.2) | 52.1 (11.2) | 57.5 (14.2) | 63.1 (17.3) | 67.9 (19.9) | 72.6 (22.6) | 73.1 (22.8) | 68.0 (20.0) | 58.2 (14.6) | 50.1 (10.1) | 45.3 (7.4) | 58.6 (14.8) |
| Mean daily minimum °F (°C) | 38.4 (3.6) | 38.3 (3.5) | 40.3 (4.6) | 43.2 (6.2) | 47.2 (8.4) | 51.0 (10.6) | 53.0 (11.7) | 53.5 (11.9) | 51.0 (10.6) | 46.3 (7.9) | 41.3 (5.2) | 38.4 (3.6) | 45.2 (7.3) |
| Record low °F (°C) | 5 (−15) | 7 (−14) | 19 (−7) | 27 (−3) | 28 (−2) | 33 (1) | 33 (1) | 37 (3) | 35 (2) | 22 (−6) | 12 (−11) | 5 (−15) | 5 (−15) |
| Average precipitation inches (mm) | 2.24 (57) | 1.61 (41) | 1.85 (47) | 1.53 (39) | 1.52 (39) | 1.37 (35) | 0.73 (19) | 0.54 (14) | 1.10 (28) | 1.64 (42) | 2.43 (62) | 2.58 (66) | 19.14 (489) |
| Average snowfall inches (cm) | 0 (0) | 0.2 (0.51) | 0 (0) | 0 (0) | 0 (0) | 0 (0) | 0 (0) | 0 (0) | 0 (0) | 0 (0) | 0 (0) | 0.4 (1.0) | 0.6 (1.51) |
| Average precipitation days (≥ 0.01 inch) | 16 | 12.4 | 14.5 | 12.6 | 11.6 | 9.7 | 5.8 | 5.3 | 7.5 | 12 | 17 | 16.1 | 140.5 |
Source 1: NOAA
Source 2: NCDC

== Demographics ==
Historical population
| Census | Pop. | Note | %± |
|---|---|---|---|
| 1880 | 917 | | — |
| 1890 | 4,558 | | 397.1% |
| 1900 | 3,443 | | −24.5% |
| 1910 | 4,181 | | 21.4% |
| 1920 | 2,847 | | −31.9% |
| 1930 | 3,979 | | 39.8% |
| 1940 | 4,683 | | 17.7% |
| 1950 | 6,888 | | 47.1% |
| 1960 | 5,074 | | −26.3% |
| 1970 | 5,241 | | 3.3% |
| 1980 | 6,067 | | 15.8% |
| 1990 | 7,001 | | 15.4% |
| 2000 | 8,334 | | 19.0% |
| 2010 | 9,113 | | 9.3% |
| 2020 | 10,148 | | 11.4% |
| 2025 (est.) | 10,678 | | 5.2% |
U.S. Decennial Census

=== 2020 census ===
As of the 2020 census, Port Townsend had a population of 10,148. The population density was 1,461.8 people per square mile (460.3/km^{2}). The median age was 60.3 years, 1.6% of residents were under the age of 5, 12.0% were under the age of 18, and 40.7% were 65 years of age or older; for every 100 females there were 85.0 males, and for every 100 females age 18 and over there were 82.3 males age 18 and over.

There were 5,122 households in Port Townsend, of which 15.8% had children under the age of 18 living in them. Of all households, 40.3% were married-couple households, 18.9% were households with a male householder and no spouse or partner present, and 33.9% were households with a female householder and no spouse or partner present. About 40.2% of all households were made up of individuals and 24.1% had someone living alone who was 65 years of age or older.

There were 5,692 housing units, of which 10.0% were vacant. The homeowner vacancy rate was 0.6% and the rental vacancy rate was 5.0%.

98.4% of residents lived in urban areas, while 1.6% lived in rural areas.

Racial composition as of the 2020 census
| Race | Number | Percent |
|---|---|---|
| White | 8,809 | 86.8% |
| Black or African American | 61 | 0.6% |
| American Indian and Alaska Native | 82 | 0.8% |
| Asian | 192 | 1.9% |
| Native Hawaiian and Other Pacific Islander | 13 | 0.1% |
| Some other race | 172 | 1.7% |
| Two or more races | 819 | 8.1% |
| Hispanic or Latino (of any race) | 426 | 4.2% |

=== 2010 census ===
As of the 2010 census, there were 9,113 people, 4,544 households, and 2,322 families residing in the city. The population density was 1,305.6 inhabitants per square mile (504.1/km^{2}). There were 5,193 housing units at an average density of 744.0 per square mile (287.3/km^{2}). The racial makeup of the city was 92.4% White, 0.5% African American, 1.1% Native American, 1.7% Asian, 0.3% Pacific Islander, 0.8% from other races, and 3.1% from two or more races. Hispanic or Latino people of any race were 3.3% of the population.

There were 4,544 households, of which 19.2% had children under the age of 18 living with them, 38.9% were married couples living together, 9.4% had a female householder with no husband present, 2.8% had a male householder with no wife present, and 48.9% were non-families. 39.6% of all households were made up of individuals, and 18% had someone living alone who was 65 years of age or older. The average household size was 1.98 and the average family size was 2.60.

The median age in the city was 53 years. 16.1% of residents were under the age of 18; 5.3% were between the ages of 18 and 24; 17.4% were from 25 to 44; 36.7% were from 45 to 64; and 24.5% were 65 years of age or older. The gender makeup of the city was 46.0% male and 54.0% female.

== Economy ==
The largest private employer is the Port Townsend Paper Mill. The largest employer overall (private and public) is Jefferson Healthcare, which operates Jefferson Healthcare Hospital. Major industries include maritime trades, manufacturing, tourism, and timber.

== Arts and culture ==
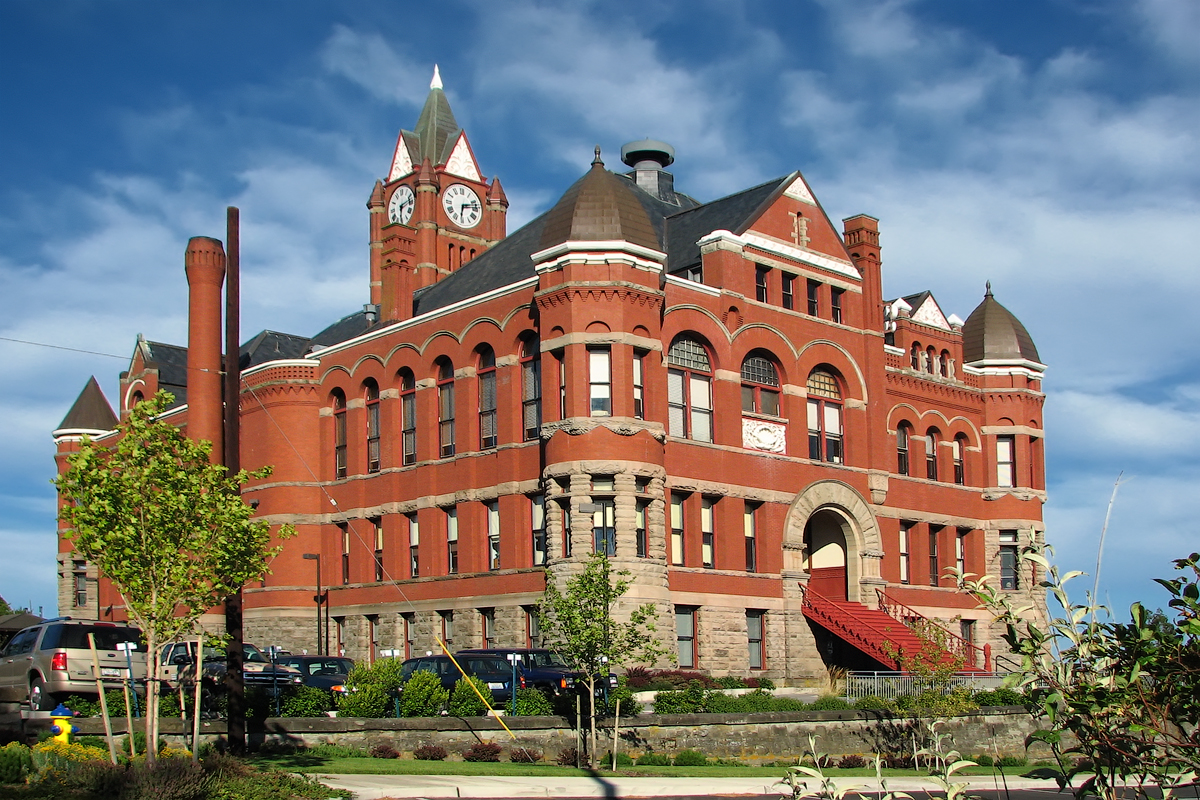
Jefferson County Courthouse in Port Townsend

The sign entering town names Port Townsend a "Victorian Seaport and Arts Community".

=== Art and music ===
Reflecting the numerous artists in the area, downtown has many galleries and two artists' collectives. The nonprofit Northwind Art is located in the 1885 Waterman & Katz Building downtown. There is a monthly Art Walk, and a plethora of classes, workshops, and training are available locally.

Fort Worden State Park is home to a number of cultural organizations and venues. Centrum is a culture and arts organization that hosts a multitude of concerts, festivals, and workshops. These include "Fiddle Tunes", blues, jazz, voice, chamber music, and more. Copper Canyon Press, the poetry press, is located there, as are facilities for Goddard College, Madrona Mindbody Institute, Peninsula College, and the Port Townsend School of Woodworking. In late October and November 1981, Fort Worden was the central filming location for the 1982 movie An Officer And A Gentleman starring Richard Gere.

Port Townsend has two dance schools for children and adults. The city is also home to Port Townsend Symphony Orchestra.

=== Festivals and events ===
Port Townsend is host to several annual events such as the Port Townsend Wooden Boat festival, Kinetic Skulpture Race [sic] (since 1983), the Rhododendron Festival, Port Townsend Film Festival, and the annual blues and jazz festival.

Since 1999, Port Townsend has held its annual international film festival in September. The Rose Theatre downtown shows contemporary American and foreign films. The Uptown Theater shows family-oriented films, and a nearby drive-in theater is open during the summer. Key City Public Theatre is the local playhouse presenting many award-winning productions and Shakespeare in the Park in the summer.

Starting in August 2019, Fort Worden began hosting a music festival called "THING", created by Adam Zacks, the founder of the Sasquatch! Music Festival. In 2023, Fleet Foxes, an indie-folk group from Seattle, led by Port Townsend's notable musician Robin Pecknold, was the listed headliner. Due to difficult accessibility to the event because of Port Townsend's location, coupled with limited lodging options and low revenue, the THING festival would not return to the city in 2024.

=== Historical buildings and sites ===
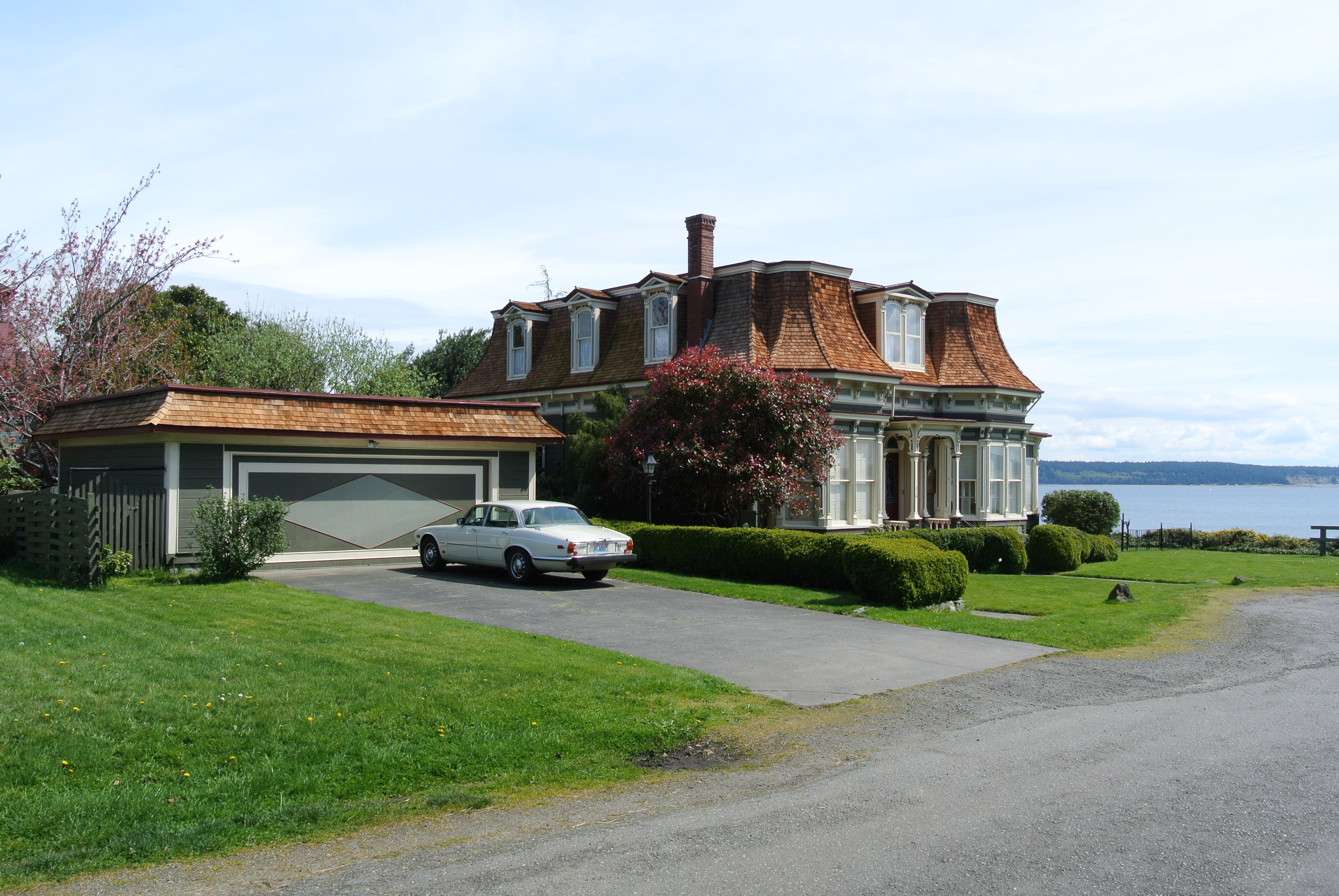
Bartlett House, built in 1883

Port Townsend is noted for its Victorian houses and significant historical buildings. The city has more than a dozen large, well-preserved buildings, including the Port Townsend Public Library (a 1913 Carnegie Library), the Federal Building (now commonly known as the city's post office), the Rose Theatre, and the Elks Lodge, which now houses Silverwater Cafe. Fort Worden, now a state park, has retained some of its pre-World War I architecture built when it was a military facility. Buildings have been adapted for other uses, including the publicly available Olympic Youth Hostel, which closed in 2011. The Jefferson County Courthouse is in a Romanesque architectural style, as popularized by Henry Hobson Richardson, with a 125-foot bell tower.

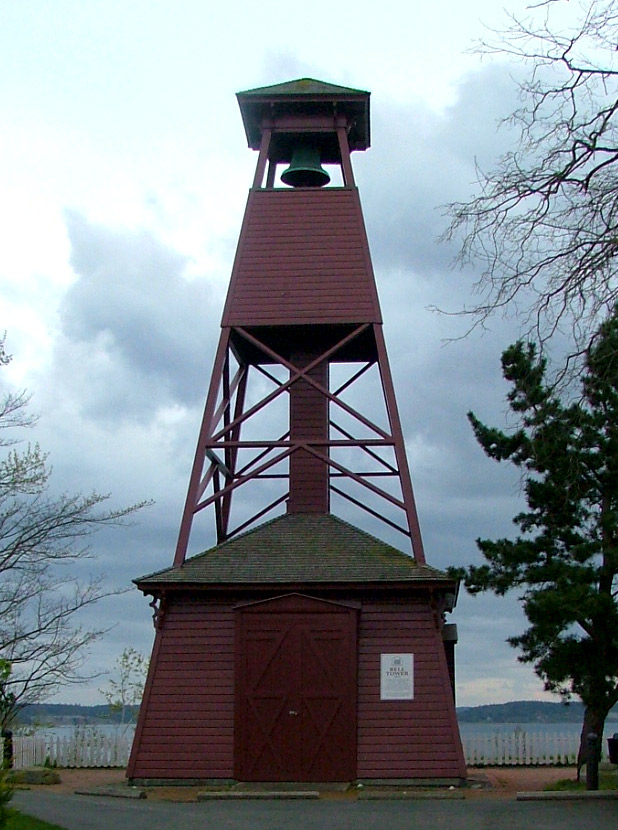
Bell Tower

In 1976, the Downtown waterfront and parts of Uptown were designated a Registered Historic District. Later, Fort Worden (now part of Fort Worden State Park) and the City of Port Townsend were designated National Historic Landmarks.

The Bell Tower on the bluff above downtown is one of two known towers of this type in the United States. It was used from 1890 to the 1940s to call volunteer firefighters. It was restored in 2003 by the Jefferson County Historical Society. The second bell tower is located in Helena, Montana, and was also used for fire alarms during the late 19th century.

=== Tourism ===
A history museum is located downtown and the Port Townsend Aero Museum is located at the local airport. The Northwest Maritime Center is located on the waterfront, and features a wooden boat shop. The Port Townsend Marine Science Center has facilities at Fort Worden State Park.

== Education ==
The city is served by the Port Townsend School District, which manages public K–12 education for pupils in Port Townsend, the Quimper Peninsula, and the area around Discovery Bay. The school district had an enrollment of 1,173 students in the 2022–23 school year and approximately 153 staff members. It has a single high school, Port Townsend High School, one middle school, and one elementary school. The elementary school, named Salish Coast, opened in 2018 to replace the demolished Grant Street Elementary School. The Port Townsend School District is a participant in the U.S. Department of Agriculture's Farm to School program and maintains a 12,000-square-foot (1,100 m^{2}) farm plot that is used to provide produce for school cafeteria meals.

Port Townsend is also home to the Swan School, a private school for pupils up to 6th grade. Another private school, the non-profit Jefferson Community School, was founded in 2005 to provide "experiential education" for students. It later transitioned into an online school with international students until it closed in 2020.

Peninsula College, a community college based in Port Angeles, opened its first Port Townsend campus in 2004. It moved to Fort Worden in September 2016 following $6 million in renovations to an existing building. Fort Worden was also home to a branch of Goddard College, a private online college that established its Port Townsend campus in 2005. The college closed all of its campuses in 2024. Other adult educational organizations in the city include Centrum, Northwind Art, and the Port Townsend School of Woodworking.

== Media ==
The city is home to the Port Townsend Leader, a weekly newspaper that has been published in Port Townsend since 1889. It was preceded by other newspapers, including the Port Townsend Register in 1859. The Peninsula Daily News, a daily newspaper based in Port Angeles, also covers the area. The libertarian magazine Liberty was founded in Port Townsend.

Port Townsend is within the broadcast range of radio stations in Victoria, British Columbia, and has its own local stations. KPTZ was founded in 2011 as a nonprofit community station and is based in the city. A second local station, KROH, was founded the same year to broadcast Christian programming.

The city has been used as a location for several film and television productions. An Officer and a Gentleman, released in 1982, was partially shot at Fort Worden and other locations around the city. It was followed by Snow Falling on Cedars (1999), Enough (2002), and The Ring (2002).

== Infrastructure ==
=== Transportation ===
Port Townsend lies along State Route 20, a major highway that connects the Olympic Peninsula to the northern regions of the state. The highway terminates at 13 miles (21 km) to the southwest at a junction with U.S. Route 101 (US 101) in Discovery Bay. US 101 continues west towards Port Angeles and south to Olympia. From the city, State Route 20 crosses the Admiralty Inlet to Whidbey Island via the Port Townsend–Coupeville ferry, part of the Washington State Ferries system. The ferry carries walk-on passengers and vehicular traffic, the latter of which requires an advance reservation for most of its capacity. The route is also prone to cancellations during stormy weather and high winds.

The city is also served by Jefferson Transit, a local public transit system that operates buses within Port Townsend and to adjacent areas. Its routes include service to Sequim, Brinnon, Kingston, and Poulsbo with onward connections to other transit systems. Jefferson Transit was established by a voter-approved ballot measure in 1980 and is funded by a sales tax within the county. It replaced an earlier private bus system in Port Townsend that traced its origin to early jitney services in the 1910s. Jefferson Transit became fare-free in 2020.

== Notable people ==
- Tom Baker, baseball player
- Wayne Bastrup, actor and musician
- William A. Bugge, civil engineer and highway commissioner
- Daniel James Brown, author
- Luke Burbank, radio host
- John Edward Douglas, author
- Nick Harper, politician and state representative
- John Louis Hayden, U.S. Army officer
- Frank Herbert, author of Dune
- Katie Herzog, journalist
- Anne Hirondelle, ceramic artist
- Alan James, film director and screenwriter
- Parker Lundgren, guitarist
- Howard S. McGee, U.S. Army general
- Art McLarney, baseball player
- Thomas T. Minor, politician and railroad builder
- Sue Morgan, rower and Olympian
- Jack Nagel, alpine ski racer and Olympian
- Miles Okazaki, jazz guitarist and composer
- Robin Pecknold, musician
- Francis Pettygrove, pioneer and merchant
- Annie Proulx, writer
- Marvin Glenn Shields, U.S. Navy sailor and Medal of Honor recipient
- Thaddeus S. Smith, U.S. Army soldier and Medal of Honor recipient
- Artis the Spoonman, street performer
- John Stroeder, basketball player
- John Weir Troy, politician
- Jim Whittaker, mountaineer and first American to summit Mount Everest
- Kimba Wood, U.S. federal judge
- Elizabeth Anne Scarborough, author

== Sister cities ==
Port Townsend is twinned with Ichikawa, Hyōgo, Japan. A group of local students participate in an exchange with this city during the summer.

According to the Washington State Lieutenant Governor's website, Port Townsend also has a sister city relationship with Jalapa, Nicaragua, though the city's website does not reflect this.

== See also ==
- Pacific Wharf Company
