= Howard S. McGee =

United States Army general

Howard Samuel McGee
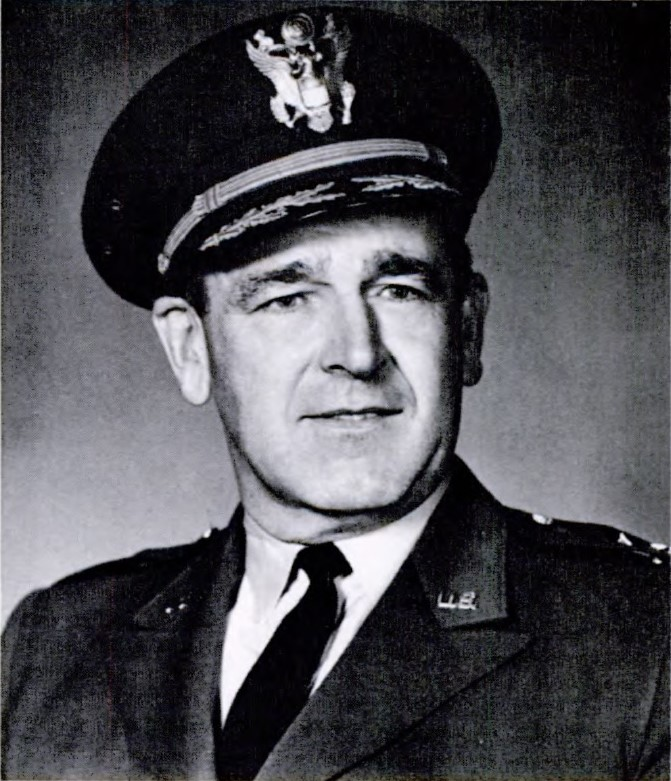
- Born: Howard Samuel McGee; October 4, 1915; Port Townsend, Washington
- Died: January 18, 2005 (aged 89); Seattle, Washington
- Burial place: Tahoma National Cemetery
- Military career
- Allegiance: United States
- Branch: United States Army
- Service years: 1940–1978
- Rank: Major General
- Commands: Adjutant General, Washington State National Guard 1965–1978

Major General Howard Samuel McGee (October 4, 1915 in Port Townsend, Washington – January 18, 2005 in Seattle, Washington), was a US Army general. He attended the University of Washington from 1935 to 1940, earning a B.S. degree. While at the university McGee was enrolled in the ROTC program and subsequently commissioned as second lieutenant, Coast Artillery Corps, Officers Reserve Corps on 15 March 1940.

In May 1941 McGee entered active Federal service with the 19th Coast Artillery Regiment as a battery officer and later served as battery commander. McGee was promoted to first lieutenant in February 1942 and to captain in November 1942. McGee was reassigned in May 1943 to the 3rd Battalion, 215th CA Regiment stationed at Fort Greely, Alaska and served as S-3 and battalion executive officer. In 1944 McGee became executive officer of the 347th Anti-Aircraft Artillery Battalion stationed at Fort Belvoir, Virginia. Later McGee served as company commander and battalion executive officer of the 1286th Combat Engineer Battalion at Camp Rucker, Alabama. In the latter part of 1944 McGee transferred overseas with his unit and served in England and Germany. McGee was promoted to major in December 1945 and released from active duty in February 1946.

Reappointed major, Corps of Engineers, ORC, in September 1946, McGee assumed command of the 399th Combat Engineer Battalion. In October 1947 McGee was appointed major, CAC, in the Washington National Guard and was assigned as S-3 of the 205th AAA Group. McGee was subsequently reassigned as battalion commander, 240th AAA Battalion in October 1949 and promoted to lieutenant colonel in May 1950.

In April 1954 McGee transferred to the 205th AAA Group as group commander and was promoted to colonel in November 1954. Upon reorganization of the Washington National Guard in April 1959, McGee was assigned as executive officer, 115th Artillery Brigade (Air Defense). In June 1961 McGee was transferred to the 41st Infantry Division and assigned as division artillery commander. On 14 November 1961, McGee was promoted to brigadier general of the line.

Upon conversion of the 41st Infantry Division to the ROAD concept in March 1963, McGee was assigned as assistant division commander. General McGee served in that assignment until 16 June 1965, when he was detailed as the Adjutant General, State of Washington, and was appointed major general on 1 July 1965 by Governor Dan Evans at a time when the country was engulfed in protests against the Vietnam War, continued unrest over civil rights and rumblings from a fledgling environmental movement. McGee held the post Washington State Adjutant General until his retirement in February 1978. In the article "Former Washington National Guard leader McGee dies at 89" in the January 29, 2005 issue of the Seattle Times, Governor Evans recalled "Maj. Gen. McGee was a forceful leader and a voice of reason during a troubled time and often said, " 'We shouldn't be putting 19-year-old soldiers with rifles up against 19-year-old college students,'."

In his later years, McGee suffered from prostate cancer and cardiovascular disease. He died January 18, 2005, at his home in Seattle of renal failure. McGee was interred at Tahoma National Cemetery.

== Military education ==
- ROTC, University of Washington, 1940
- AAA Cadre School, Camp Davis, North Carolina, 1943
- Engineer Training Course (AGF), Fort Belvoir, Virginia, 1944
- Special Weapons and Guided Missile Course, Fort Bliss, Texas, 1955
- Associate Course, Command & General Staff College, Fort Leavenworth, Kansas, 1956
- Special Information Course for Reserve Component Officers, USASGSC, Fort Leavenworth, Kansas, 1959
- Senior Officers Preventive Maintenance Course, Fort Knox, Kentucky, 1960
- Asilomar National Strategy Seminar, Pacific Grove, California, 1960
- CBR Weapons Orientation Course, Dugway Proving Grounds, Dugway, Utah, 1961
- USASGS Officer Refresher Course, Fort Leavenworth, Kansas, 1961
- Division Artillery Staff Officer Refresher Course, Fort Sill, Oklahoma, 1962 and 1963
- C&GS Officer Refresher Course, Fort Leavenworth, Kansas, 1963
- Infantry Field Grade Officer Refresher Course, Fort Benning, Georgia, 1963
- C&GS Officer Refresher Course (Combat Division), Fort Leavenworth, Kansas, 1964 and 1965.

== Decorations and awards ==
- American Defense Service Medal
- American Campaign Medal
- Asiatic-Pacific Campaign Medal
- European-African-Middle Eastern Campaign Medal
- World War Two Victory Medal
- Armed Forces Reserve Medal with 10-year device

== Sources ==
- WASH ARNG PAM 870–1–7, WASH ANG PAM 210–1–7, Washington National Guard Pamphlet: The Official History of the Washington National Guard, Volume 7: Washington National Guard in Post World War II<http://museum.washingtonguard.org/documents/FIELDS_VOL_VII.pdf>
