= Obesity medicine =

Field of medicine

Obesity medicine is a field of medicine dedicated to the comprehensive treatment of patients with obesity. Obesity medicine takes into account the multi-factorial etiology of obesity in which behavior, development, environment, epigenetic, genetic, nutrition, physiology, and psychosocial contributors all play a role. As time progresses, we become more knowledgeable about the complexity of obesity, and we have ascertained that there is a certain skill set and knowledge base that is required to treat this patient population. Clinicians in the field should understand how a myriad of factors contribute to obesity including: gut microbiota diversity, regulation of food intake and energy balance through enteroendocrine and neuroregulation, and adipokine physiology. Obesity medicine physicians should be skilled in identifying factors which have contributed to obesity and know how to employ methods (behavior modification, pharmacotherapy, and surgery) to treat obesity. No two people with obesity are alike, and it is important to approach each patient as an individual to determine which factors contributed to their obesity in order to effectively treat each patient. Physicians specializing in obesity medicine may choose to obtain board certification by the American Board of Obesity Medicine.

== Criticisms of the field ==
Some physicians do not feel as though obesity medicine should be its own sub-specialty. Rather, they feel as though obesity, as a complex disease process, should be treated by endocrinologists or physicians who have acquired additional training in the field of nutrition.

== Obesity as a chronic disease ==
In June 2013, the American Medical Association (AMA) adopted policy that recognizes obesity as a chronic disease, a disease process which requires a range of medical interventions to prevent and treat. While professionals from different professions (US senators, congressmen and congresswomen, physicians, and medical students) applauded this decision, others were not so eager to categorize obesity as a disease. Since the initial acknowledgement of obesity as a disease by the AMA, there has been an ongoing debate about the topic.

== Education ==
=== Obesity education in medical schools and residency ===
Only a few medical schools and residency programs offer training and education in the field of obesity. As a result, some physicians may not be equipped to treat it. In order to address this issue, medical schools and residency programs will need to modify their curriculum to teach their students and residents about this disease process to ensure that the large subset of the patients that they encounter in their careers receive adequate treatment.

=== Obesity medicine clinical fellowships ===
There are only a few dedicated programs which train clinicians in the field of obesity medicine:

1. Harvard Medical School Obesity Medicine and Nutrition Fellowship
2. Nemours Pediatric Obesity Fellowship
3. UTHealth Center for Obesity Medicine and Metabolic Performance.

=== Obesity research fellowships ===
There are several research programs in the field of obesity:

1. University of Alabama-Birmingham
2. Johns Hopkins Obesity Research in General Internal Medicine Fellowship
3. Minnesota Obesity Prevention Training (MnOPT)
4. Yale Program for Obesity, Weight and Eating Research (POWER)
5. Centers for Disease Control & Prevention Nutrition and Obesity Fellowship
6. University of Arizona, Nutritional Sciences Graduate Program, Training Grant in Obesity Research
7. Harvard Training Program in Nutrition and Metabolism.

=== Obesity board certification ===
Board certification in obesity medicine is offered by the American Board of Obesity Medicine. Eligibility requires either the completion of a fellowship, or adequate continuing medical education.
