= Jefferson Healthcare Hospital =

Geography
- Location: 834 Sheridan Street, Port Townsend, Washington, United States
- Coordinates: 48.106°N 122.789°W

Organization
- Type: Community

Services
- Emergency department: Level IV trauma center
- Beds: 25

History
- Founded: 1890

Links
- Website: jeffersonhealthcare.org/location/medical-center/
- Lists: Hospitals in Washington state

Jefferson Healthcare Hospital is a 25-bed Critical Access Hospital located in Port Townsend, Washington. Established in 1890 by the Sisters of Providence as St. John Hospital, it is presently independently owned and operated by Jefferson County Public Hospital District No. 2, doing business as Jefferson Healthcare.

== History ==
The main hospital was founded in 1890 as St. John Hospital by the Sisters of Providence. In 1975, ownership of the hospital transferred to Jefferson County Public Hospital District No. 2, which had been formed following a special election on August 15, 1961 authorizing establishment of the District. The facility was renamed Jefferson General Hospital in 1975. In 2004, the name was again updated to Jefferson Healthcare Hospital, to better reflect its status as the nucleus of an integrated healthcare system that had grown to include several hospital-based and community clinics.

== Services ==
The hospital operates a level IV trauma center and is the sole hospital in Jefferson County. It is designated as a critical access hospital.
