= Jefferson Healthcare =

Jefferson Healthcare is a health system consisting of Jefferson Healthcare Hospital and a number of community clinics in Port Townsend, Washington, USA.

With over 850 employees, Jefferson Healthcare is the largest employer in Jefferson County. The hospital and clinics employ about 120 physicians, nurse practitioners and physician assistants. About half of the revenue comes from Medicare.
